= List of Grewia species =

The large flowering plant genus Grewia /ˈɡruːiə/ is today placed by most authors in the mallow family Malvaceae, in the expanded sense as proposed by in the APG. Formerly, it was placed in either the linden family (Tiliaceae) or the Sparrmanniaceae. However, these were both not monophyletic with respect to other Malvales - as already indicated by the uncertainties surrounding placement of Grewia and similar genera - and have thus been merged into the Malvaceae. Together with the bulk of the former Sparrmanniaceae, Grewia is in the subfamily Grewioideae and therein the tribe Grewieae, of which it is the type genus.

The genus was named by Carl Linnaeus, in honor of the botanist Nehemiah Grew (1641–1712) from England. Grew was one of the leading plant anatomists and microscope researchers of his time, and his study of pollen laid the groundwork for modern-day palynology.

Plants of the World Online accepts 275 species:

== A ==
- Grewia abutilifolia Vent. ex Juss.
- Grewia acuminata Juss.
- Grewia afra Meisn. (syn. Grewia caffra Meisn.)
- Grewia ambongoensis Baill.
- Grewia amicorum Steud.
- Grewia amplifolia Baill.
- Grewia analamerensis Capuron
- Grewia andramparo R.Vig.
- Grewia angolensis Welw. ex Mast.
- Grewia angustisepala Hung T.Chang
- Grewia annamica Gagnep.
- Grewia antsiranensis Capuron
- Grewia apetala Juss.
- Grewia arborea (Forssk.) Lam.
- Grewia argentea Exell & Mendonça
- Grewia asiatica L.
- Grewia astropetala Pierre
- Grewia atrobrunnea Burret
- Grewia australis Burret
- Grewia avellana Hiern

== B ==
- Grewia baillonii R.Vig.
- Grewia bakeriana Baill.
- Grewia balensis Kirkup & Sebsebe
- Grewia baronii R.Vig.
- Grewia barteri Burret
- Grewia bicolor Juss.
- Grewia bilamellata Gagnep.
- Grewia biloba G.Don
- Grewia bilocularis Balf.f.
- Grewia boehmiana F.Hoffm.
- Grewia boivinii Baill.
- Grewia bojeri Mabb.
- Grewia botryantha Baill.
- Grewia brachypoda C.Y.Wu
- Grewia bracteata Roth
- Grewia brassii Burret
- Grewia breviflora Benth.
- Grewia brideliifolia Baill.
- Grewia brunnea K.Schum.
- Grewia bulot Gagnep.
- Grewia burttii Exell

== C ==
- Grewia calvata Baker
- Grewia capitellata Bojer
- Grewia capuronii Mabb.
- Grewia carpinifolia Juss.
- Grewia carrissoi Exell & Mendonça
- Grewia celtidifolia Juss.
- Grewia cerocarpa Exell & Mendonça
- Grewia chalybaea Baill.
- Grewia chuniana Burret
- Grewia cissoides Hutch. & Dalziel
- Grewia cloiselii R.Vig.
- Grewia comorensis Bojer
- Grewia concolor Merr.
- Grewia conferta Warb. ex Burret
- Grewia cuneifolia Juss.
- Grewia cuspidatoserrata Burret
- Grewia cyclea Baill.
- Grewia cyclopetala Wawra & Peyr.
- Grewia cylindrica (Pierre) Burret

== D ==
- Grewia decemovulata Merxm.
- Grewia densa K.Schum.
- Grewia diversipes Capuron
- Grewia douliotii R.Vig.

== E ==
- Grewia eberhardtii Lecomte
- Grewia elyseoi Cavaco & Simoes
- Grewia emarginata Wight & Arn.
- Grewia eriocarpa Juss.
- Grewia erythraea Schweinf.
- Grewia erythroxyloides Capuron

== F ==
- Grewia falcata C.Y.Wu
- Grewia falcistipula K.Schum.
- Grewia ferruginea Hochst. ex A.Rich.
- Grewia filipes Burret
- Grewia flava DC.
- Grewia flavescens Juss.
- Grewia flavicans Boivin ex Baill.
- Grewia forbesii Harv. ex Mast.

== G ==
- Grewia gamblei J.R.Drumm.
- Grewia gautieri Wahlert & Nusb.
- Grewia geayi R.Vig.
- Grewia gillettii Sebsebe & B.Mathew
- Grewia glandulosa Vahl
- Grewia glyphaeoides Baill.
- Grewia goetzeana K.Schum.
- Grewia gracillima Wild
- Grewia grandidieri Baill.
- Grewia grandiflora Baker
- Grewia graniticola Halford
- Grewia grevei Baill.
- Grewia guazumifolia Juss.

== H ==
- Grewia helicterifolia Wall. ex G.Don
- Grewia henryi Burret
- Grewia herbacea Hiern
- Grewia hexamita Burret
- Grewia hierniana Exell & Mendonça
- Grewia hildebrandtii Baill.
- Grewia hirsuta Vahl
- Grewia hispida Harv.
- Grewia hispidissima Wahlert, Phillipson & Mabb.
- Grewia holstii Burret
- Grewia holtzii Burret
- Grewia hornbyi Wild
- Grewia huluperakensis I.M.Turner
- Grewia humbertii Capuron
- Grewia humblotii Baill.
- Grewia humilis Wall. ex G.Don
- Grewia hypotephra Pierre

== I – K ==
- Grewia inaequilatera Garcke
- Grewia indandamanica J.L.Ellis & L.N.Ray
- Grewia insularis Ridl.
- Grewia isochroa Burret
- Grewia kakothamnos K.Schum.
- Grewia kjellbergii Burret
- Grewia kothayarensis Murugan & Manickam
- Grewia kwangtungensis Hung T.Chang

== L ==
- Grewia lacei J.R.Drumm. & Craib
- Grewia laevigata Vahl
- Grewia lakshminarasimhanii Arum., Murugan, Arisdason & R.Manik.
- Grewia lanceifolia Roxb.
- Grewia langsonensis Gagnep.
- Grewia lapiazicola Capuron
- Grewia lasiocarpa E.Mey. ex Harv.
- Grewia lasioclada Welw. ex Hiern
- Grewia lasiodiscus K.Schum.
- Grewia latifolia F.Muell. ex Benth.
- Grewia latiglandulosa Z.Y.Huang & S.Y.Liu
- Grewia lavanalensis Baill.
- Grewia lepidopetala Garcke
- Grewia leptopus Ulbr.
- Grewia leucophylla Capuron
- Grewia lilacina K.Schum.
- Grewia limae Wild
- Grewia lutea Exell
- Grewia luteiflora Capuron

== M ==
- Grewia mabberleyana Phillipson, Wahlert & Lowry
- Grewia macropetala Burret
- Grewia macrophylla G.Don
- Grewia madagascariensis Capuron
- Grewia manomboensis G.E.Schatz, Randrian. & Lowry
- Grewia maroana Aug.DC.
- Grewia megalocarpa Juss.
- Grewia meizophylla Burret
- Grewia meridionalis Capuron
- Grewia mesomischa Burret
- Grewia micrantha Bojer
- Grewia microcarpa K.Schum.
- Grewia microcyclea (Burret) Capuron & Mabb.
- Grewia microstemma Wall. ex Kurz
- Grewia mollis Juss.
- Grewia monantha Capuron ex Mabb.
- Grewia monticola Sond.
- Grewia morotaiensis Kosterm.
- Grewia multiflora Juss.
- Grewia myriantha Exell & Mendonça

== N – O ==
- Grewia nagensium Prain
- Grewia nematopus K.Schum.
- Grewia newtonii Burret
- Grewia nitida Juss.
- Grewia occidentalis L.
- Grewia ogadenensis Sebsebe
- Grewia oligandra Pierre
- Grewia oncopetala K.Schum.
- Grewia optiva J.R.Drumm. ex Burret
- Grewia orbiculata Rottler
- Grewia orbifolia F.Muell. ex Benth.
- Grewia orientalis L.
- Grewia oxyphylla Burret

== P ==
- Grewia pachycalyx K.Schum.
- Grewia palawanensis Merr.
- Grewia palodensis E.S.S.Kumar, A.E.S.Khan, Binu & S.M.Almeida
- Grewia pamanziana R.Vig.
- Grewia pandaica J.R.Drumm.
- Grewia pannosisepala Chiov.
- Grewia papuana Burret
- Grewia pedunculata K.Schum.
- Grewia peekelii Burret
- Grewia penicillata Chiov.
- Grewia penninervis Boivin ex Baill.
- Grewia permagna C.Y.Wu ex Hung T.Chang
- Grewia perrieri Capuron
- Grewia pervillei Baill.
- Grewia picta Baill.
- Grewia pindanica R.L.Barrett
- Grewia piscatorum Hance
- Grewia plagiophylla K.Schum.
- Grewia polygama Roxb.
- Grewia pondoensis Burret
- Grewia populoides Burret
- Grewia praecox K.Schum.
- Grewia prunifolia A.Gray
- Grewia pubescens P.Beauv.
- Grewia pulverulenta R.Vig.
- Grewia puttkameri Warb.

== R ==
- Grewia rabehevitrae Randrian., Lowry & G.E.Schatz
- Grewia radula Baker
- Grewia renistipulata (Burret) Dorr
- Grewia retinervis Burret
- Grewia retusifolia Kurz
- Grewia rhamnifolia Roth
- Grewia rhombifolia Kaneh. & Sasaki
- Grewia rhomboides Bojer
- Grewia ribesioides Capuron & Mabb.
- Grewia rizalensis Merr.
- Grewia robusta Burch.
- Grewia rogersii Burtt Davy & Greenway
- Grewia rolfei Merr.
- Grewia rothii DC.
- Grewia rubescens Burret
- Grewia rufostellata Randrian., Lowry & G.E.Schatz
- Grewia rugosifolia De Wild.
- Grewia rupestris Schinz

== S ==
- Grewia sahafariensis Capuron & Mabb.
- Grewia saligna Baill.
- Grewia salutaris Span.
- Grewia sambiranensis Capuron
- Grewia sapida Roxb. ex DC.
- Grewia savannicola R.L.Barrett
- Grewia scabrella Benth.
- Grewia schinzii K.Schum.
- Grewia schweinfurthii Burret
- Grewia sclerophylla Roxb. ex G.Don
- Grewia sely R.Vig.
- Grewia serrata Blanco
- Grewia serratula Baill.
- Grewia serrulata DC.
- Grewia sessilifolia Gagnep.
- Grewia setacea Merr.
- Grewia setaceoides Burret
- Grewia similiopsis C.Whitehouse
- Grewia similis K.Schum.
- Grewia speciosa Burret
- Grewia stenophylla Bojer
- Grewia stolzii Ulbr.
- Grewia stuhlmannii K.Schum.
- Grewia suarezensis Capuron
- Grewia subaequalis Baill.
- Grewia subspathulata N.E.Br.
- Grewia suffruticosa K.Schum.
- Grewia sulcata Mast.

== T ==
- Grewia tahitensis Nadeaud
- Grewia tannifera Hochr.
- Grewia tembensis Fresen.
- Grewia tenax (Forssk.) Fiori
- Grewia tephrodermis K.Schum.
- Grewia thailandica Chantar. & Nualngam
- Grewia thikaensis C.Whitehouse
- Grewia thouvenotii Danguy
- Grewia tiliifolia Vahl
- Grewia tomentosa Juss.
- Grewia transzambesica Wild
- Grewia trichocarpa Hochst. ex A.Rich.
- Grewia triflora (Bojer) Walp.
- Grewia trinervata Baker
- Grewia trinervia De Wild.
- Grewia tristis K.Schum.
- Grewia truncata Mast.
- Grewia tsiandrensis Capuron
- Grewia tulearensis Capuron
- Grewia turbinata Balf.f.

== U – V ==
- Grewia umbellifera Bedd.
- Grewia urenifolia (Pierre) Gagnep.
- Grewia velutina (Forssk.) Lam.
- Grewia vernicosa Schinz
- Grewia viguieri Capuron
- Grewia villosa Willd.
- Grewia viridiflora Teijsm. & Binn.
- Grewia vitiensis Turrill
- Grewia voloina Capuron

== W – Z ==
- Grewia welwitschii Burret
- Grewia winitii Craib
- Grewia woodiana K.Schum.
- Grewia xanthopetala F.Muell. ex Benth.
- Grewia yinkiangensis Y.C.Hsu & R.Zhuge
- Grewia zizyphifolia Baill.
