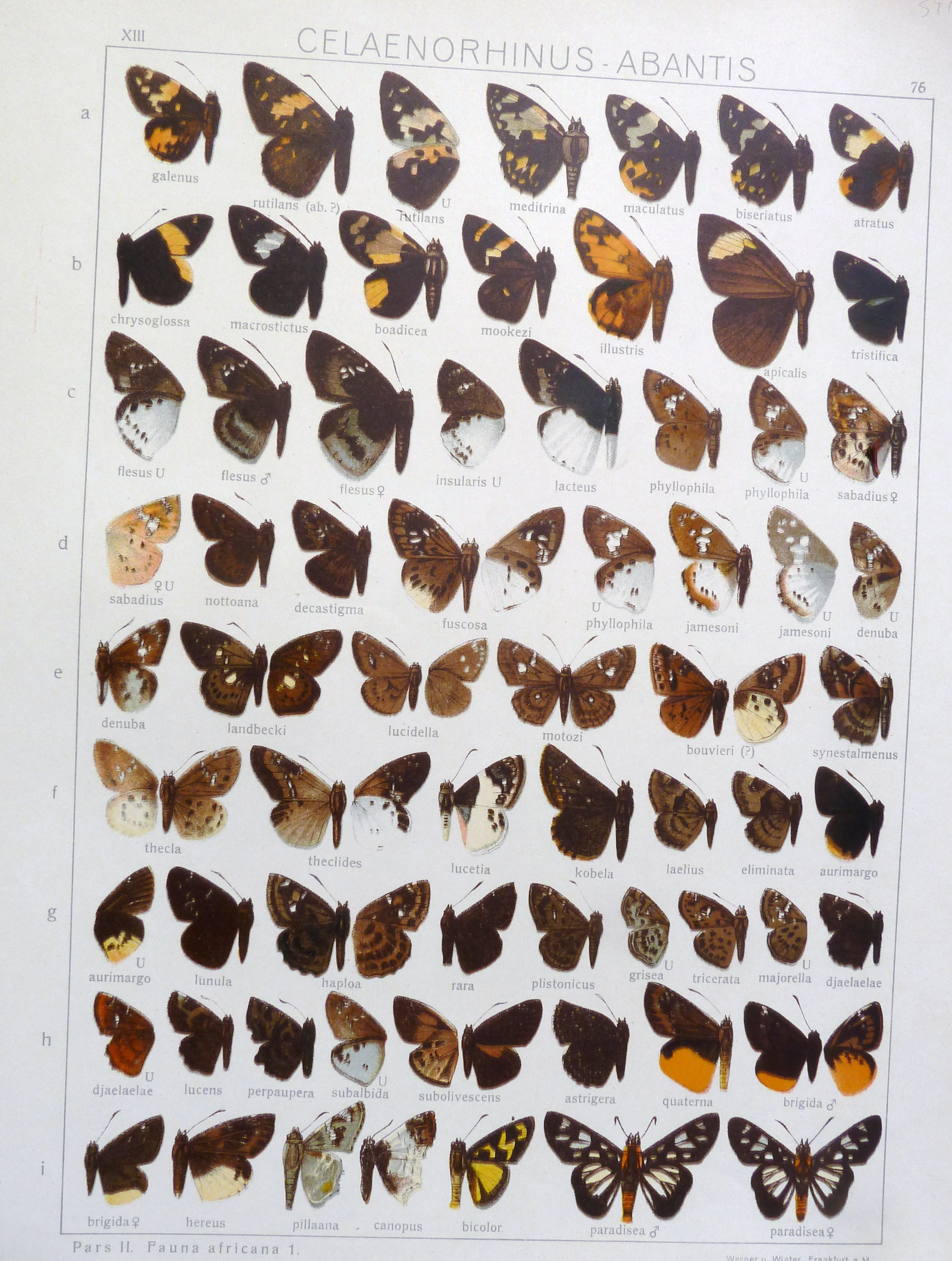

Scientific classification
- Kingdom: Animalia
- Phylum: Arthropoda
- Class: Insecta
- Order: Lepidoptera
- Family: Hesperiidae
- Genus: Netrobalane
- Species: N. canopus

Binomial name
- Netrobalane canopus (Trimen, 1864)

Synonyms
- Caprona canopus Trimen, 1864; Caprona canopus var. orientalis Aurivillius, 1925

= Netrobalane canopus =

Species of butterfly

Netrobalane canopus, the buff-tipped skipper, is a butterfly of the family Hesperiidae. It is found in savannah in Africa, from South Africa to Kenya to Nigeria and southern Sudan.

The wingspan is 26–44 mm for males and 42–45 mm for females. Adults are on wing year-round, with peaks from September to November and from February to May in southern Africa.

The larvae feed on Grewia species (including Grewia occidentalis, Grewia similis and Grewia flavescens), Dombeya species (including Dombeya cymosa and Dombeya calantha), Hibiscus and Pavonia species (including Pavonia macrophylla and Pavonia burchelli).
