= Emu berry =

Emu berry is a common name for several Australian plants and may refer to:

- Grewia latifolia, endemic to Northern and Eastern Australia
- Grewia retusifolia
- Podocarpus drouynianus, native to Western Australia
