= G. salicifolia =

G. salicifolia may refer to:

- Garrya salicifolia, the willowleaf silktassel, a plant species in the genus Garrya found in Baja California, Mexico
- Geijera salicifolia, a plant species found in Australia, New Caledonia and Papua New Guinea
- Grewia salicifolia, a flowering plant species

== See also ==
- Salicifolia (disambiguation)
