= Grewia oxyphylla =

Conservation status
- Least Concern (IUCN 3.1)

Scientific classification
- Kingdom: Plantae
- Clade: Tracheophytes
- Clade: Angiosperms
- Clade: Eudicots
- Clade: Rosids
- Order: Malvales
- Family: Malvaceae
- Genus: Grewia
- Species: G. oxyphylla

Binomial name
- Grewia oxyphylla Burret

Species of flowering plant

Grewia oxyphylla is an Australian species of flowering plant in the mallow family, Malvaceae.
