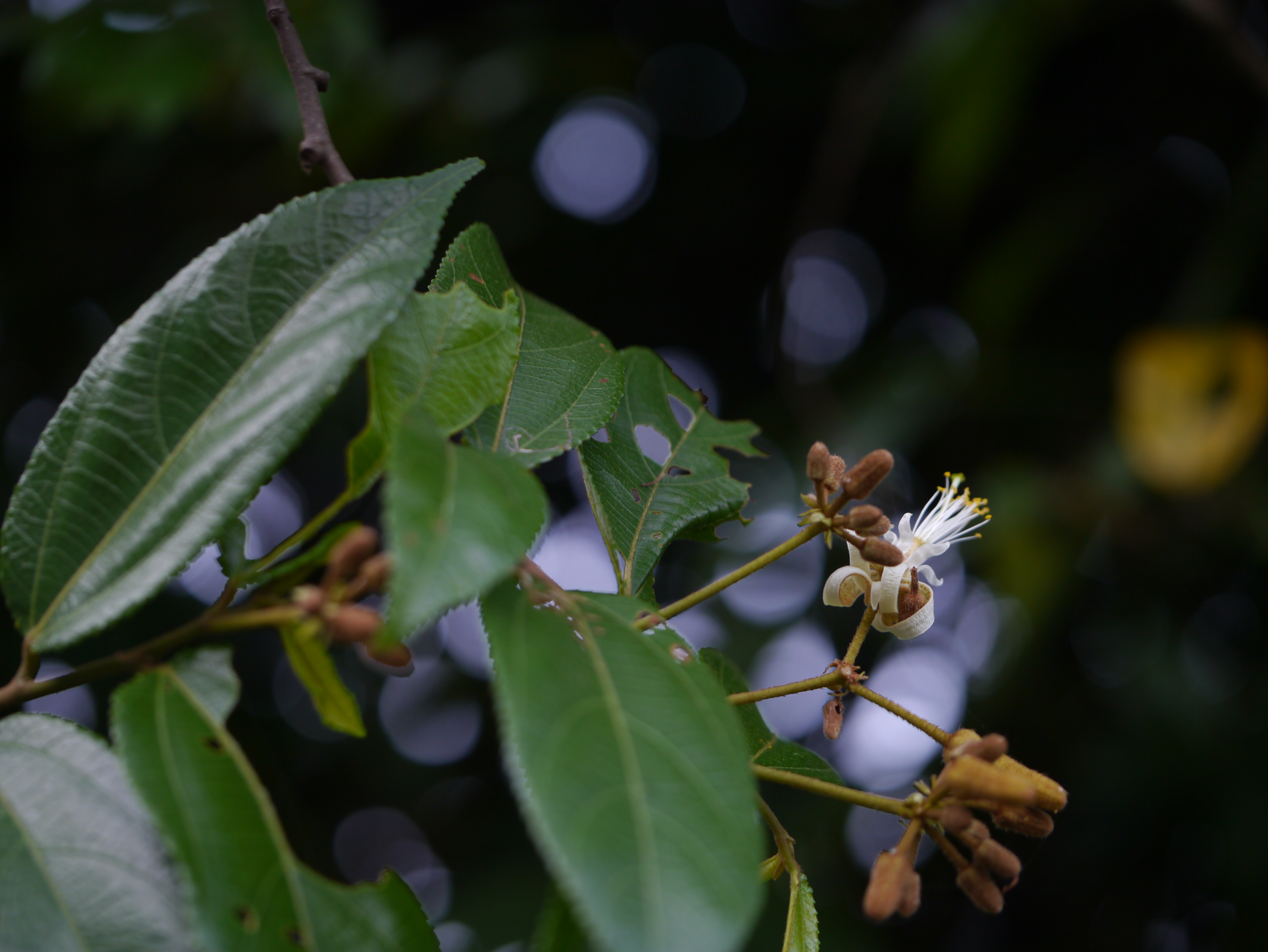

Scientific classification
- Kingdom: Plantae
- Clade: Tracheophytes
- Clade: Angiosperms
- Clade: Eudicots
- Clade: Rosids
- Order: Malvales
- Family: Malvaceae
- Genus: Grewia
- Species: G. umbellifera

Binomial name
- Grewia umbellifera Wight

= Grewia umbellifera =

Species of flowering plant

Grewia umbellifera is a small, scandent shrub of the family Malvaceae which is native to India.
