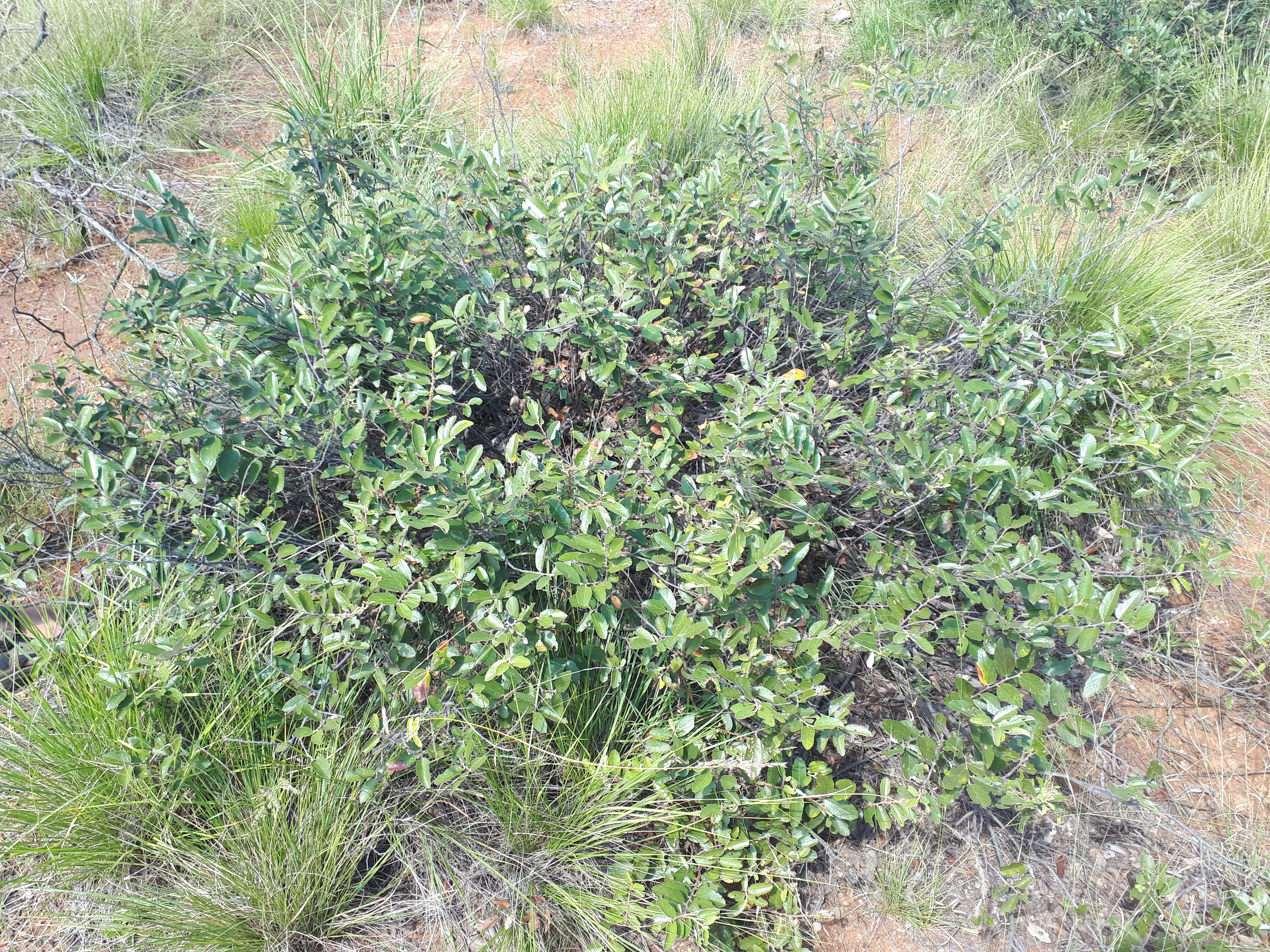

Scientific classification
- Kingdom: Plantae
- Clade: Tracheophytes
- Clade: Angiosperms
- Clade: Eudicots
- Clade: Rosids
- Order: Malvales
- Family: Malvaceae
- Genus: Grewia
- Species: G. rogersii

Binomial name
- Grewia rogersii Burtt Davy & Greenway

= Grewia rogersii =

Waterberg raisin

Species of flowering plant

Grewia rogersii, the waterberg raisin (Afrikaans: Waterberg-rosyntjie) is a species of plant in the family Malvaceae. It is generally considered a rare species as defined by the International Union for the Conservation of Nature and Natural Resources, but it can be abundant locally.

== Description ==
It grows as a spreading bush or small tree that can grow up to 5 m (16 ft) high. The young branchlets are hairy at first, later becoming hairless. The leaves are up to 7 cm (2.8 in) long, rather dark green above and lighter below, with whitish or pale brownish hairs. An important distinguishing feature is the fruit, which can be found between January and April. It is hairy, about 1 cm in diameter and deeply 4-lobed. The flowers are yellow and found between October and December in axillary, 3-flowered groups on stalks up to 1.5 cm long.

== Distribution and habitat ==
Grewia rogersii occurs in Bushveld and is endemic to the Waterberg Biosphere in South Africa where it grows on rocky hillsides.

== Gallery ==
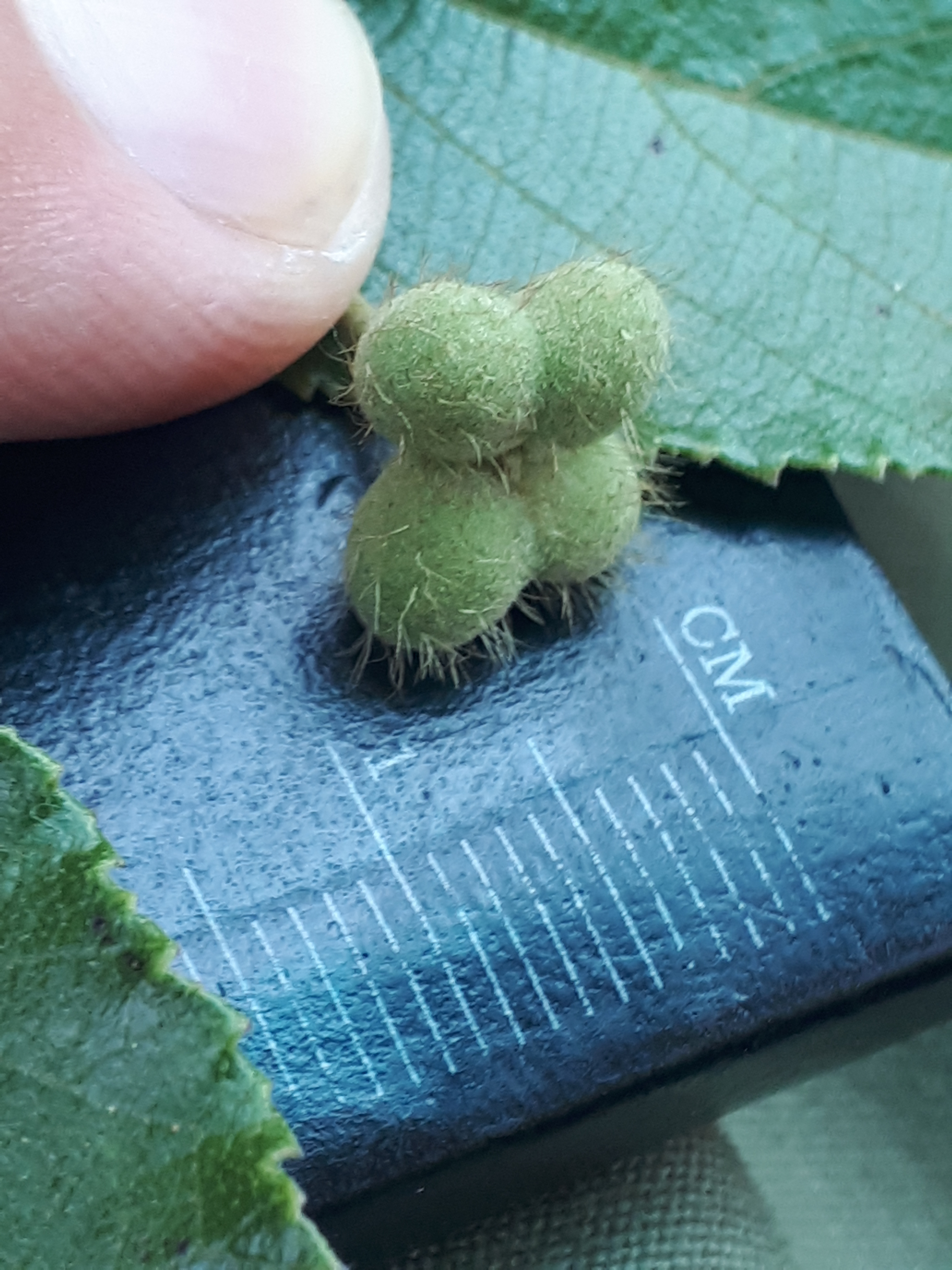
4-lobed fruit of Grewia rogersii

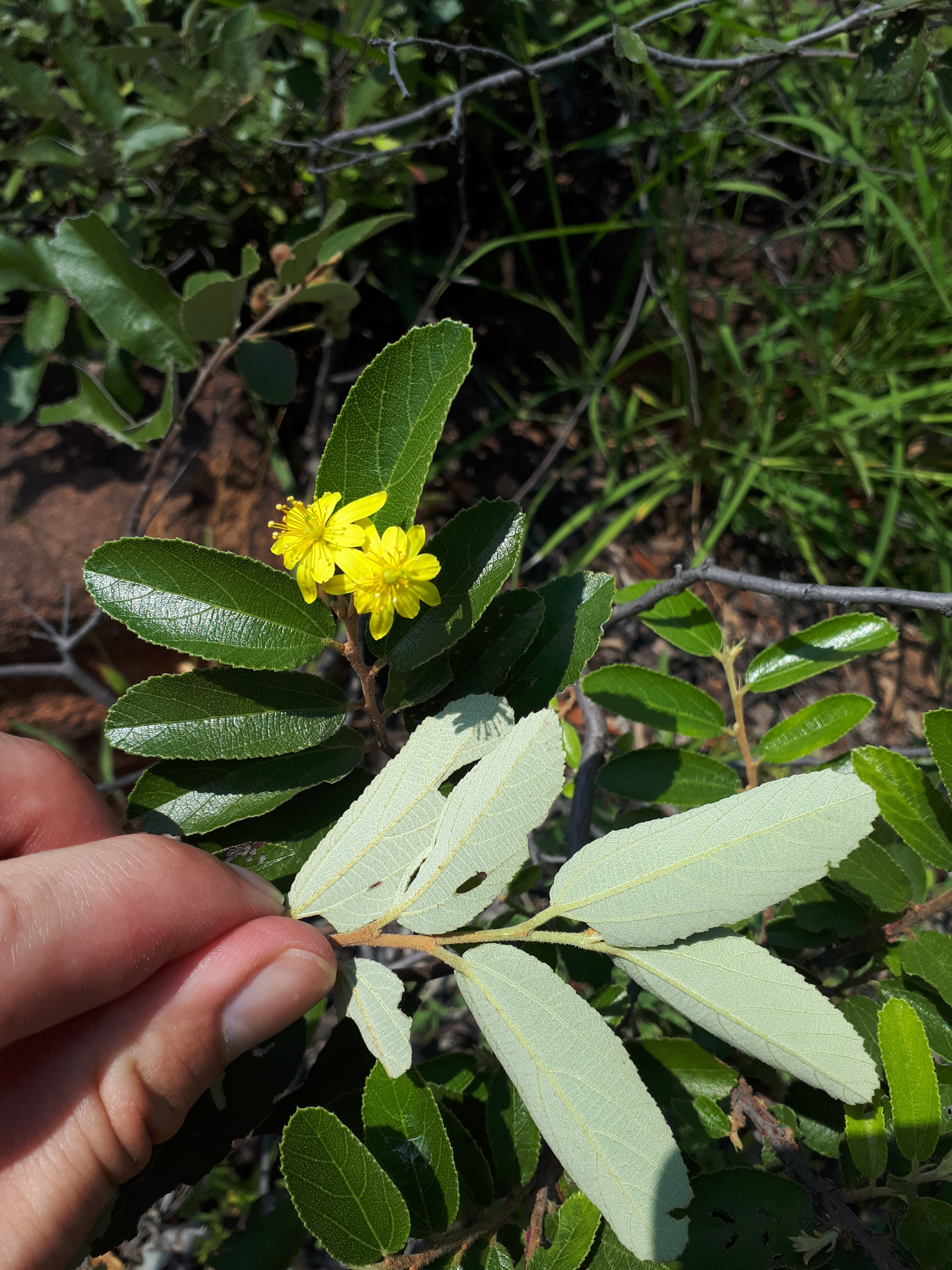
Leaves and flowers of Grewia rogersii
