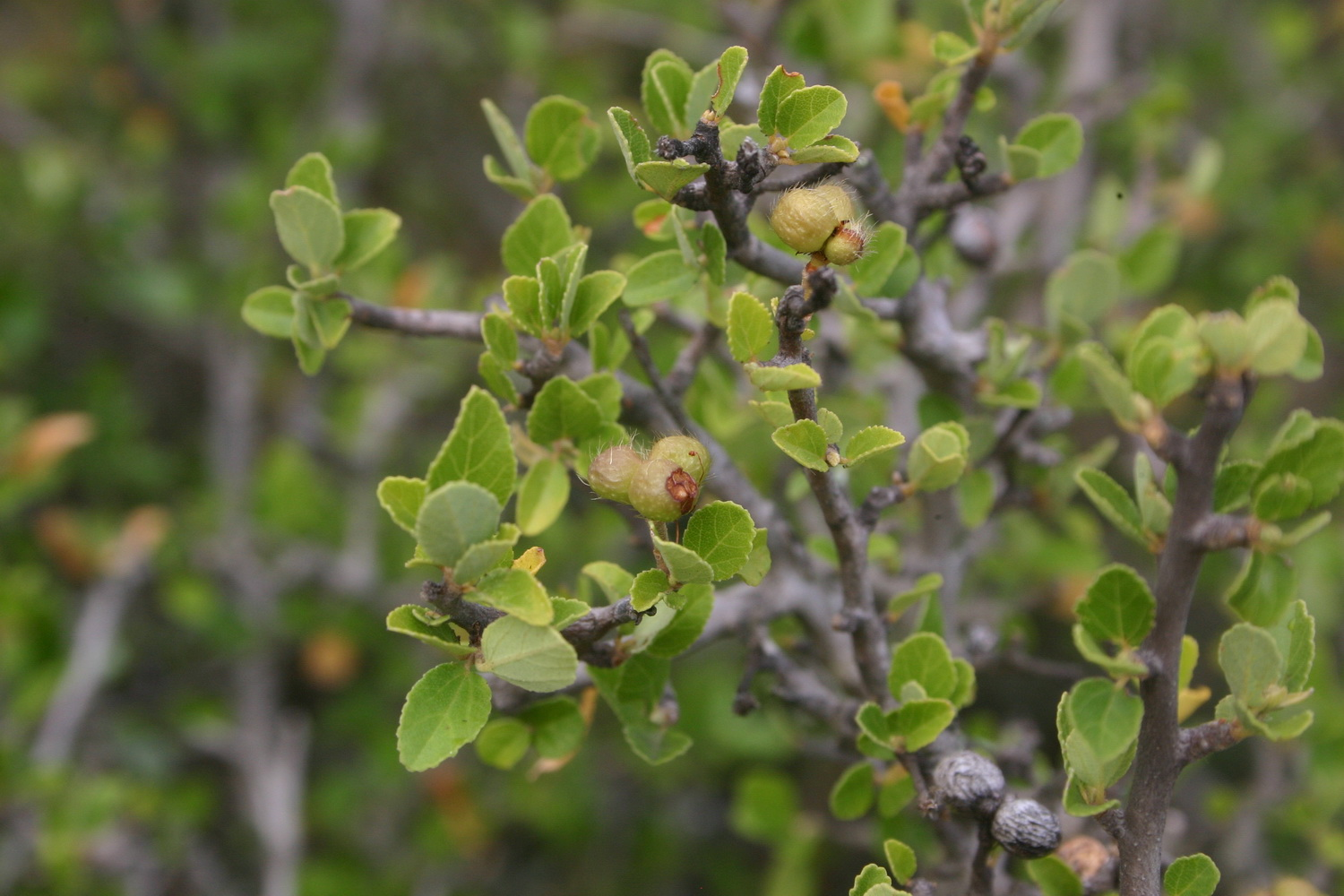
- Twigs, fruits and leaves
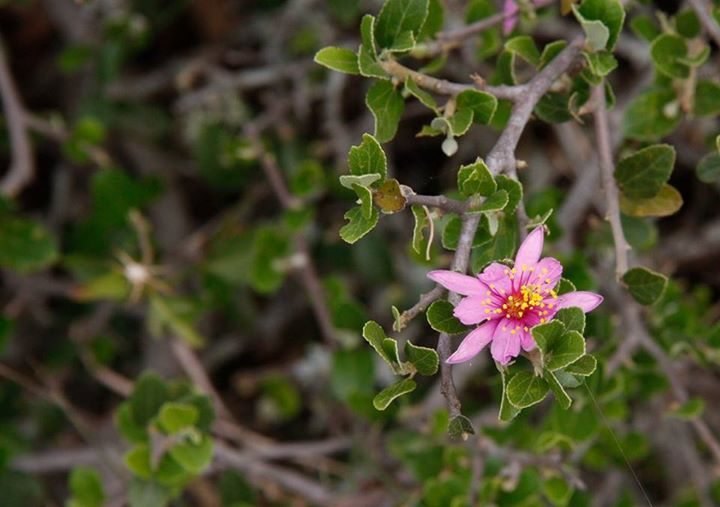
- Flower

Scientific classification
- Kingdom: Plantae
- Clade: Tracheophytes
- Clade: Angiosperms
- Clade: Eudicots
- Clade: Rosids
- Order: Malvales
- Family: Malvaceae
- Genus: Grewia
- Species: G. robusta

Binomial name
- Grewia robusta Burch.

Synonyms
- Grewia krebsiana Kuntze

= Grewia robusta =

Species of flowering plant

Grewia robusta is a multi-stemmed shrub or small tree, up to 3 m high, endemic to the semi-desert Karoo of South Africa, and very similar to Grewia occidentalis. It is one of some 325 species of Grewia in the family Malvaceae, and having a tropical African, Asian and Australian distribution. It is found in the arid regions of the Karoo and Eastern Cape, and generally prefers growing among dry scrub on rocky hillsides.

The species has a twiggy and rigid form, with grey bark, while abbreviated twigs give it a spiny appearance. The leathery leaves are fascicled and about 25 mm in length with very short petioles. Like most Grewias its leaves are markedly 3-veined from the base; leaf margins are bluntly toothed or crenate to almost entire. Flowers are small, bright pink and fragrant. The hairy fruits are fleshy drupes some 20 mm across, reddish brown when ripe and either entire or deeply 2- to 4-lobed. This species is favoured by browsing Black rhino.
