= Grewia bulot =

Scientific classification
- Kingdom: Plantae
- Clade: Tracheophytes
- Clade: Angiosperms
- Clade: Eudicots
- Clade: Rosids
- Order: Malvales
- Family: Malvaceae
- Genus: Grewia
- Species: G. bulot

Binomial name
- Grewia bulot Gagnep.

Species of flowering plant

Grewia bulot (Vietnamese bù lốt) is a species of flowering plant in the family Malvaceae, native to southern Vietnam. It is an indicator species of the Highland Floodplain community, along with Michelia floribunda, Polyalthia cerasoides, Nephelium lappaceum and Machilus odoratissimus.
