= Grewia kakothamnos =

Scientific classification
- Kingdom: Plantae
- Clade: Tracheophytes
- Clade: Angiosperms
- Clade: Eudicots
- Clade: Rosids
- Order: Malvales
- Family: Malvaceae
- Genus: Grewia
- Species: G. kakothamnos

Binomial name
- Grewia kakothamnos K.Schum.

Synonyms
- Grewia corallocarpa K.Schum.

Species of flowering plant

Grewia kakothamnos is a species of flowering plant in the family Malvaceae, found from southern Ethiopia to Tanzania. Its flowers are white to pale lilac, and its two or four-lobed fruit are orange when ripe, and edible in a famine situation. Grewia kakothamnos is particularly enjoyed as a forage by domestic goats (Capra aegagrus hircus), which will even eat the dead fallen leaves during the dry season.
