= Grewia sely =

Conservation status
- Critically Endangered (IUCN 3.1)

Scientific classification
- Kingdom: Plantae
- Clade: Tracheophytes
- Clade: Angiosperms
- Clade: Eudicots
- Clade: Rosids
- Order: Malvales
- Family: Malvaceae
- Genus: Grewia
- Species: G. sely

Binomial name
- Grewia sely R.Vig.

Synonyms
- Vincentia sely (R.Vig.) Burret; Vinticena sely (R.Vig.) Burret

Species of flowering plant

Grewia sely is a species of flowering plant in the family Malvaceae, native to Madagascar. It is known from only two locations on the island, and is critically endangered.

== Description ==
Grewia sely is a small shrub, growing up to 3 meters (9.8 ft) tall. It can be distinguished from the other members of its genus growing on Madagascar by its leaves, which are not acuminate at their apices.

== Range and habitat ==
Grewia sely is known from only two locations, 1,395 km (867 mi) apart, in northern Sava Region at the northern end of the island, and Anosy region at Madagascar's southern end.

It is found in dry deciduous forest on lateritic soils near the coast, between sea level and 28 meters (92 ft) elevation.

== Conservation and threats ==
The two subpopulations are severely fragmented, and are genetically isolated. The species is threatened with habitat loss from shifting cultivation and conversion to agriculture. The northern subpopulation occurs in Loky-Manambato protected area. Its conservation status is assessed as critically endangered.
