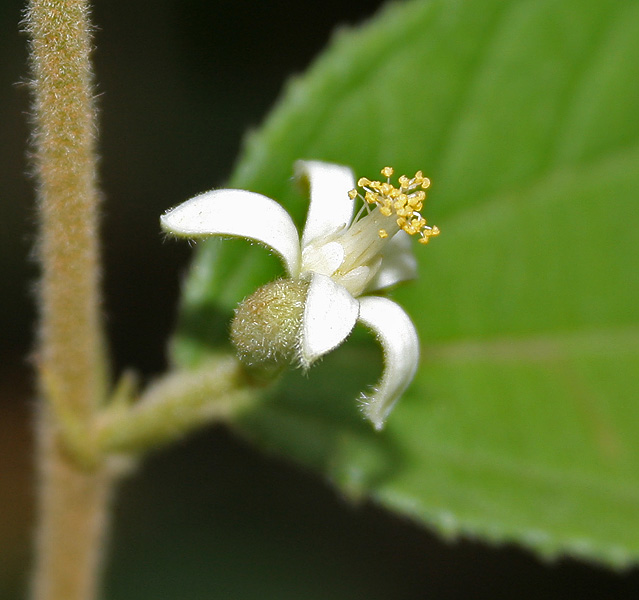

Scientific classification
- Kingdom: Plantae
- Clade: Tracheophytes
- Clade: Angiosperms
- Clade: Eudicots
- Clade: Rosids
- Order: Malvales
- Family: Malvaceae
- Genus: Grewia
- Species: G. hirsuta

Binomial name
- Grewia hirsuta Vahl

= Grewia hirsuta =

Species of flowering plant

Grewia hirsuta is an Asian species of flowering plant in the mallow family, Malvaceae.
