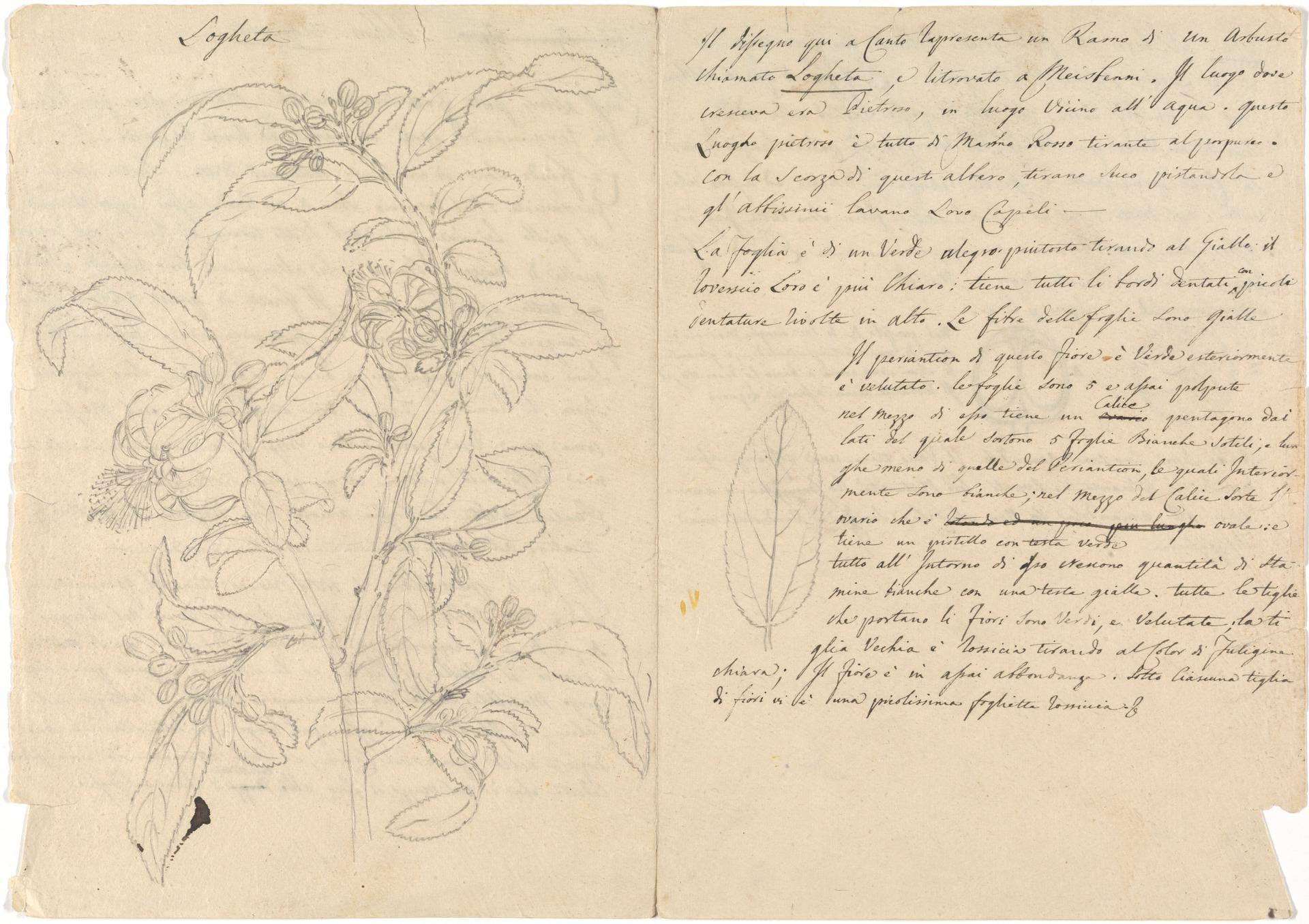
- Botanical illustration by Luigi Balugani (1737-1770)

Scientific classification
- Kingdom: Plantae
- Clade: Tracheophytes
- Clade: Angiosperms
- Clade: Eudicots
- Clade: Rosids
- Order: Malvales
- Family: Malvaceae
- Genus: Grewia
- Species: G. ferruginea

Binomial name
- Grewia ferruginea Hochst. ex A.Rich.

Synonyms
- Grewia beguinotii Lanza

= Grewia ferruginea =

Species of flowering plant

Grewia ferruginea is a species of flowering plant in the family Malvaceae, widespread in Ethiopia, and also found in Sudan, Eritrea, and Kenya. Local people in Ethiopia feed it to cows suffering from retained placentas, as aids in placental expulsion.
