= Grewia mollis =

Conservation status
- Least Concern (IUCN 3.1)

Scientific classification
- Kingdom: Plantae
- Clade: Tracheophytes
- Clade: Angiosperms
- Clade: Eudicots
- Clade: Rosids
- Order: Malvales
- Family: Malvaceae
- Genus: Grewia
- Species: G. mollis

Binomial name
- Grewia mollis Juss.

Synonyms
- Grewia africana Mill.; Grewia petitiana A.Rich.; Grewia velutina Franch.; Grewia venusta Fresen.

Species of flowering plant

Grewia mollis is a widespread species of flowering plant in the family Malvaceae, native to tropical Africa, Yemen and Oman. It is the source of grewia gum, an edible polysaccharide mucilage, similar in its properties to tragacanth gum.

It can be affected by a smut fungi, called Pericladium grewiae Pass., which was found on a plant in Eritrea.
