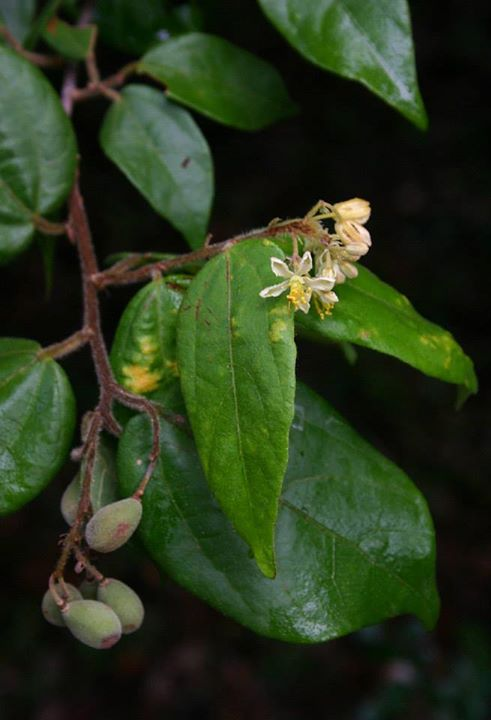

Conservation status
- Least Concern (IUCN 3.1)

Scientific classification
- Kingdom: Plantae
- Clade: Tracheophytes
- Clade: Angiosperms
- Clade: Eudicots
- Clade: Rosids
- Order: Malvales
- Family: Malvaceae
- Genus: Grewia
- Species: G. transzambesica

Binomial name
- Grewia transzambesica Wild

Synonyms
- Grewia heterotricha Burret (illegitimate name)

= Grewia transzambesica =

Species of flowering plant

Grewia transzambesica is a species of flowering plant in the family Malvaceae sensu lato or Tiliaceae or Sparrmanniaceae. It is found only in Mozambique.

This species is a shrub or small tree up to 7m tall occurring in Brachystegia woodland on the coastal plains to the north and south of the Zambezi.

First published as Grewia transzambesica Wild in Bol. Soc. Brot., Sér. 2, 31: 81, t. 1 fig. A (1957). TAB. 4 fig. A. Type: Mozambique, Beira, Simão 1260 (LM; SRGH, holotype).
