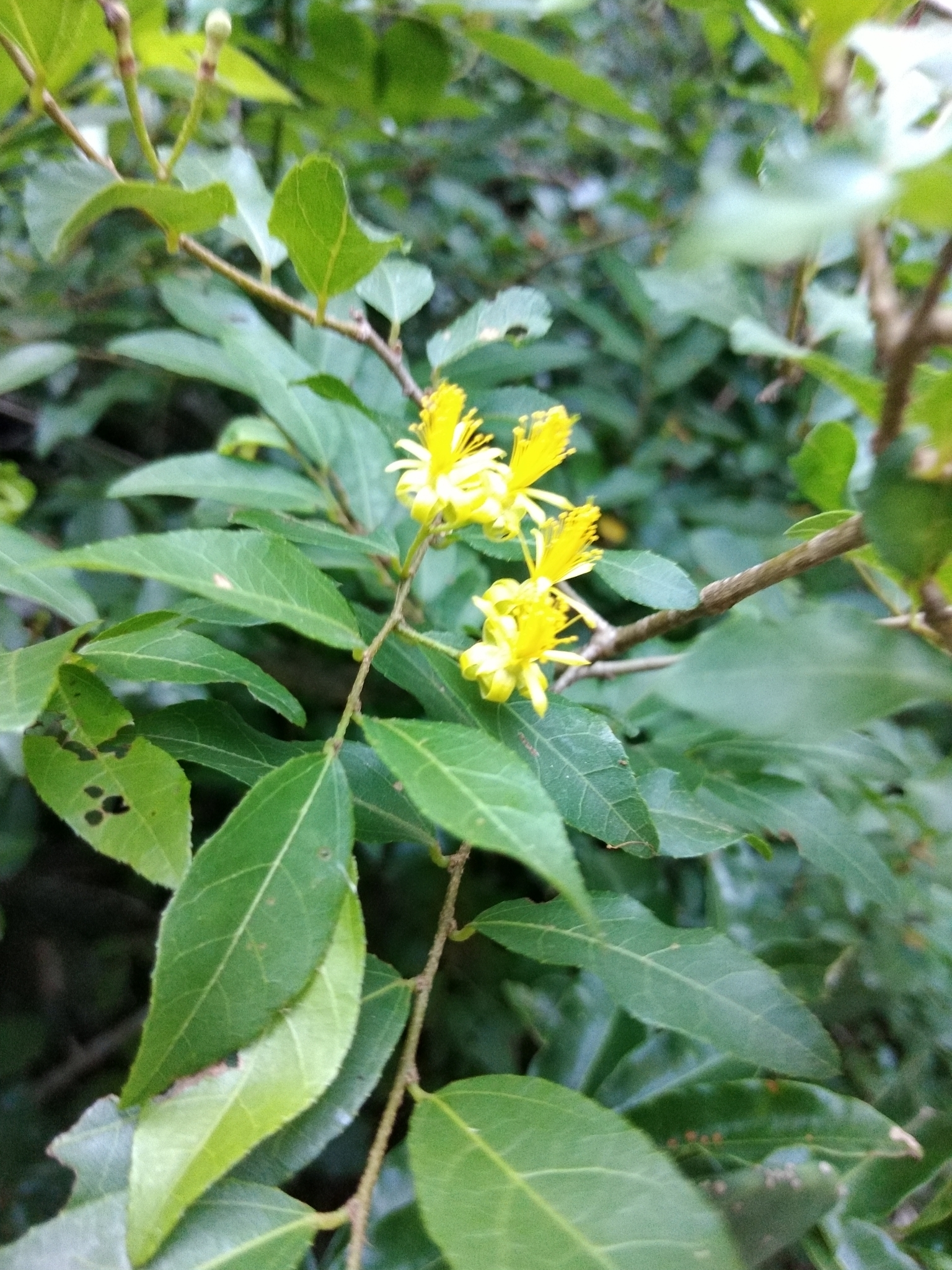

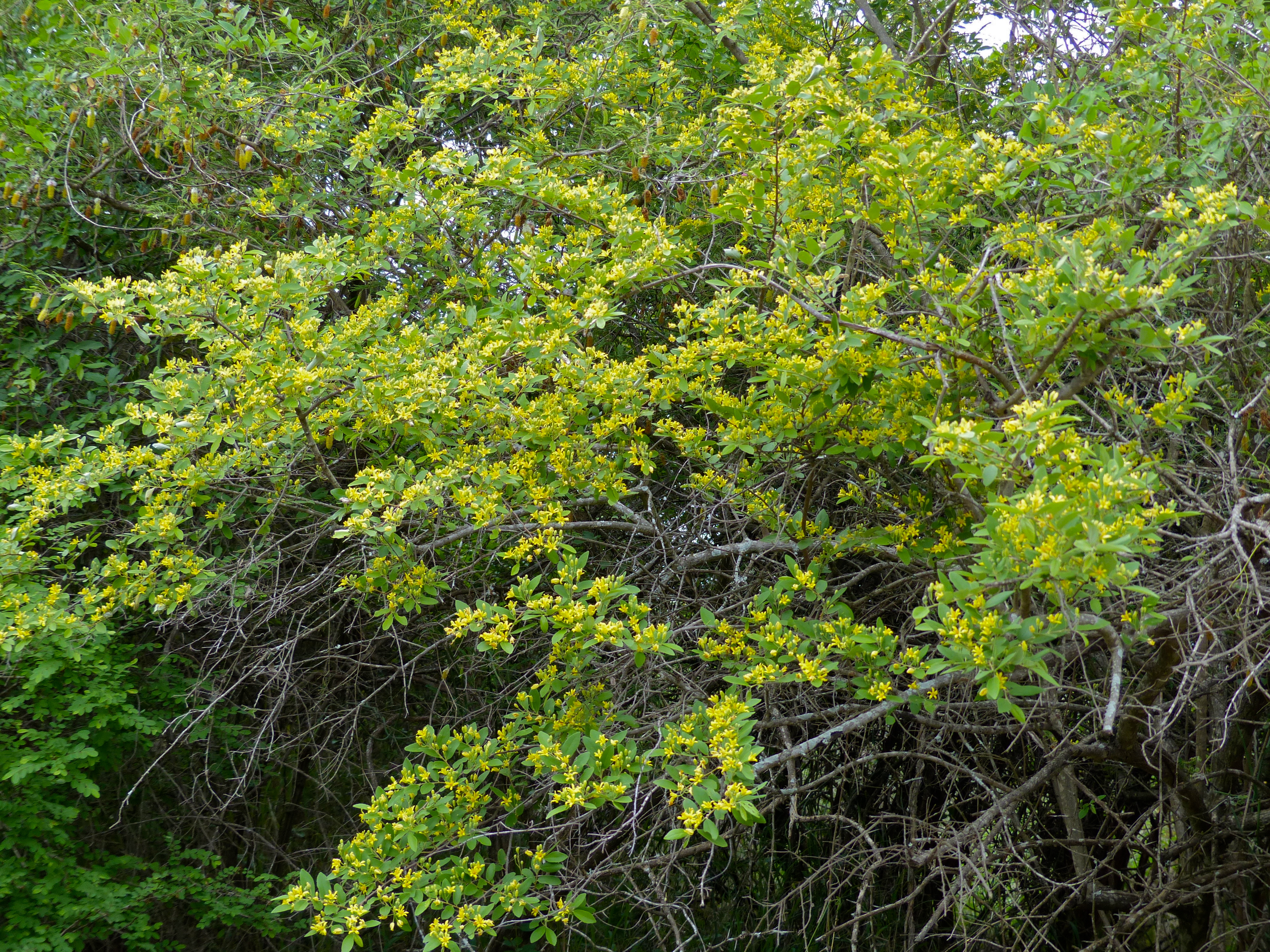

Conservation status
- Least Concern (SANBI Red List)

Scientific classification
- Kingdom: Plantae
- Clade: Tracheophytes
- Clade: Angiosperms
- Clade: Eudicots
- Clade: Rosids
- Order: Malvales
- Family: Malvaceae
- Genus: Grewia
- Species: G. afra

Binomial name
- Grewia afra Meisn.

Synonyms
- Grewia caffra

= Grewia afra =

Plant endemic to Southern Africa

Grewia afra, the climbing raisin, is a species of climbing tree endemic to eastern Southern Africa.

== Range ==
In South Africa, Grewia afra is found in KwaZulu-Natal, Limpopo and Mpumalanga.

== Taxonomy ==
Previously, Grewia afra was listed as Grewia caffra.

== Gallery ==
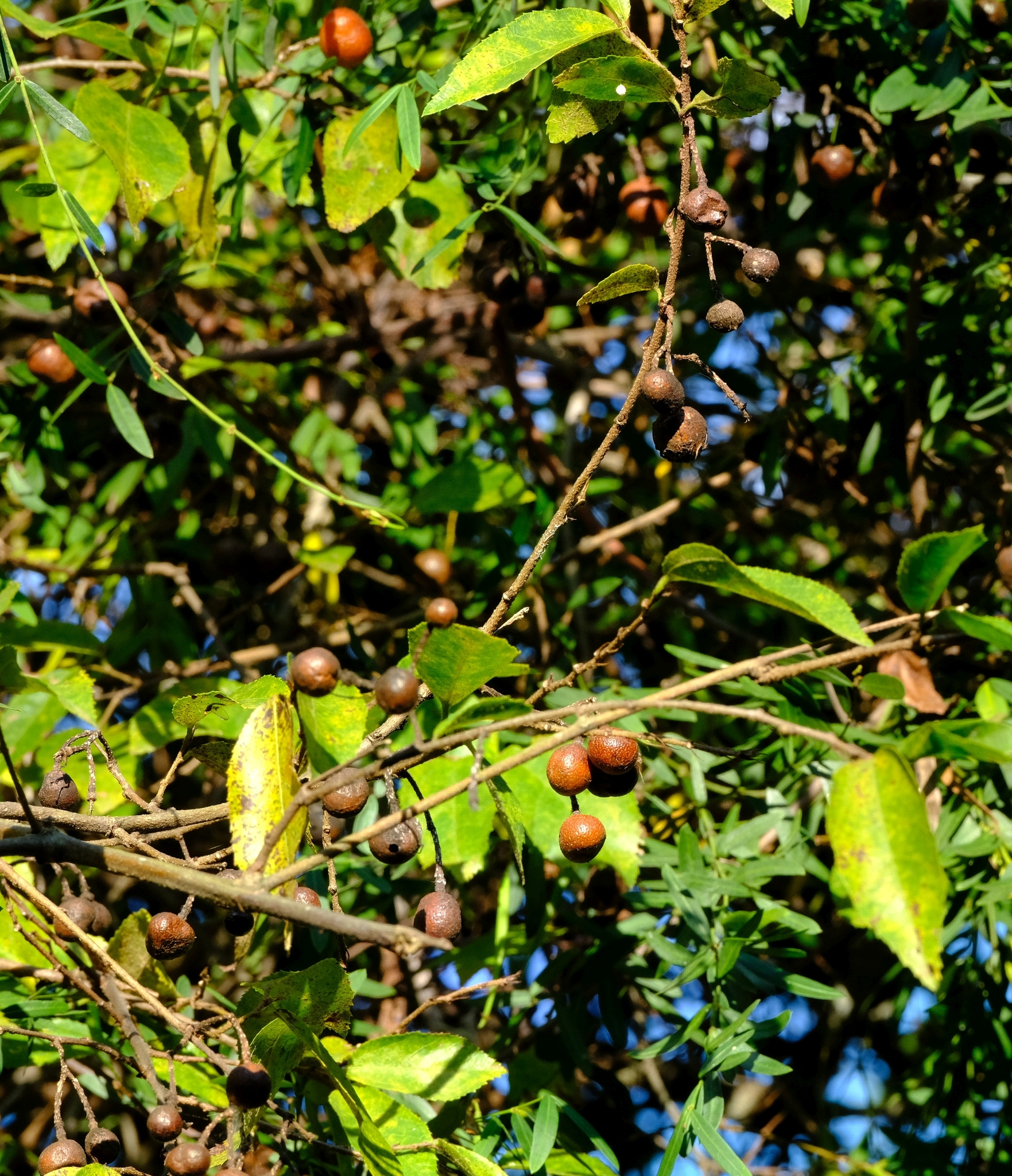
Maturing fruit

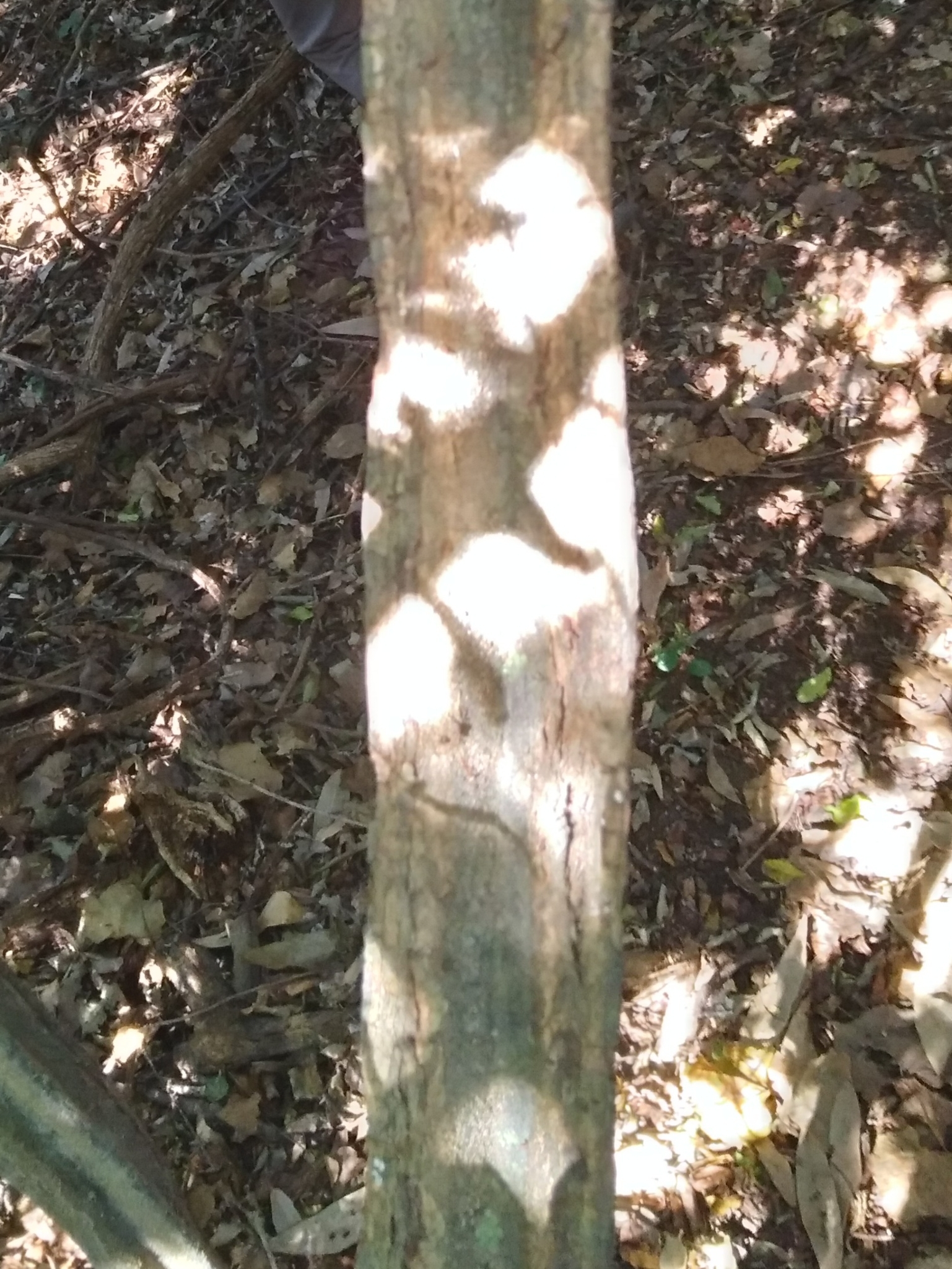
Trunk

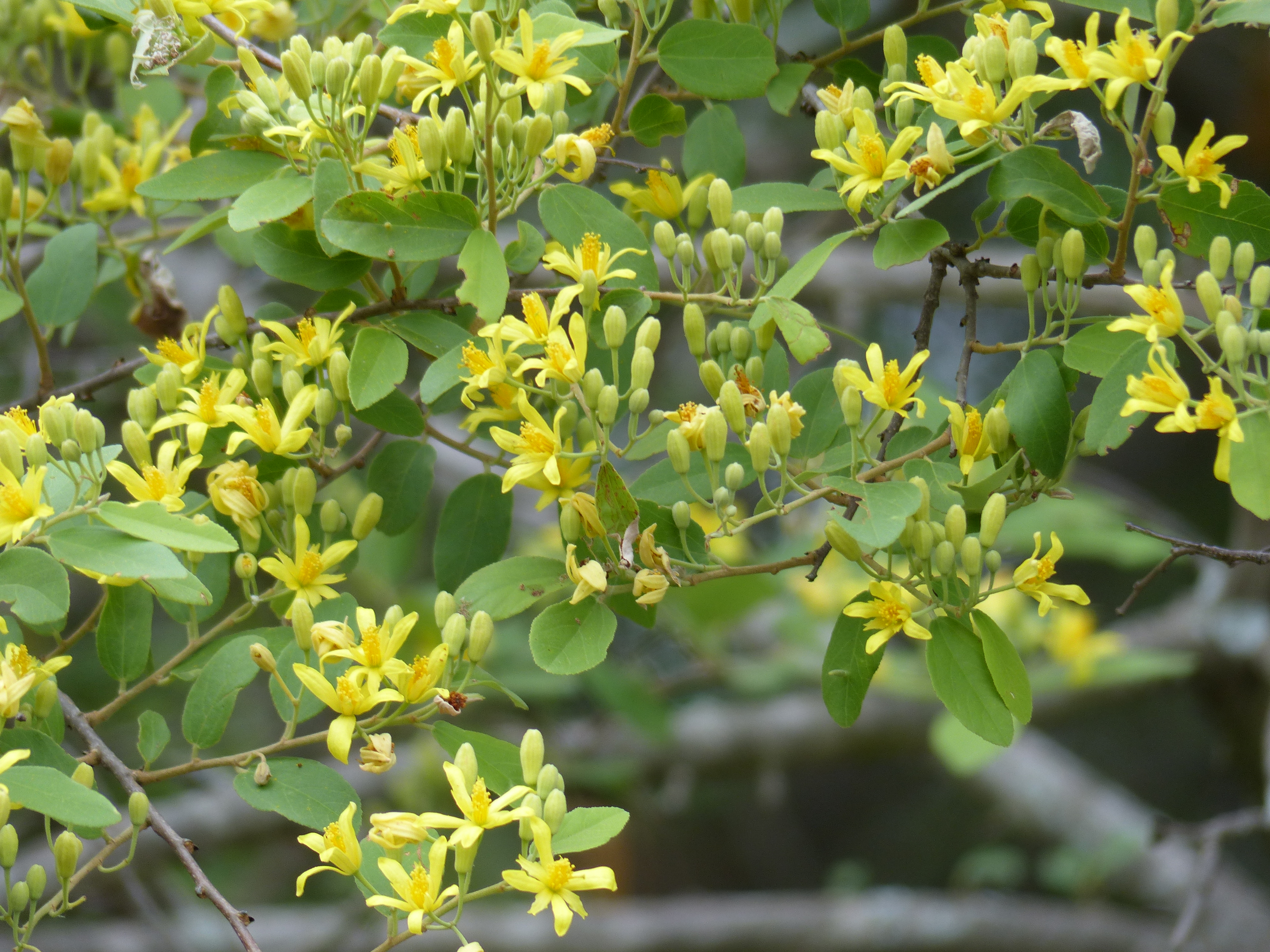
Flowers

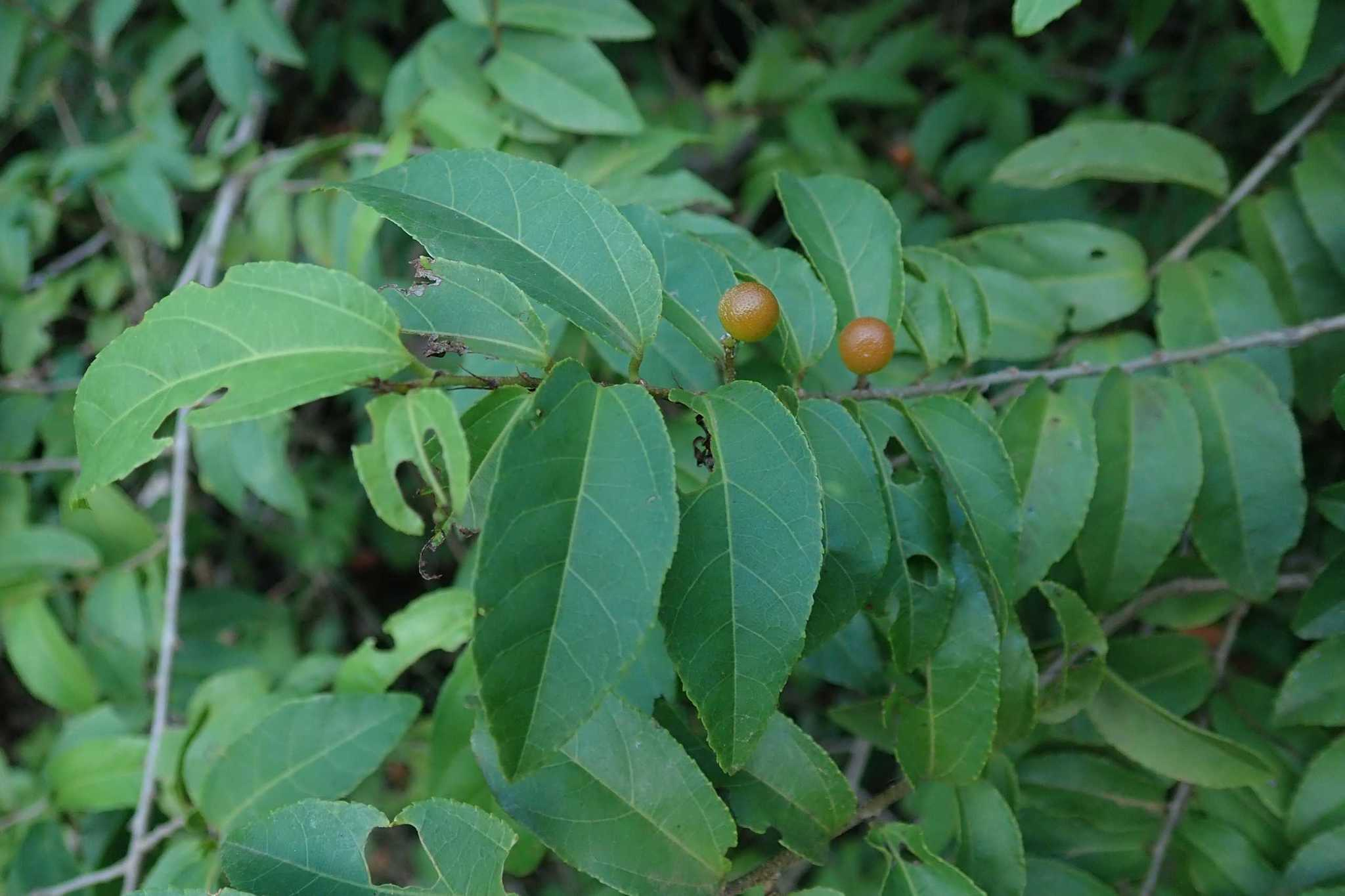
Leaves
