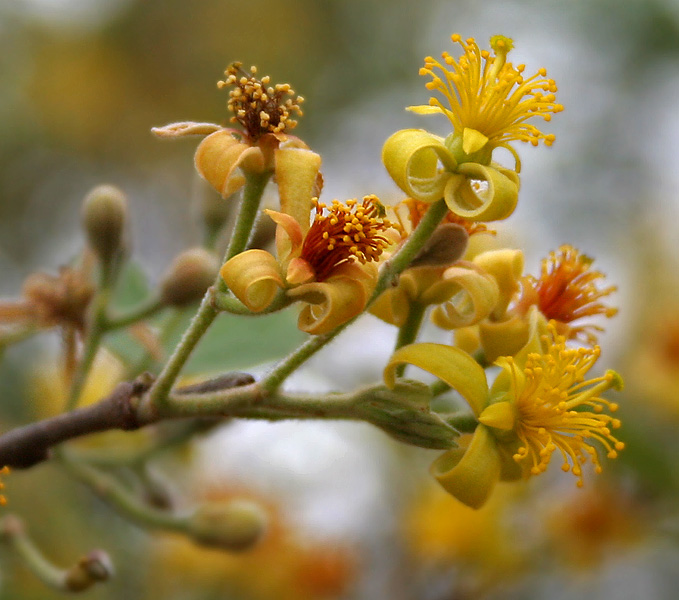

Scientific classification
- Kingdom: Plantae
- Clade: Tracheophytes
- Clade: Angiosperms
- Clade: Eudicots
- Clade: Rosids
- Order: Malvales
- Family: Malvaceae
- Genus: Grewia
- Species: G. tiliifolia

Binomial name
- Grewia tiliifolia Vahl

Synonyms
- Grewia arborea Roxb. ex Rottler; Grewia damine Gaertn.; Grewia leptopetala Brandis; Grewia rotunda C.Y.Wu ex Hung T.Chang; Microcos lateriflora L.

= Grewia tiliifolia =

Species of fruit and plant

Grewia tiliifolia (syn. Grewia damine) is a species of flowering plant in the family Malvaceae sensu lato. A tree reaching 8 m (26 ft), it is found in monsoon and intermediate forest gaps and fringes of Sri Lanka, where the plant is known as "daminiya" in Sinhala and "taṭacci" in Tamil. It is also found in Pakistan (Sind, Punjab), India (Punjab, Madhya Pradesh, Peninsula), Nepal and Southeast Asia. Grewia tiliifolia is used in traditional medicine, using bark and roots for fractures, diarrhoea and skin diseases. Its wood is used for tool handles. The fruit is edible.
