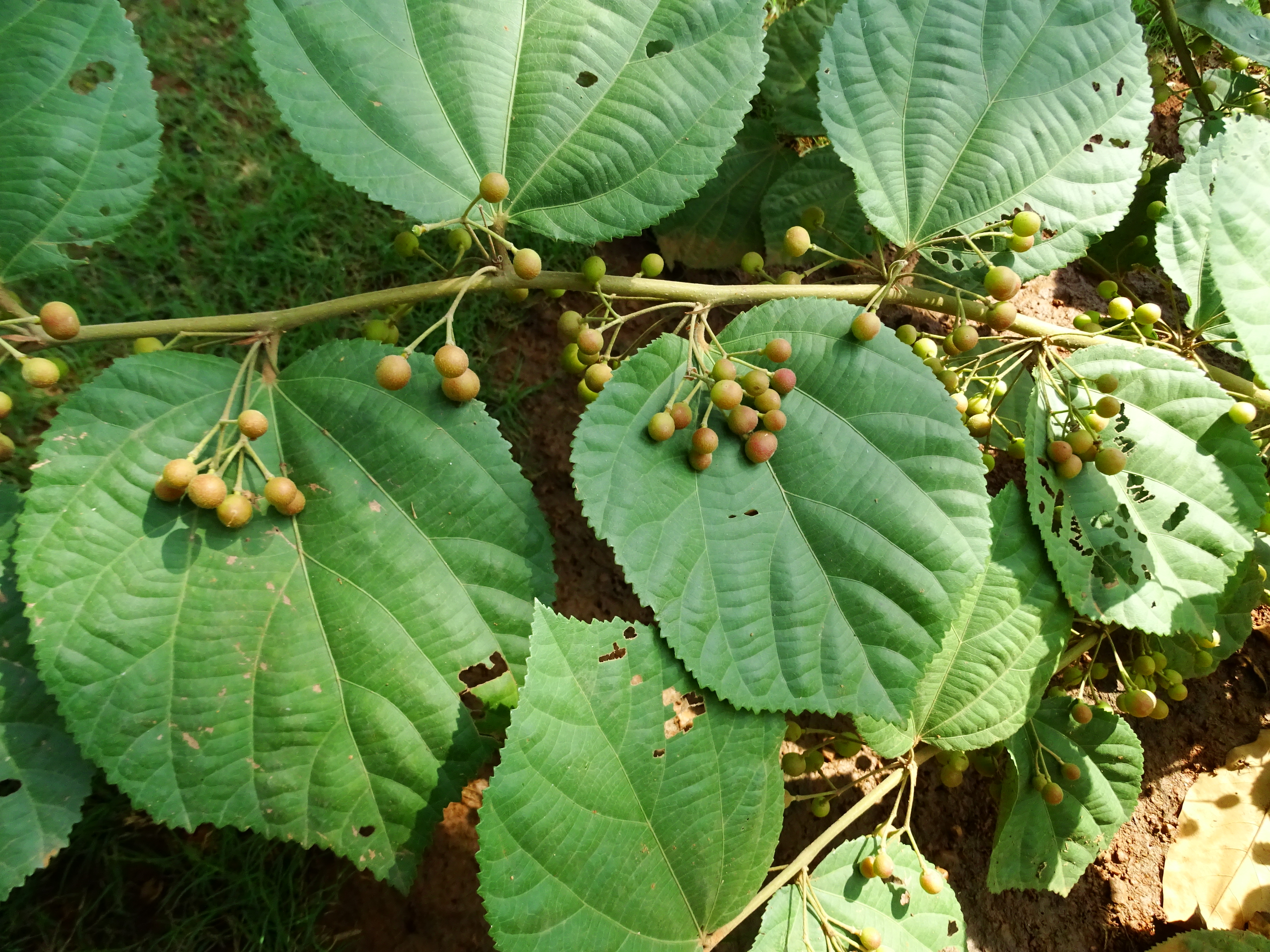
- Leaves and fruit
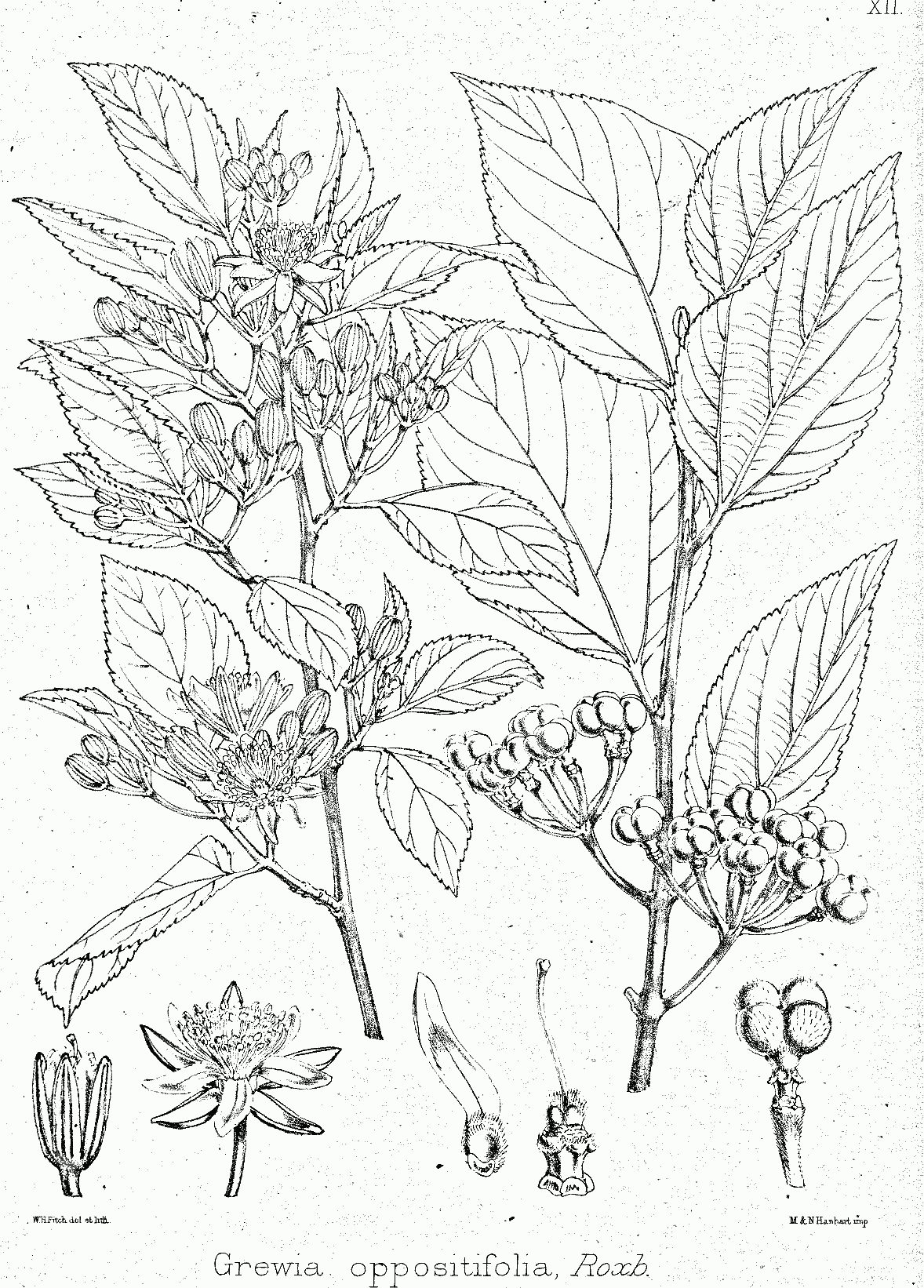
- Botanical illustration

Conservation status
- Least Concern (IUCN 3.1)

Scientific classification
- Kingdom: Plantae
- Clade: Tracheophytes
- Clade: Angiosperms
- Clade: Eudicots
- Clade: Rosids
- Order: Malvales
- Family: Malvaceae
- Genus: Grewia
- Species: G. optiva

Binomial name
- Grewia optiva J.R.Drumm. ex Burret

Synonyms
- Grewia oppositifolia Buch.-Ham. ex Roxb.

= Grewia optiva =

Species of flowering plant

Grewia optiva, the bhimal, is a species of flowering plant in the family Malvaceae, native to the Indian Subcontinent.

A small tree, it has a number of agro-forestry uses. It is a good forage species, particularly in winter when no other leafy green fodder is available. Bhimal is one of the species preferred most by cattle. It is used in agro-forestry systems in the western Himalaya, in an intercropping system with plants such as taro (Colocasia esculenta) and turmeric (Curcuma longa). The resilient timber is used for firewood, and for items such as bows, oars, poles, and tool handles.
