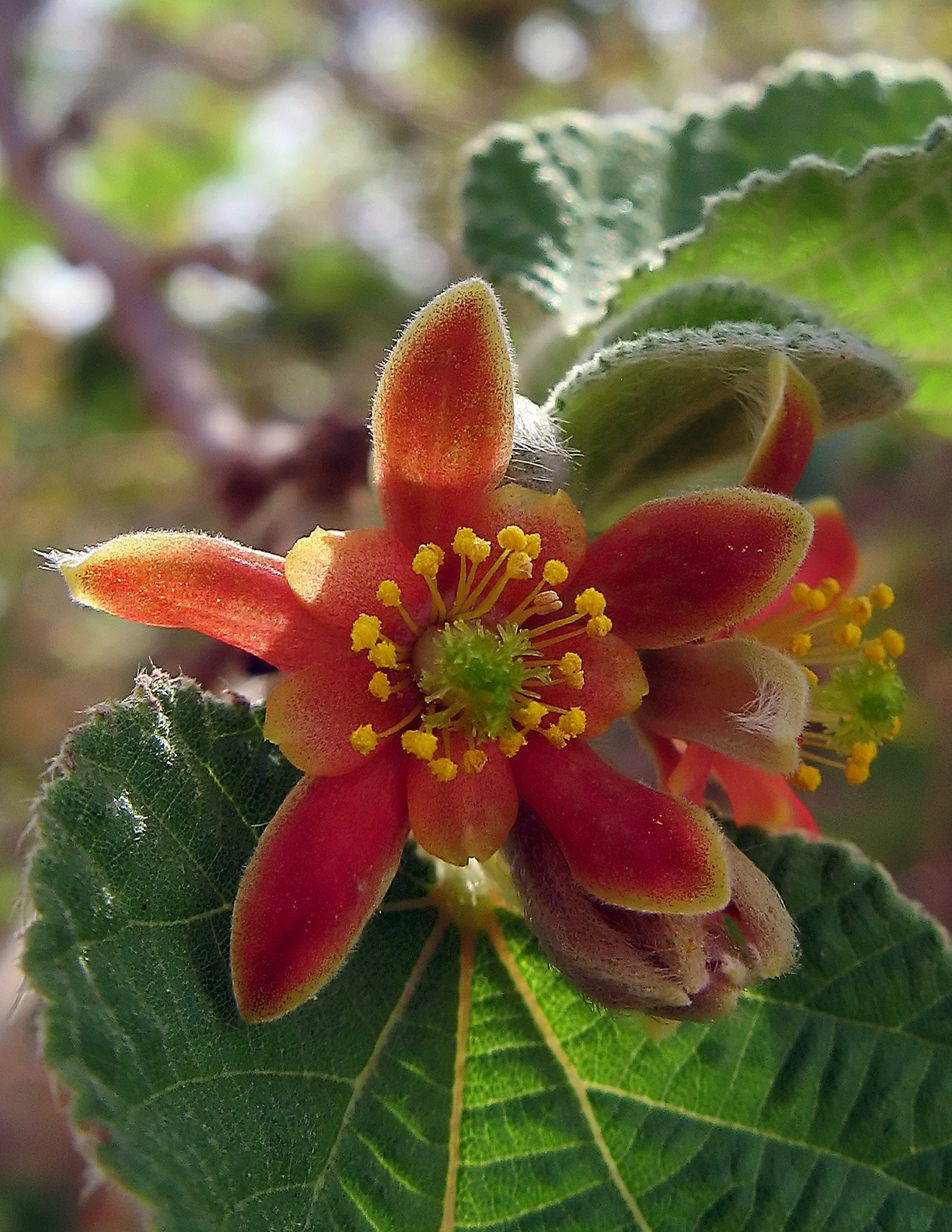

Conservation status
- Least Concern (IUCN 3.1)

Scientific classification
- Kingdom: Plantae
- Clade: Tracheophytes
- Clade: Angiosperms
- Clade: Eudicots
- Clade: Rosids
- Order: Malvales
- Family: Malvaceae
- Genus: Grewia
- Species: G. villosa

Binomial name
- Grewia villosa Willd.

Synonyms
- Balmeda corylifolia Nocca; Grewia chaunothamnus K.Schum.; Grewia corylifolia A.Rich.; Grewia echinulata Delile; Grewia heynei Steud.; Grewia micropetala Bertol.; Grewia orbiculata G.Don [Illegitimate]; Grewia villifera Sweet; Grewia villosa B.Heyne ex Roth [Illegitimate]; Grewia villosa var. glabrior K.Schum.; Tridermia papillosa Raf.

= Grewia villosa =

Species of tree

Grewia villosa is a shrub, often scrambling and hardly exceeding 4 m in height. Leaves are fairly large, serrated and heart-shaped. It grows naturally, mainly in dry habitats. It is common in most of the semi-arid parts of Eastern Africa but may now be rare in parts of its natural distribution. It can be seen in Ein Gedi oasis in Israel, and in South Africa, where it is common. Its ripe copper-coloured fruits are eaten in East Africa.

== Uses ==
The fruit of the Grewia villosa were eaten both while immature and green and also once they had ripened and hardened to a dark, reddish-brown. The bark was stripped off and crushed in water or chewed to a pulp which was used to wash the body as well as to clean the hair and disinfect the scalp

== See also ==
- List of Southern African indigenous trees
