= Grewia insularis =

Scientific classification
- Kingdom: Plantae
- Clade: Tracheophytes
- Clade: Angiosperms
- Clade: Eudicots
- Clade: Rosids
- Order: Malvales
- Family: Malvaceae
- Genus: Grewia
- Species: G. insularis

Binomial name
- Grewia insularis Ridl.

Species of flowering plant

Grewia insularis is a species of flowering plant in the Malvaceae, or mallow family, that is endemic to Christmas Island, an Australian territory in the north-eastern Indian Ocean. Its specific epithet is the Latin for insular, referring to its island location.

== Description ==
Grewia insularis is a shrub or small tree. Its leaves are oblong to ovate, 40–110 mm long. The yellow flowers are usually 1–3 in an umbel, often with several umbels from one leaf-axil. The fruit is purple, often reduced to a subglobose drupe about 3 mm long.

== Distribution and habitat ==
Found only on Christmas Island, it occurs on the terraces on the northern coast.

== Relationships ==
The fruit and flowers of G. insularis are similar to those of G. glabra, while the shape of its leaves closely resemble those of G. eriocarpa.
