= Grewia goetzeana =

Conservation status
- Data Deficient (IUCN 2.3)

Scientific classification
- Kingdom: Plantae
- Clade: Tracheophytes
- Clade: Angiosperms
- Clade: Eudicots
- Clade: Rosids
- Order: Malvales
- Family: Malvaceae
- Genus: Grewia
- Species: G. goetzeana

Binomial name
- Grewia goetzeana K.Schum.

Synonyms
- Grewia caducisepala K.Schum.

Species of flowering plant

Grewia goetzeana is a species of flowering plant in the family Malvaceae sensu lato or Tiliaceae or Sparrmanniaceae. It is found only in Tanzania.
