= Grewia retinervis =

Conservation status
- Least Concern (IUCN 3.1)

Scientific classification
- Kingdom: Plantae
- Clade: Tracheophytes
- Clade: Angiosperms
- Clade: Eudicots
- Clade: Rosids
- Order: Malvales
- Family: Malvaceae
- Genus: Grewia
- Species: G. retinervis

Binomial name
- Grewia retinervis Burret

Species of plant

Grewia retinervis (Afrikaans: basterskurweblaarrosyntjie, roughly translated "Baster curved-leaf grape") is a plant native to Namibia and South Africa. It is found in the North West and Limpopo provinces and is listed as "safe" (LC) by the SANBI Red List.
