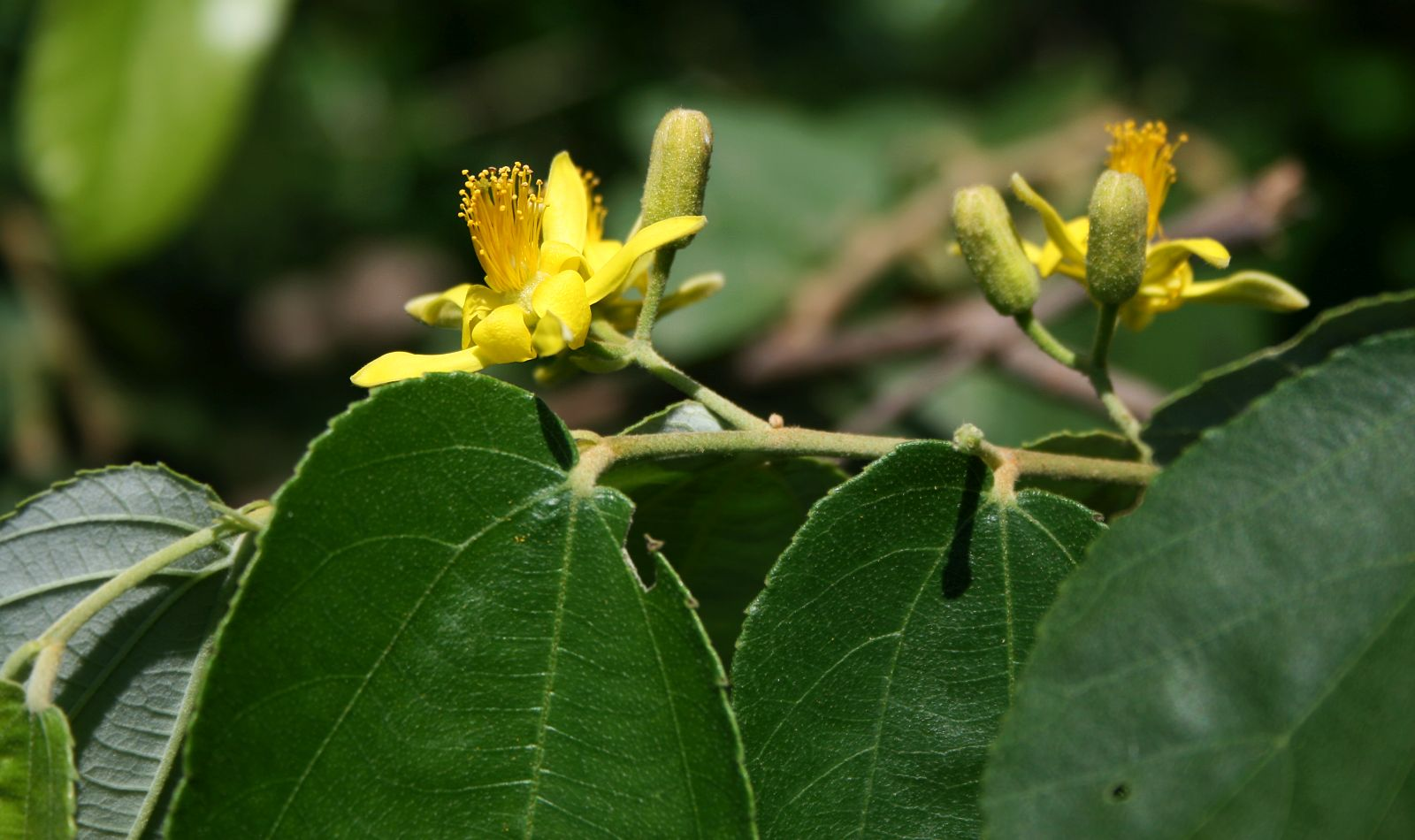
- Close-up of flowers
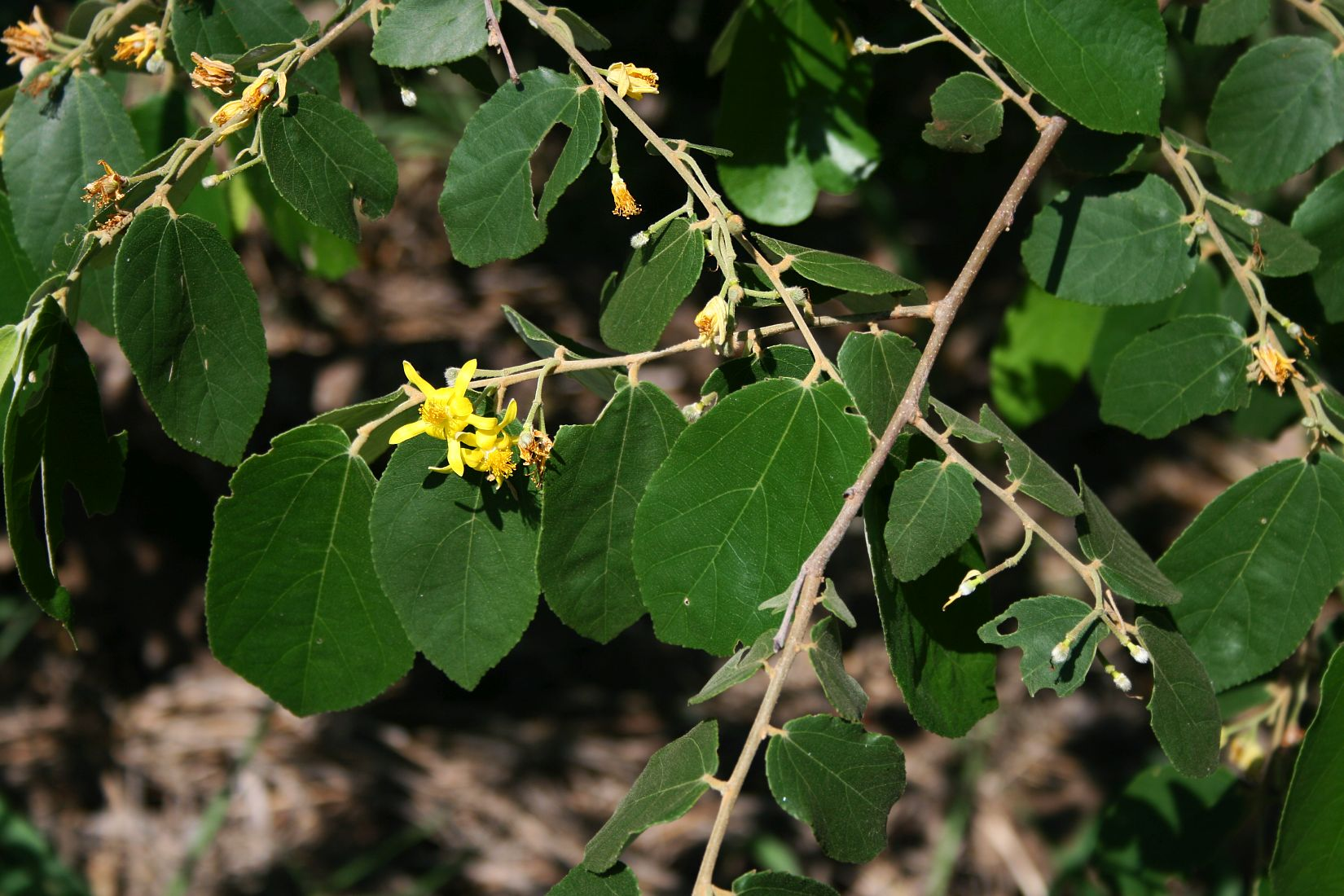
- View of foliage

Conservation status
- Least Concern (IUCN 3.1)

Scientific classification
- Kingdom: Plantae
- Clade: Tracheophytes
- Clade: Angiosperms
- Clade: Eudicots
- Clade: Rosids
- Order: Malvales
- Family: Malvaceae
- Genus: Grewia
- Species: G. hexamita

Binomial name
- Grewia hexamita Burret

Synonyms
- Grewia dumicola Exell; Grewia megistocarpa Burret; Grewia messinica Burtt Davy & Greenway; Grewia schweickerdtii Burret

= Grewia hexamita =

Species of flowering plant

Grewia hexamita, the giant raisin, is a species of flowering plant in the family Malvaceae, native to Mozambique and adjoining countries. It is a large tree for a Grewia, reaching 5 m (16 ft). It is the most preferred woody plant of African savanna elephants (Loxodonta africana), who browse on it in all seasons, unlike even other species of Grewia.
