= Grewia rothii =

Scientific classification
- Kingdom: Plantae
- Clade: Tracheophytes
- Clade: Angiosperms
- Clade: Eudicots
- Clade: Rosids
- Order: Malvales
- Family: Malvaceae
- Genus: Grewia
- Species: G. rothii

Binomial name
- Grewia rothii DC

Synonyms
- Grewia bicolor Roth. [Illegitimate]

Species of flowering plant

Grewia rothii is a species of flowering plant in India and Sri Lanka.

== In culture ==
Known as "bora daminiya" in Sinhala and "taviddai" in Tamil.

== Physiology ==
Flowers - small, polygamous; Inflorescence- umbels, 1-4 in axils.

== Uses ==
Bark is used in fiber industry.
