= Grewia picta =

Conservation status
- Least Concern (IUCN 3.1)

Scientific classification
- Kingdom: Plantae
- Clade: Tracheophytes
- Clade: Angiosperms
- Clade: Eudicots
- Clade: Rosids
- Order: Malvales
- Family: Malvaceae
- Genus: Grewia
- Species: G. picta

Binomial name
- Grewia picta Baill.

Synonyms
- Grewia aldabrensis Baker

Species of flowering plant

Grewia picta is a species of flowering plant in the family Malvaceae. It is found only in Seychelles. It is threatened by habitat loss.
