= Grewia turbinata =

Conservation status
- Vulnerable (IUCN 3.1)

Scientific classification
- Kingdom: Plantae
- Clade: Tracheophytes
- Clade: Angiosperms
- Clade: Eudicots
- Clade: Rosids
- Order: Malvales
- Family: Malvaceae
- Genus: Grewia
- Species: G. turbinata

Binomial name
- Grewia turbinata Balf.f. (1882)

Synonyms
- Vincentia turbinata (Balf.f.) Burret (1926); Vinticena turbinata (Balf.f.) Burret (1935)

Species of plant

Grewia turbinata is a species of flowering plant in the family Malvaceae sensu lato or Tiliaceae or Sparrmanniaceae. It is a shrub or tree endemic to the island of Socotra in Yemen. It grows in semi-deciduous woodland in the Hajhir Mountains and adjacent limestone plateau from 200 to 650 metres elevation.
