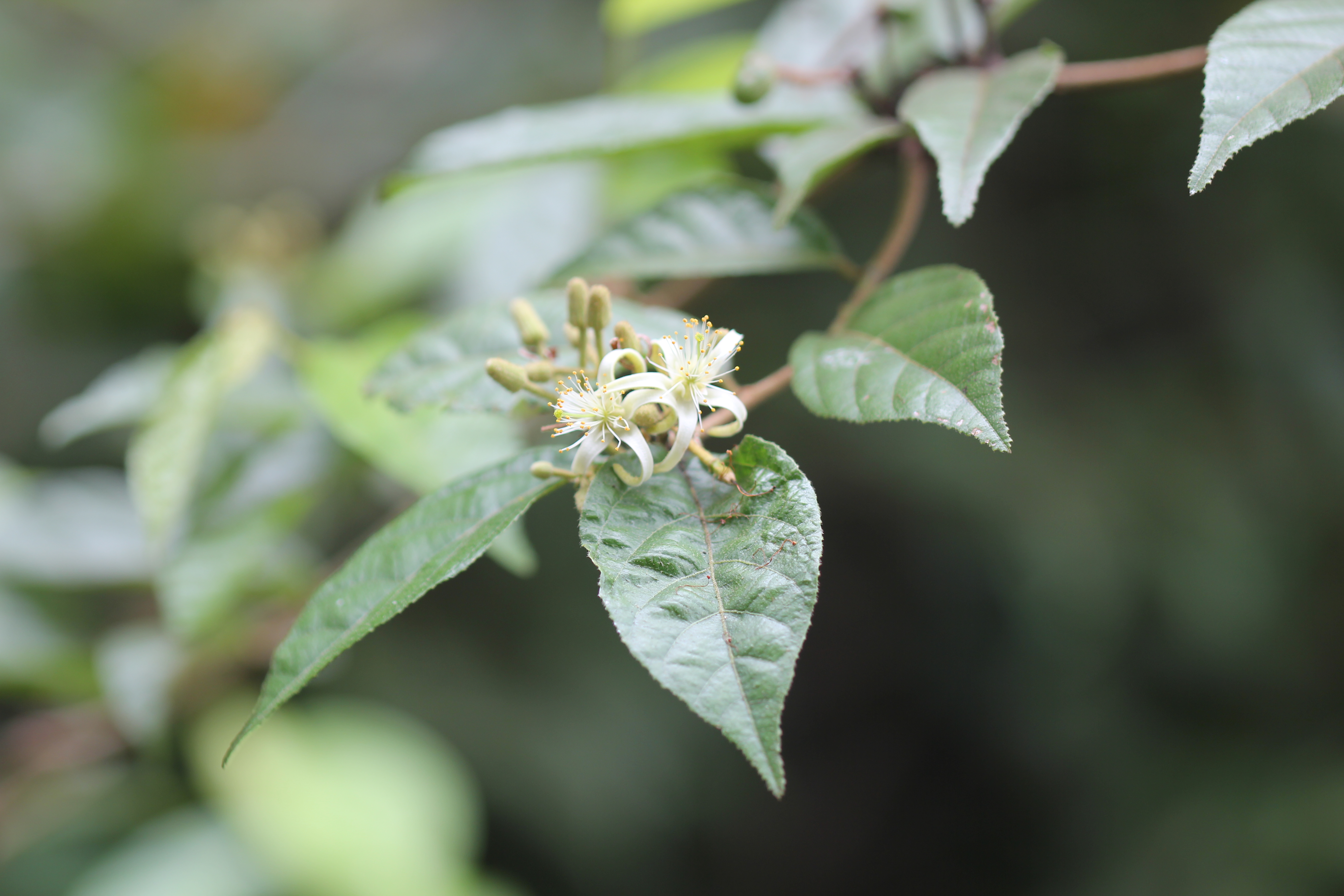

Scientific classification
- Kingdom: Plantae
- Clade: Tracheophytes
- Clade: Angiosperms
- Clade: Eudicots
- Clade: Rosids
- Order: Malvales
- Family: Malvaceae
- Genus: Grewia
- Species: G. orientalis

Binomial name
- Grewia orientalis L.

Synonyms
- Columbia serratifolia Blanco.; Grewia columnaris Sm.; Grewia furfuracea Salisb.; Grewia orientalis Vahl. [Illegitimate]; Grewia orientalis var. latifolia Benth.

= Grewia orientalis =

Species of flowering plant

Grewia orientalis is a species of flowering plant in India and Sri Lanka.
