= Grewia similis =

Scientific classification
- Kingdom: Plantae
- Clade: Tracheophytes
- Clade: Angiosperms
- Clade: Eudicots
- Clade: Rosids
- Order: Malvales
- Family: Malvaceae
- Genus: Grewia
- Species: G. similis

Binomial name
- Grewia similis K.Schum.

Synonyms
- Grewia coerulea K.Schum.

Species of flowering plant

Grewia similis is a species of flowering plant in the family Malvaceae, native to the Democratic Republic of the Congo, eastern Tropical Africa, and Ethiopia. It is the preferred browse species of eastern black rhinoceroses (Diceros bicornis michaeli).
