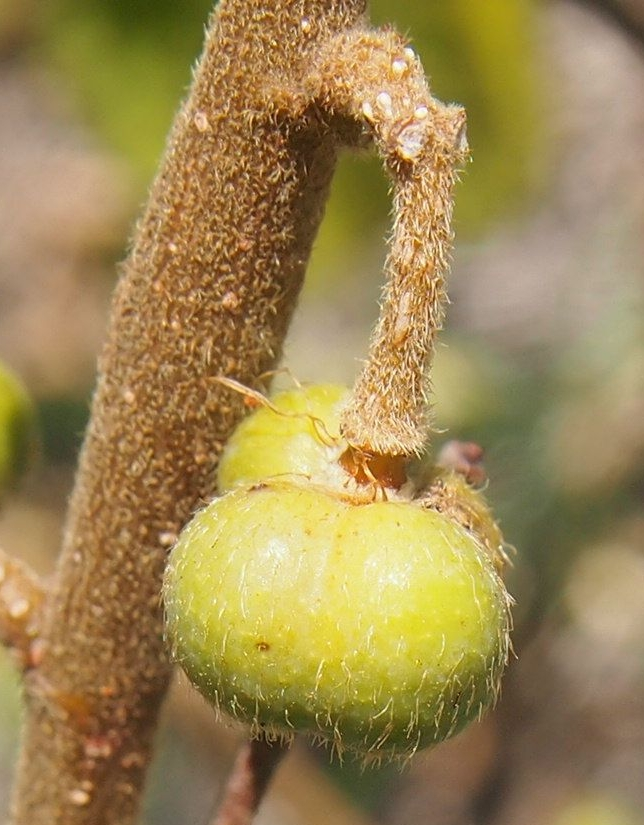

Conservation status
- Least Concern (IUCN 3.1)

Scientific classification
- Kingdom: Plantae
- Clade: Tracheophytes
- Clade: Angiosperms
- Clade: Eudicots
- Clade: Rosids
- Order: Malvales
- Family: Malvaceae
- Genus: Grewia
- Species: G. retusifolia

Binomial name
- Grewia retusifolia Kurz.

= Grewia retusifolia =

Species of flowering plant

Grewia retusifolia is a shrub species in the family Malvaceae. Common names include dysentery bush, emu-berry, dog's balls, turkey bush and diddle diddle. It is widespread in tropical and subtropical areas of Eastern Australia and Northern Western Australia. The species produces small, sweet, two-lobed fruit with a fibrous acidic pulp surrounding the seeds. Leichhardt described the fruits as having a very agreeable taste, which could be boiled to make a refreshing drink. Indigenous Australians use the bark and leaves in medications. The crushed leaves were used as a poultice to relieve toothaches.
