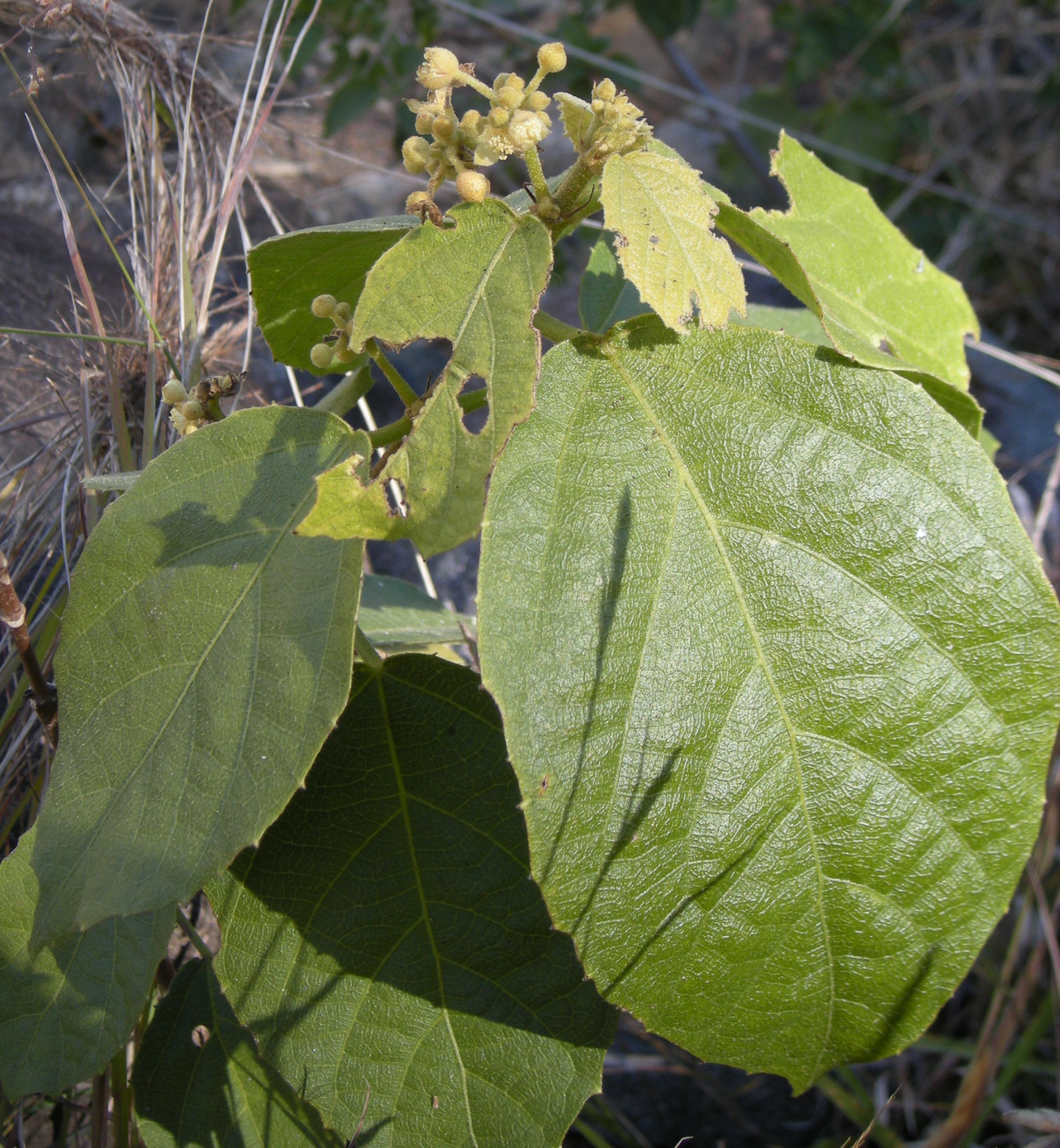

Scientific classification
- Kingdom: Plantae
- Clade: Tracheophytes
- Clade: Angiosperms
- Clade: Eudicots
- Clade: Rosids
- Order: Malvales
- Family: Malvaceae
- Genus: Grewia
- Species: G. latifolia

Binomial name
- Grewia latifolia F.Muell. ex Benth.

Synonyms
- Grewia blattaefolia Corner; Grewia latifolia Mast. [Illegitimate]; Grewia latifolia f. parvifolia Domin; Grewia richardiana Hook.; Microcos blattifolia (Corner) Rao; Microcos latifolia Burret

= Grewia latifolia =

Species of flowering plant

Grewia latifolia is a small shrub that is endemic to Northern and Eastern Australia. Its fruits have a distinct similarity to dog testicles, giving rise to the common name of dogs balls. Other common names include emu berry and dysentery plant.

Growing to a height of 2m, the species is characterised by ovate leaves with serrated margins. The leaves are discolourous with green papery upper surfaces and pale green to yellow pubescent lower surfaces.

The species is deciduous, shedding leaves in response to dry conditions. Cream coloured flowers are produced year round. Fruits are woody capsules with four externally visible compartments covered with coarse hairs.
