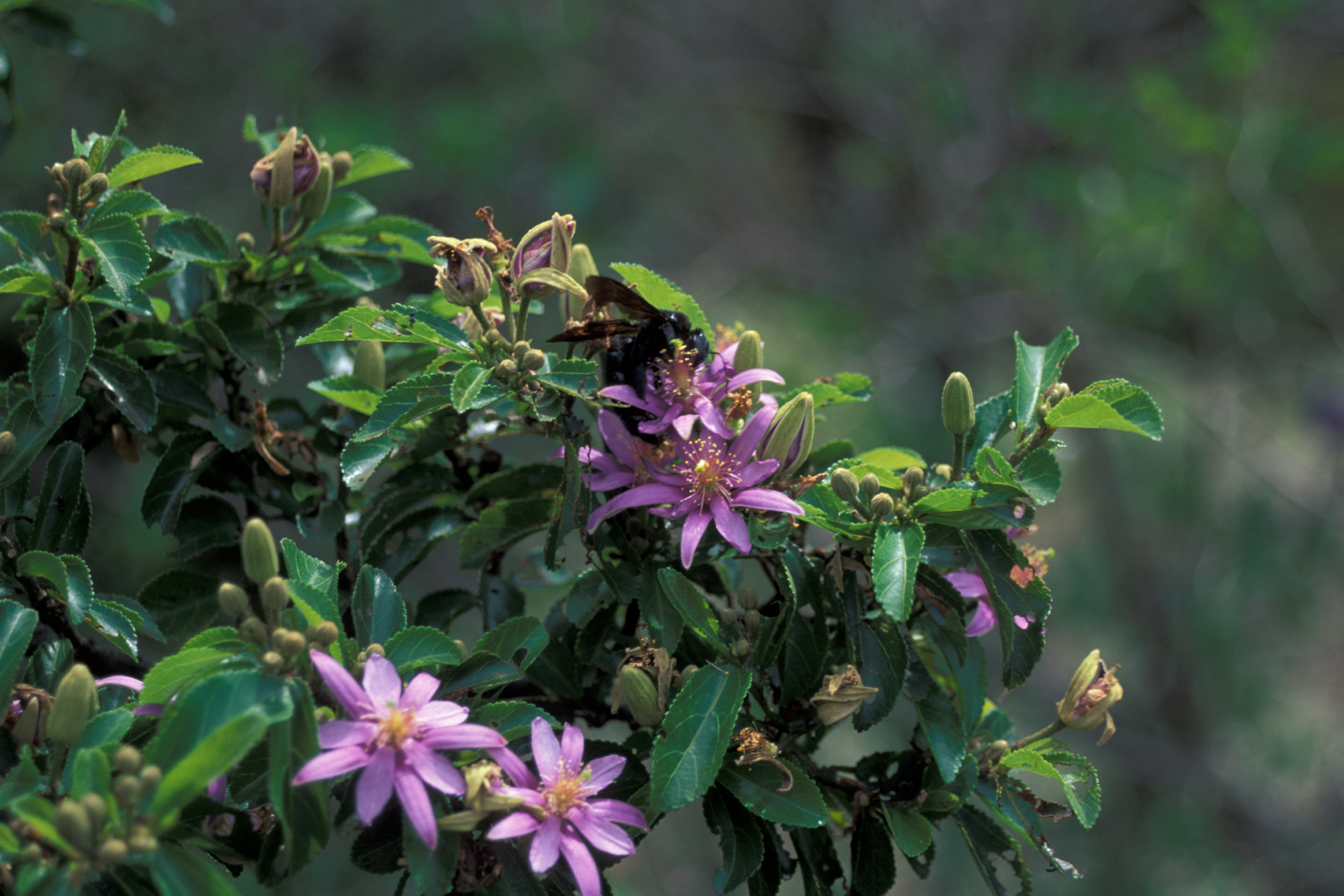

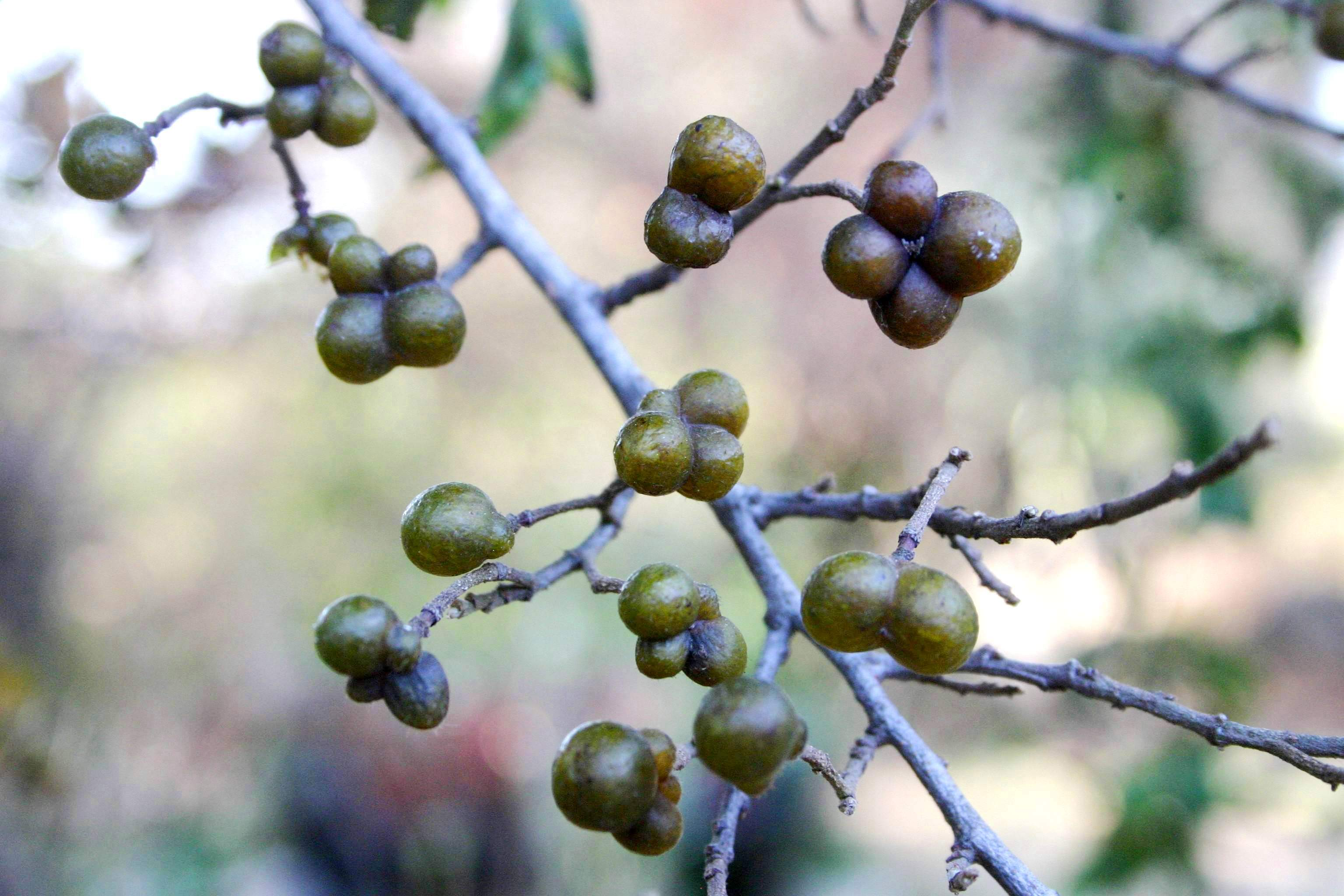
- Fruits

Conservation status
- Least Concern (IUCN 3.1)

Scientific classification
- Kingdom: Plantae
- Clade: Tracheophytes
- Clade: Angiosperms
- Clade: Eudicots
- Clade: Rosids
- Order: Malvales
- Family: Malvaceae
- Genus: Grewia
- Species: G. occidentalis

Binomial name
- Grewia occidentalis L.

Synonyms
- Grewia chirindae Baker f.; Grewia microphylla Weim.; Grewia obtusifolia Eckl. & Zeyh.; Grewia trinervis E.Mey.; Grewia ulmifolia Salisb.

= Grewia occidentalis =

Species of tree

Grewia occidentalis, the crossberry, is a species of deciduous tree, indigenous to Southern Africa.

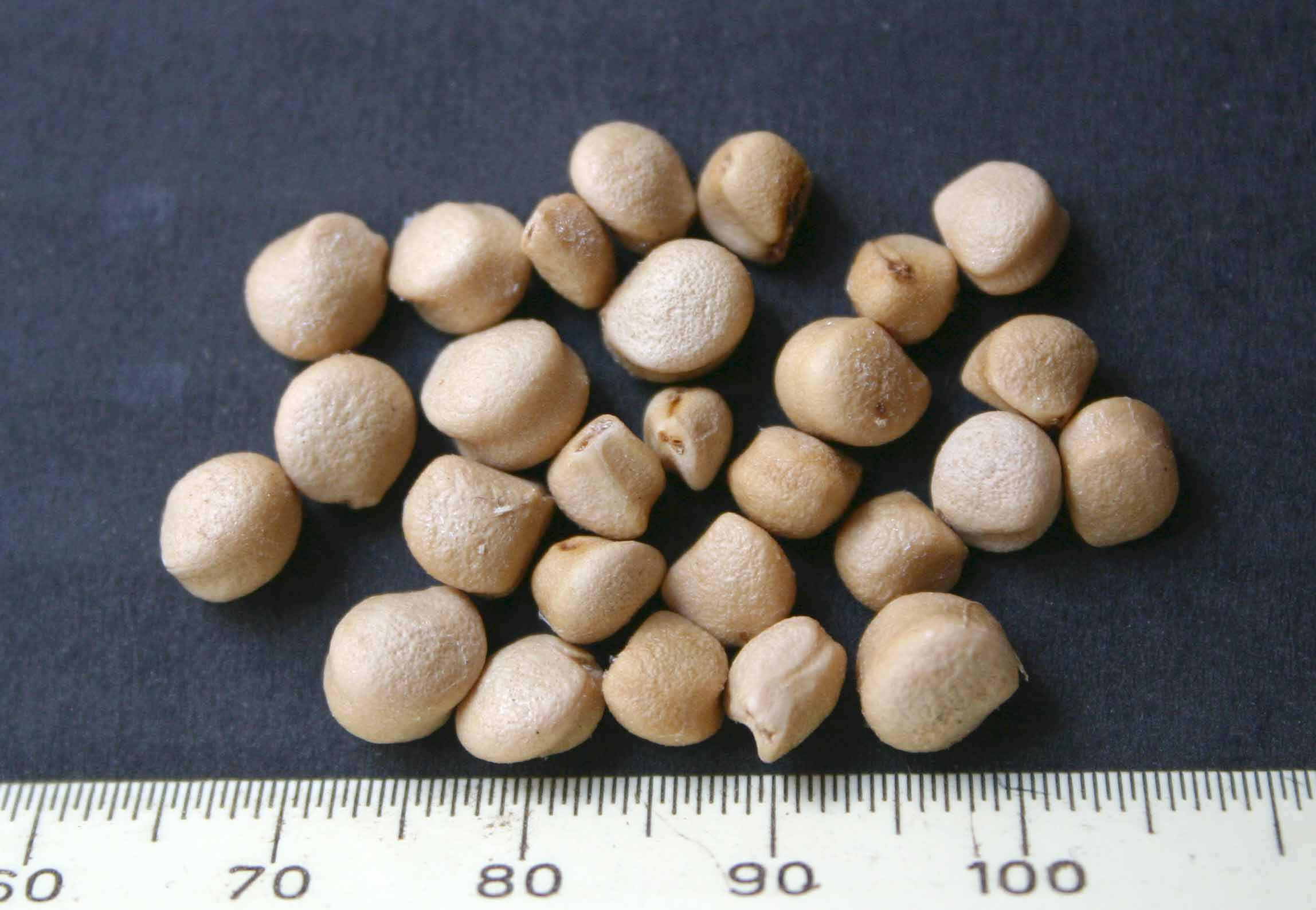
Seeds of Grewia occidentalis

== Description ==
A dense, attractive shrub or small tree with dark green leaves 3–10 m (10–33 ft) high, sometimes scrambling. The common names are "crossberry" and "four-corner." Its simple leaves are shiny, deep green and slightly fleshy, about 5–7 cm (2.0–2.8 in) long with small rounded teeth. The sepals and petals form unusual double star-shaped flowers, purple, mauve, pink or rarely white, 1.5–3 cm (0.6–1.2 in) across. Flower time is summer, followed by four-lobed fruits (drupes). These shiny reddish-brown berry-like fruits remain on the tree after maturity and attract fruit-eating birds.

== Distribution and habitat ==
Grewia occidentalis occurs naturally across south-eastern Africa, where its range extends from Cape Town along the coast to Mozambique and inland to Zimbabwe.

The native habitats of the plant are extremely varied, it is found in both the arid karoo of western South Africa and from the Highveld, and across the Afromontane forests of the Drakensberg range along the eastern coastline.

== Growing Grewia occidentalis ==
This decorative garden plant tolerates both light frost and drought. It also grows in both full sun or shade. The root system is not aggressive and can therefore be planted near buildings and paving, and it is very good at attracting butterflies and birds to the garden. The crossberry is best propagated from seed, although even then it can be erratic, as usually the seed needs to pass through the gut of a monkey before germination commences.

The berries are eaten locally, either fresh and raw, fermented with traditional beer, or used with goats milk to make berry yoghurt.
