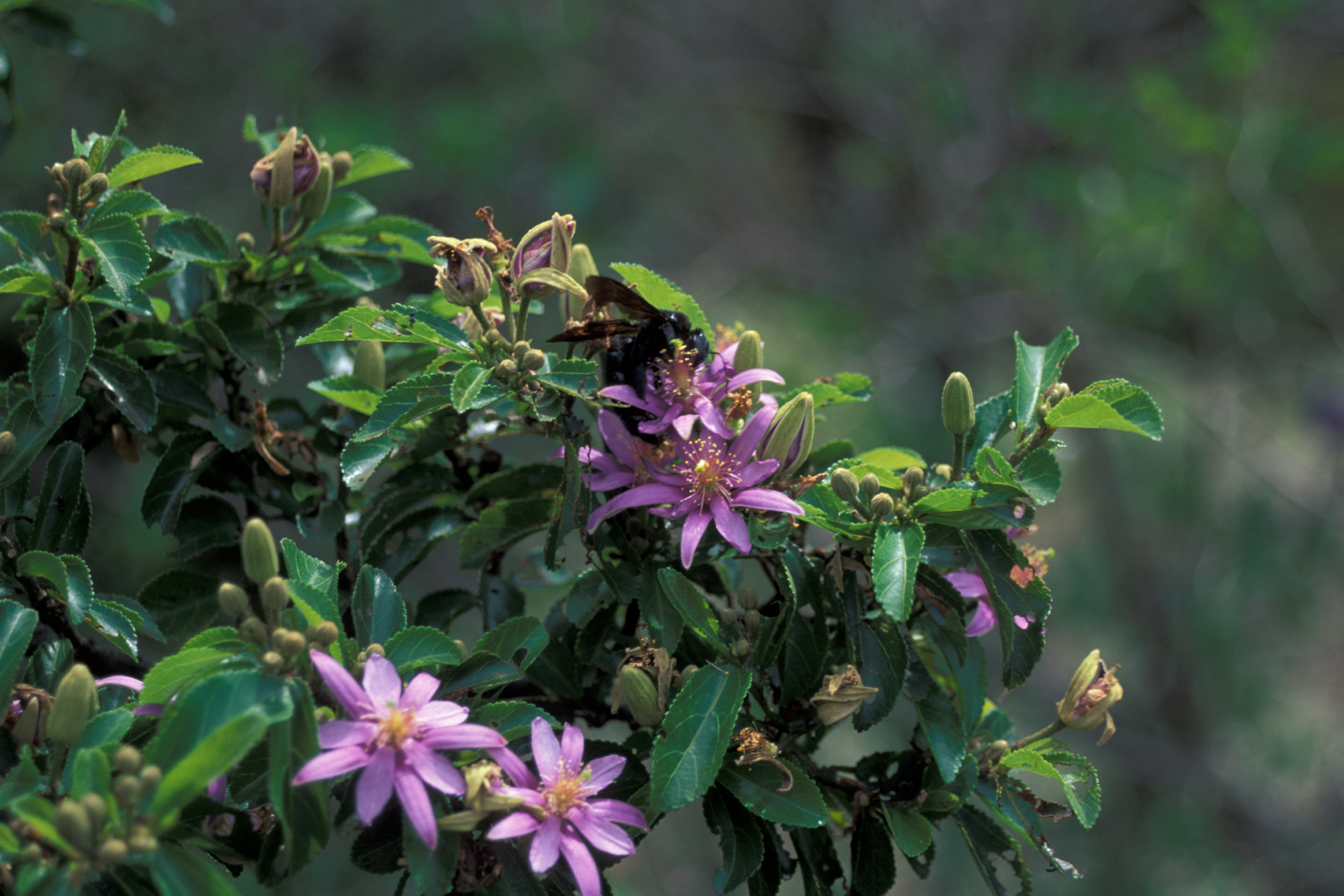
- Crossberry (Grewia occidentalis)

Scientific classification
- Kingdom: Plantae
- Clade: Tracheophytes
- Clade: Angiosperms
- Clade: Eudicots
- Clade: Rosids
- Order: Malvales
- Family: Malvaceae
- Subfamily: Grewioideae
- Genus: Grewia; L.

Species
- Numerous, see text or Complete list

Synonyms
- Arsis Lour.; Balmeda Steud.; Chadara Forsk.; Chadra T.Anders. (orth. var.); Charadra Scop. (orth. var.); Eleutherostylis Burret; Fallopia Lour. (non Adans.: preoccupied); Graevia Neck.; Greuia Stokes. (orth. var.); Grevia L. (orth. var.); Mallococca J.R.Forster & G.Forster; Tridermia Rafin.; Vincentia Bojer; Vinticena Steud.; Viticena Benth. (orth. var.)

= Grewia =

Genus of flowering plants

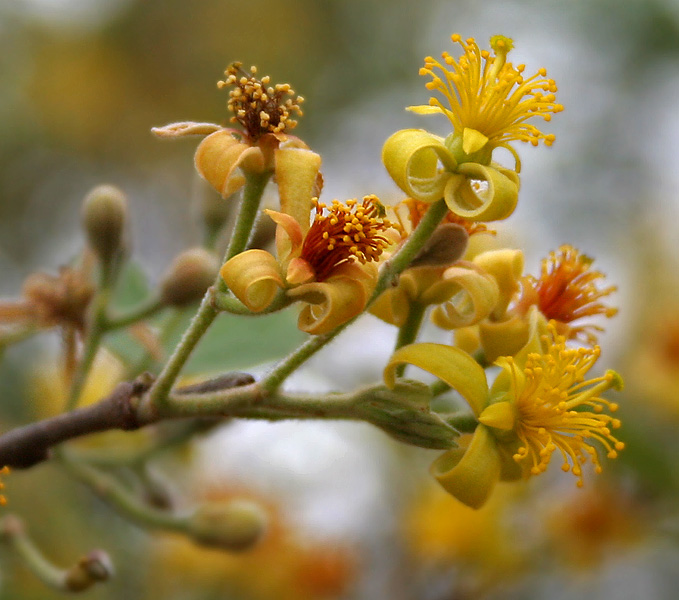
Grewia damine flowers in Hyderabad, India

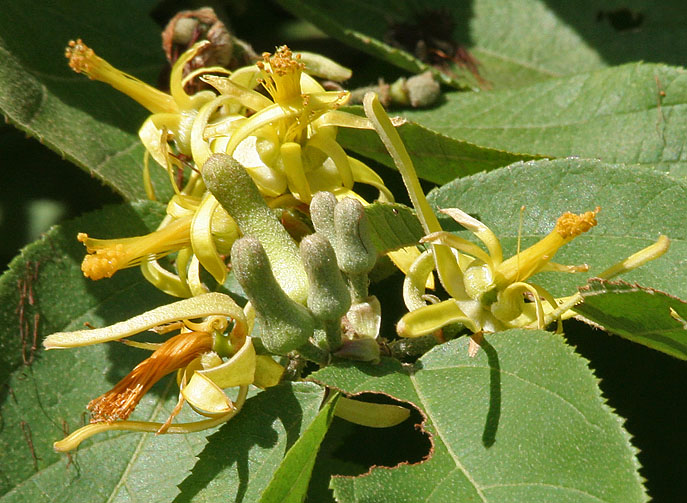
Grewia flavescens flowers in Hyderabad

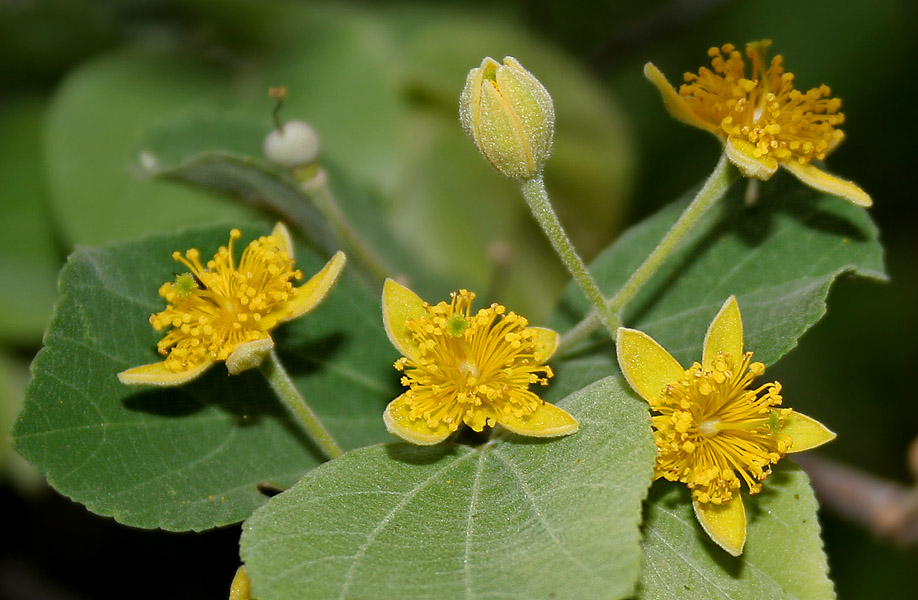
Grewia tiliaefolia flowers in Hyderabad

Grewia /ˈɡruːiə/ is a large flowering plant genus in the mallow family Malvaceae, in the expanded sense as proposed by the Angiosperm Phylogeny Group. Formerly, Grewia was placed in either the family Tiliaceae or the Sparrmanniaceae. However, these were both not monophyletic with respect to other Malvales - as already indicated by the uncertainties surrounding placement of Grewia and similar genera - and have thus been merged into the Malvaceae. Together with the bulk of the former Sparrmanniaceae, Grewia is in the subfamily Grewioideae and therein the tribe Grewieae, of which it is the type genus.

The genus was named by Carl Linnaeus, in honor of the botanist Nehemiah Grew (1641-1712) from England. Grew was one of the leading plant anatomists and microscope researchers of his time, and his study of pollen laid the groundwork for modern-day palynology.

== Ecology and uses ==
Several Lepidoptera caterpillars are found to feed on Grewia species. These include the common nawab (Polyura athamas) and the swift moth Endoclita malabaricus. The Bucculatricidae leaf miner Bucculatrix epibathra is apparently only found on G. tiliaefolia.

The parasitic wasp Aprostocetus psyllidis of the Eulophidae occurs on and around phalsa (G. asiatica). Its larvae are parasitoids of other insects - possibly pests of the plant, but this is not known for sure.

Several species, namely phalsa, are known for their edible fruit, which are of local commercial importance. The astringent and refreshing Grewia drupes are particularly popular in summertime. Folk medicine makes use of some species, which are reputed to cure upset stomachs and some skin and intestinal infections, and seem to have mild antibiotic properties. G. mollis is reputed to contain β-carboline alkaloids, though whether such compounds occur in other species too and whether they are produced in quantities to render the plants psychoactive has not been thoroughly studied.

In Myanmar, the bark of the tree of Grewia polygama (Burmese: တရော်) or Grewia eriocarpa (Burmese: ပင်တရော်) is mixed with the soapy kinpun (Senegalia rugata) fruit and sometimes lime to make the traditional shampoo tayaw kinpun, which remains widely used by the Burmese people and commonly sold in the country's open-air markets, typically in plastic bags.

Explorer Ludwig Leichhardt described preparing a refreshing drink from the seeds of native Australian species G. polygama.

== Selected species ==
275 species are accepted. Selected species include:

- Grewia abutifolia (= G. sclerophylla Roxb. ex G. Don, Sterculia tiliacea Leveille)
- Grewia afra Meisn. (= G. fruticetorum J.R.Drummond ex Baker f.)
- Grewia asiatica – phalsa, falsa
- Grewia avellana Hiern. (= G. calycina N.E.Br., G. hydrophila K.Schum., G. perennans K.Schum.)
- Grewia bicolor Juss. (= G. disticha Dinter & Burret, G. grisea, G. kwebensis N.E.Br., G. miniata Mast. ex Hiern., G. mossambicensis)
- Grewia biloba G.Don – bilobed Grewia (= G. biloba var. glabrescens (Benth.) Rehder, G. glabrescens Benth., G. parviflora var. glabrescens (Benth.) Rehder & E.H.Wilson)
  - Grewia biloba var. microphylla (Maxim) Hand.-Mazz. (= G. parviflora var. microphylla Maxim.)
  - Grewia biloba var. parviflora (Bunge) Hand.-Mazz. (= G. chanetii H.Lév., G. parviflora Bunge, G. parviflora var. velutina Pampanini)
- Grewia bilocularis Balf.f.
- Grewia calymmatosepala K.Schum.
- Grewia celtidifolia Juss. (= G. asiatica var. celtidifolia (Jussieu) L.F.Gagnepain, G. simaoensis Y.Y.Qian, G. yunnanensis H.T.Chang)
- Grewia crenata (J.R.Forst.) Schinz & Guillaumin (= G. malococca, G. persicaefolia, G. prunifolia, Mallococca crenata) – au‘ere (Cook Islands), fau ui (Samoa), fo ui (Tonga)
- Grewia cyclea Baill. – andilambarika (Malagasy)
- Grewia damine Gaertn. (= G. tiliifolia Vahl)
- Grewia eriocarpa Juss. (= G. boehmeriifolia Kanehira & Sasaki, G. elastica Royle, G. lantsangensis Hu)
- Grewia falcistipula K.Schum.
- Grewia flava DC. (= G. cana Sond., G. hermannioides Harv.)
- Grewia flavescens Juss. (= G. flavescens var. longipedunculata Burret)
- Grewia glabra Blume – sometimes included in G. multiflora
- Grewia glandulosa Vahl (= G. salicifolia Schinz)
- Grewia goetzeana K.Schum.
- Grewia hexamita Burret (= G. messinica Burtt Davy & Greenway, G. schweickerdtii Burret)
- Grewia hirsuta Vahl.
- Grewia hornbyi Wild
- Grewia inaequilatera Garcke
- Grewia insularis Ridl. (Christmas Island)
- Grewia lasiocarpa E.Mey. ex Harv.
- Grewia latifolia F.Muell. ex Benth.
- Grewia limae Wild
- Grewia microthyrsa K.Schum. ex Burret
- Grewia mollis Juss.
- Grewia monticola Sond. (= G. cordata N.E.Br., G. discolor, N.E.Br.)
- Grewia multiflora Juss. (= G. didyma Roxb. ex G.Don, G. disperma Rottler, G. guazumifolia Juss., G. jinghongensis Y.Y.Qian, G. oblongifolia Blume, G. serrulata DC.)
- Grewia occidentalis L. – Crossberry
- Grewia olukondae Schinz. (= G. flavescens var. olukondae (Schinz) Wild)
- Grewia optiva J.R.Drumm. ex Burret (= G. oppositifolia Buch.-Ham. ex D.Don)
- Grewia orientalis Carl Linnaeus
- Grewia oxyphylla Burret
- Grewia pachycalyx K.Schum.
- Grewia picta (= G. aldabrensis Baker
- Grewia renistipulata (Burret) Dorr
- Grewia retinervis Burret (= G. deserticola Ulbr.)
- Grewia retusifolia Kurz
- Grewia robusta Burch
- Grewia rothii DC
- Grewia savannicola ("Dogs balls")R.L.Barrett
- Grewia schinzii K.Schum. (= G. velutinissima Dunkley)
- Grewia similis K.Schum.
- Grewia stolzii Ulbr.
- Grewia sulcata Mast.
- Grewis tembensis Fresen.
- Grewia tenax (Forssk.) (= Chadara tenax Forssk., G. populifolia Vahl)
- Grewia tiliifolia Vahl (= G. rotunda C.Y.Wu, G. tiliaefolia (lapsus), Tilia rotunda C.Y.Wu & H.T.Chang)
- Grewia transzambesica Wild
- Grewia turbinata Balf.f.
- Grewia villosa Willd.

=== Formerly placed here ===
Some species once placed in Grewia (or genera synonymous with it) have since been moved elsewhere, particularly to Microcos:

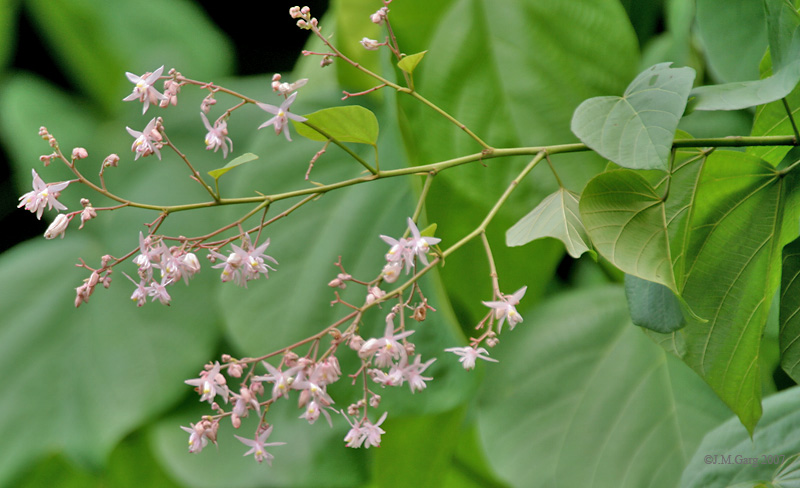
Kleinhovia hospita was formerly known as Grewia meyeniana

- Alangium salviifolium (as G. salviifolia L.f.)
- Dombeya boehmiana (as Vincentia boehmiana (F.Hoffm.) Burret)
- Kleinhovia hospita (as G. meyeniana)
- Microcos chungii (as G. chungii Merr.
- Microcos nervosa – possibly belongs in M. paniculata (as G. nervosa (Lour.) Panigrahi)
- Microcos paniculata (as G. microcos L. and possibly G. nervosa (Lour.) Panigrahi)
- Microcos triflora (as G. stylocarpa Warb. and G. stylocarpa var. longipetiolata Merr.)
- Trichospermum mexicanum (as G. mexicana DC.)
