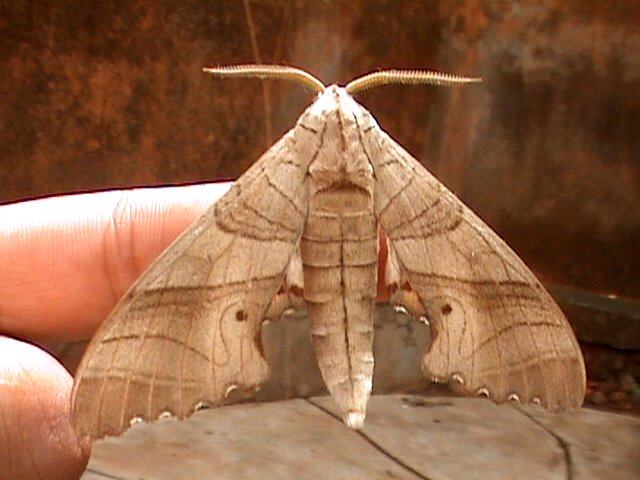

Scientific classification
- Domain: Eukaryota
- Kingdom: Animalia
- Phylum: Arthropoda
- Class: Insecta
- Order: Lepidoptera
- Family: Sphingidae
- Genus: Marumba
- Species: M. dyras

Binomial name
- Marumba dyras (Walker, 1856)

Synonyms
- Smerinthus dryas Walker, 1856; Marumba dryas Boisduval, 1875; Triptogon andamana Moore, 1877; Triptogon ceylanica Butler, 1875; Triptogon fuscescens Butler, 1875; Triptogon massuriensis Butler, 1875; Triptogon oriens Butler, 1875; Triptogon silhetensis Butler, 1875; Triptogon sinensis Butler, 1875; Smerinthus horsfieldi Moore, 1858; Smerinthus parallelis Moore, 1858; Marumba dyras ceylonica Kernbach, 1960; Marumba dyras handeliioides Mell, 1937; Marumba dyras plana Clark, 1923; Marumba dyras tonkinensis Clark, 1936; Marumba dyras digitata Dupont, 1941; Marumba dyras disjuncta Dupont, 1941; Marumba dyras sumatrana Gehlen, 1940; Triptogon dyras javanica Butler, 1875

= Marumba dyras =

Dull swirled hawkmoth

Species of moth

Marumba dyras, the dull swirled hawkmoth, is a species of hawk moth described by Francis Walker in 1856. It is found in South-east and South Asia.

== Description ==
The wingspan is 90–125 mm. The body is pale brown. There is a dark line running from the head to the end of the abdomen. Forewing is with a sub-basal line, three antemedial lines converging towards inner margin, two oblique slightly bent post-medial lines, the outer line is obsolescent. There is another post-medial line, curved from the costa to vein 2, then recurved upwards and inwards and enclosing a red-brown spot surrounded by an indistinct line. The two curved sub-marginal lines can be seen.

The hindwings are reddish brown with two red-brown spots on them. The ventral surface of the forewings with only lines on the outer half present. Ventral surface of hindwing with two post-medial straight lines and two sub-marginal curved lines.

The caterpillar is blue green with short white granular spines. There are lateral oblique streaks on the 5th to 10th somites. A black-ringed white eyespot can be found on the 4th somite. The horn is yellow. The pupa is dark red brown. The spiracles and cremaster are black.

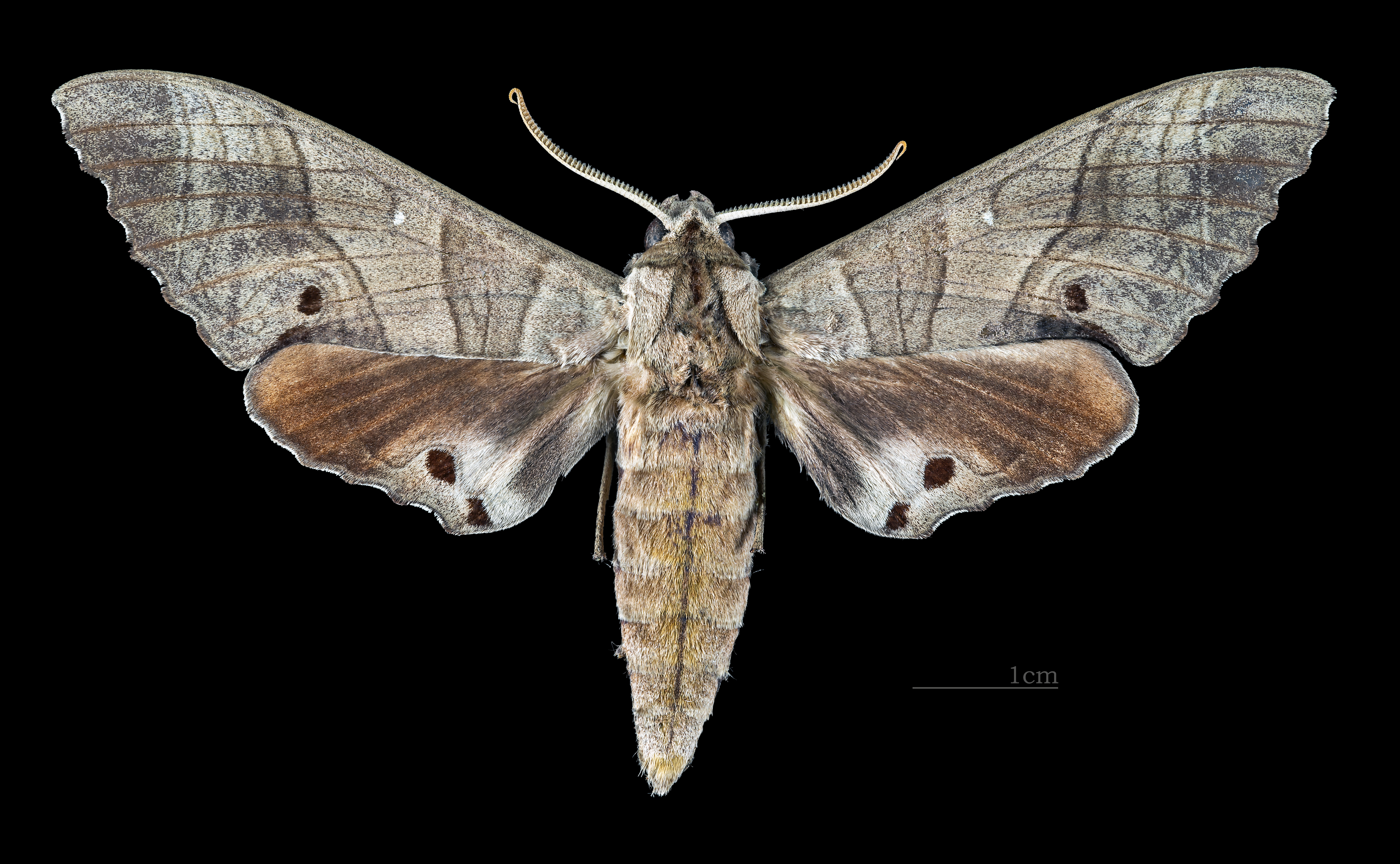
Marumba dyras dyras
male dorsal

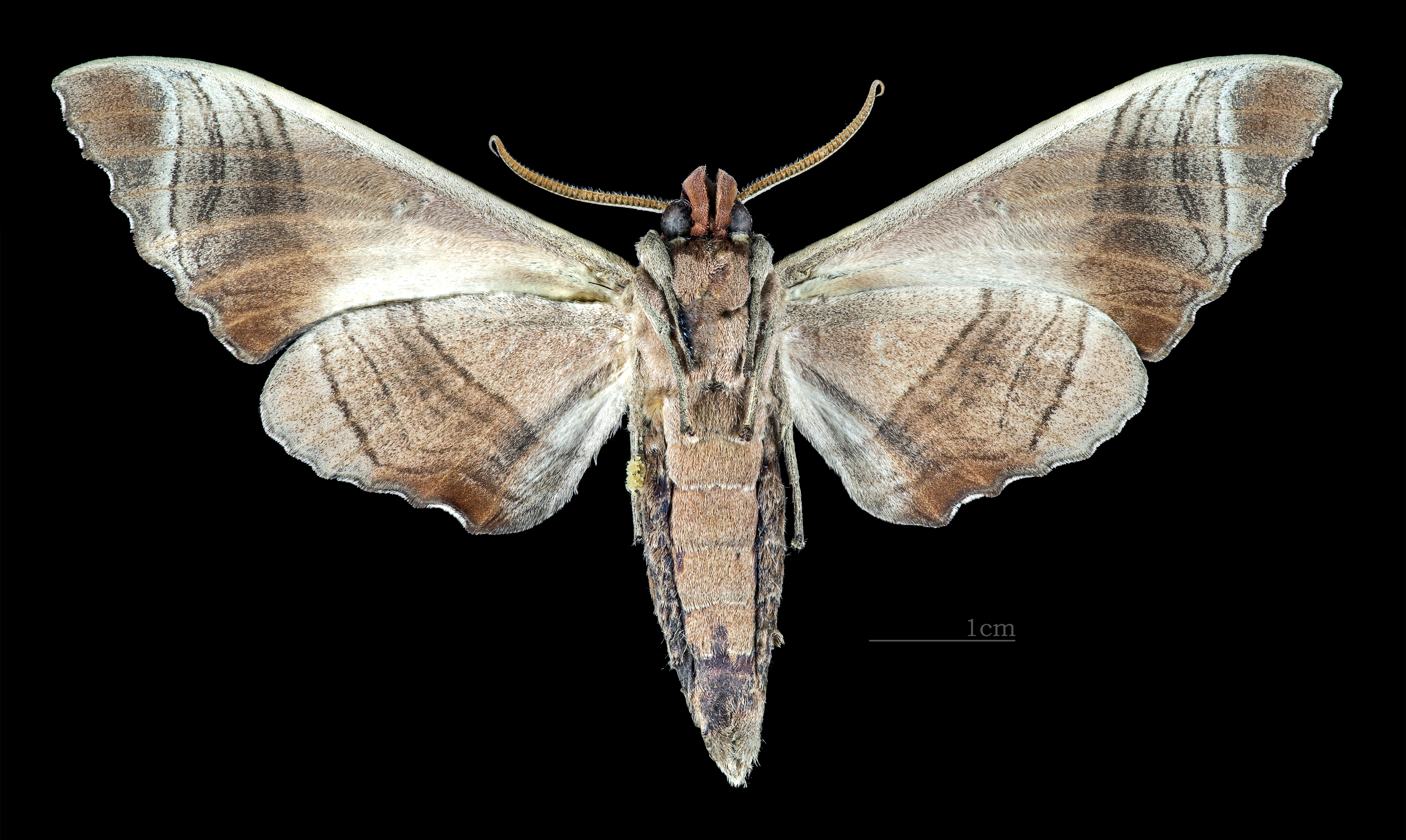
Marumba dyras dyras
male ventral

== Host plants ==
The larvae feed on various deciduous trees. They can be found in Byttneria aspera, Firmiana simplex, Microcos paniculata, Pterospermum heterophyllum, Sterculia lanceolata, Hibiscus mutabilis, Microcos paniculata. In India, M. d. dyras has been recorded on Bridelia, Sapindus and Schleichera. In Laos and Thailand, caterpillars recorded from Bombax anceps, Hibiscus rosa-sinensis and Microcos paniculata plants.

== Subspecies ==
- Marumba dyras dyras (from northwestern India and Sri Lanka, east through Nepal, Myanmar, the Andaman and Nicobar Islands, southern China, Thailand, Vietnam, Peninsular Malaysia and Taiwan)
- Marumba dyras javanica (Butler, 1875) (Java, Sumatra)
- Marumba dyras tenimberi Clark, 1935 (Tenimber Island)
