= Eight Protectors of The Twelve Zodiac =

Japanese guardian deities

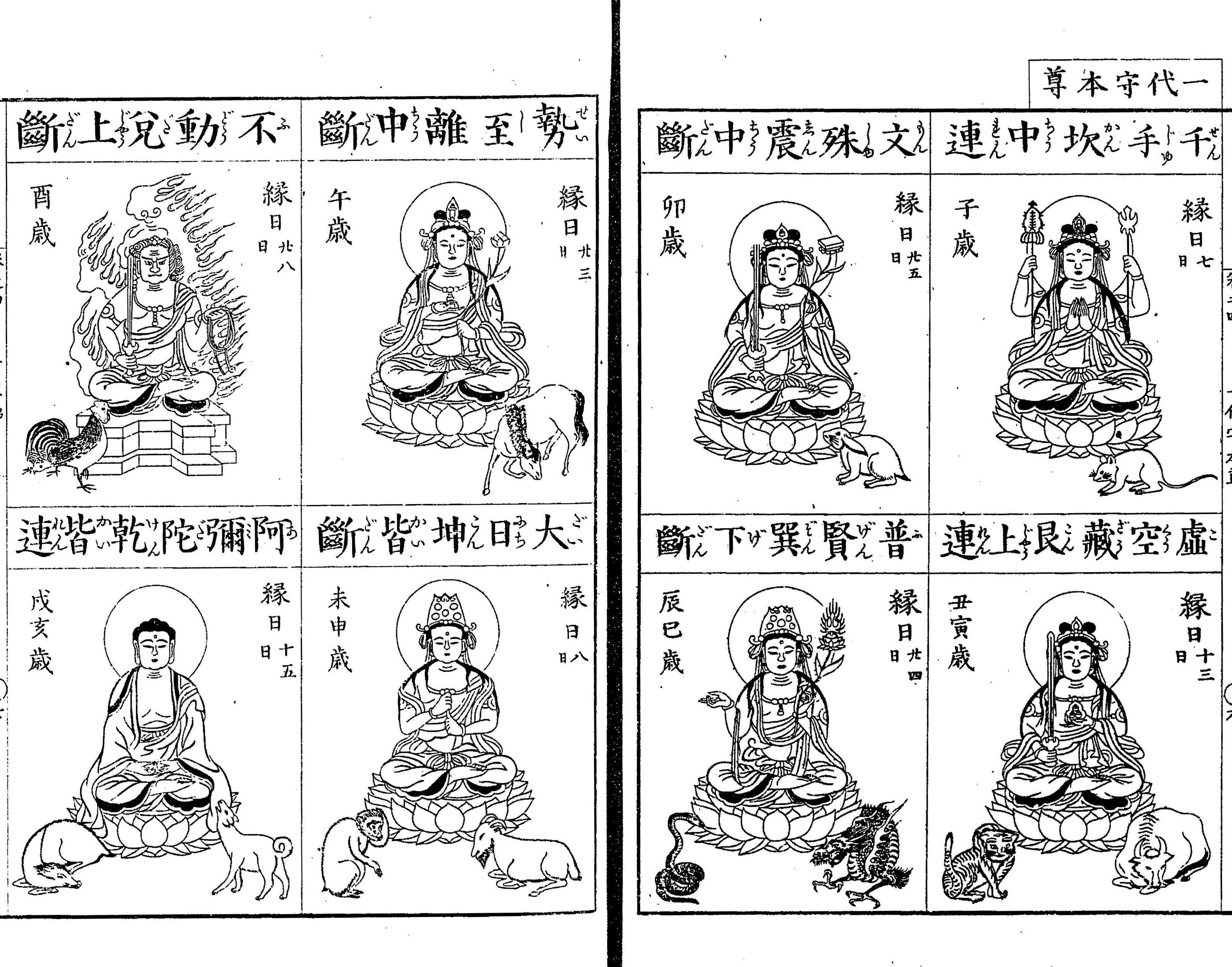
Eight Protectors of The Twelve Zodiac are listed in the fourth volume of Butsuzōzui. In the illustrations, the Thousand-armed Avalokiteśvara is simplified to have four-armed.

Eight Protectors of The Twelve Zodiac (Japanese: 十二支の御守り本尊), also known as The Eight Guardian Deities (Chinese: 八大守护神), Hachi-tai Futsu (Japanese: 八体仏), are guardian deities of the twelve zodiac animals in Japanese esoteric Buddhism, based on the Heavenly Stems, Earthly Branches, Twelve Nidānas and Godai. Although they are called guardian deities, they are actually Yidams. According to Japanese Buddhist customs, each person born in the year of their birth is guarded by the Buddha or Bodhisattva corresponding to their zodiac sign. For example, the guardian deity of those born in the Year of the Rabbit is Manjushri. Each guardian deity has a corresponding seed syllables, direction, and earthly branch.

The Eight Guardian Deities are not mentioned in any traditional Buddhist scriptures. Besides Japan, they are also widely circulated in China Mainland, Hong Kong, Taiwan, Korea and Chinese communities in Southeast Asia. Their images or seed syllables are often made into amulets, jewelry, thangkas, Thai amulets, and creative industries. The Eight Guardian Deities are also enshrined in the Buddha Tooth Relic Temple and Museum, Singapore.

== List ==
Images	Seed syllables	Yidams	Corresponding Chinese zodiac signs	Direction
	𑖮𑖿𑖨𑖱𑖾 / hrīḥ	Thousand-armed Avalokiteśvara	Rat	North
	𑖝𑖿𑖨𑖯𑖾 / trāḥ	Ākāśagarbha	Ox	Northeast
	𑖝𑖿𑖨𑖯𑖾 / trāḥ	Ākāśagarbha	Tiger	Northeast
	𑖦𑖼 / maṃ	Mañjuśrī	Rabbit	East
	𑖀𑖼 / aṃ	Samantabhadra	Dragon	Southeast
	𑖀𑖼 / aṃ	Samantabhadra	Snake	Southeast
	𑖭𑖾 / saḥ	Mahāsthāmaprāpta	Horse	South
	𑖪𑖼 / vaṃ	Vairocana	Goat	Southwest
	𑖪𑖼 / vaṃ	Vairocana	Monkey	Southwest
	𑖮𑖯𑖼 / hāṃ	Acalanātha	Rooster	West
	𑖮𑖿𑖨𑖱𑖾 / hrīḥ	Amitābha	Dog	Northwest
	𑖮𑖿𑖨𑖱𑖾 / hrīḥ	Amitābha	Pig	Northwest

== Gallery ==
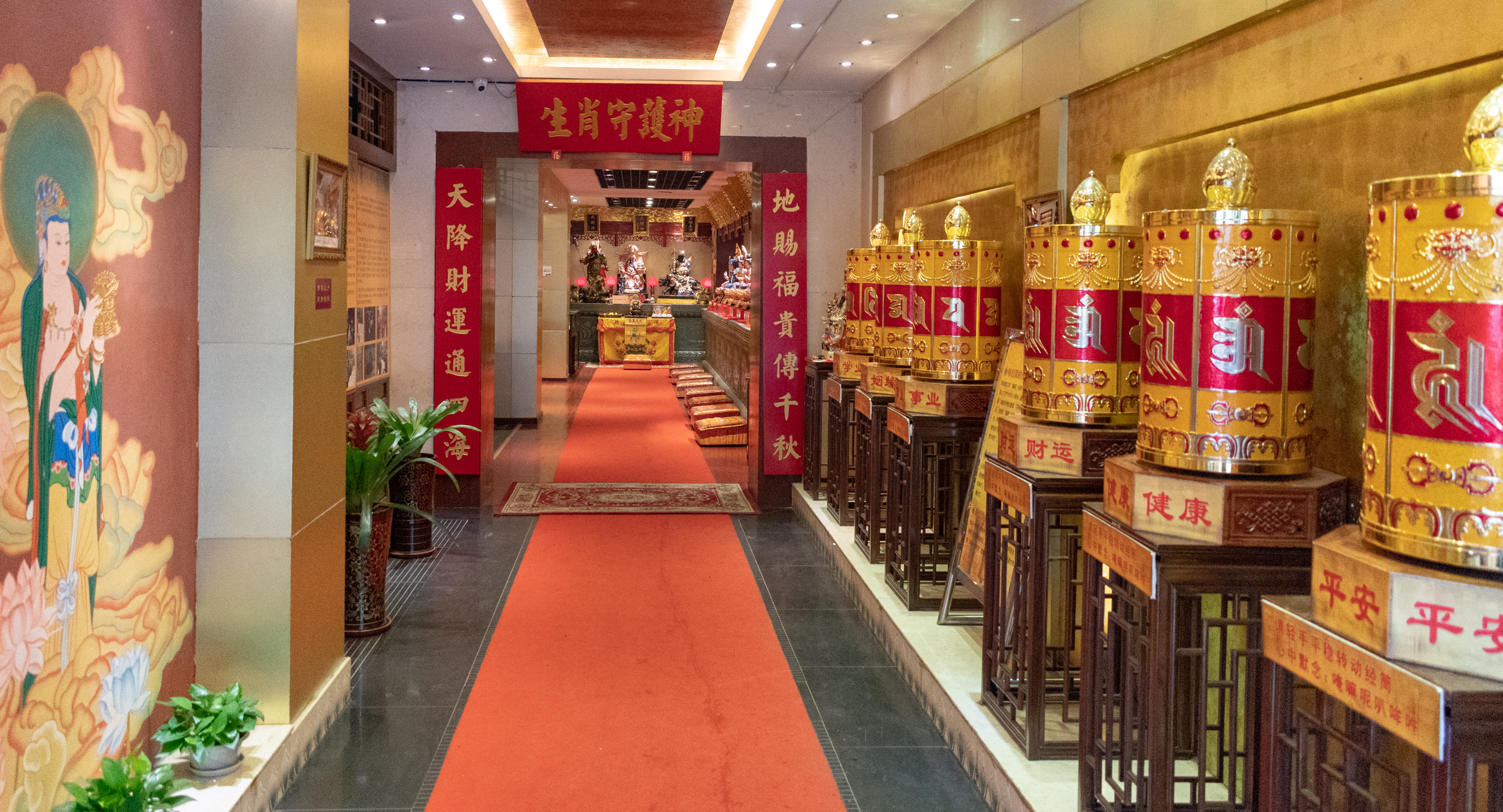
The Hall in Luohan Temple, Chongqing

== See also ==
- Twelve Heavenly Generals
- Chinese zodiac
- Colors of the day in Thailand
- Twelve Flower Fairies
