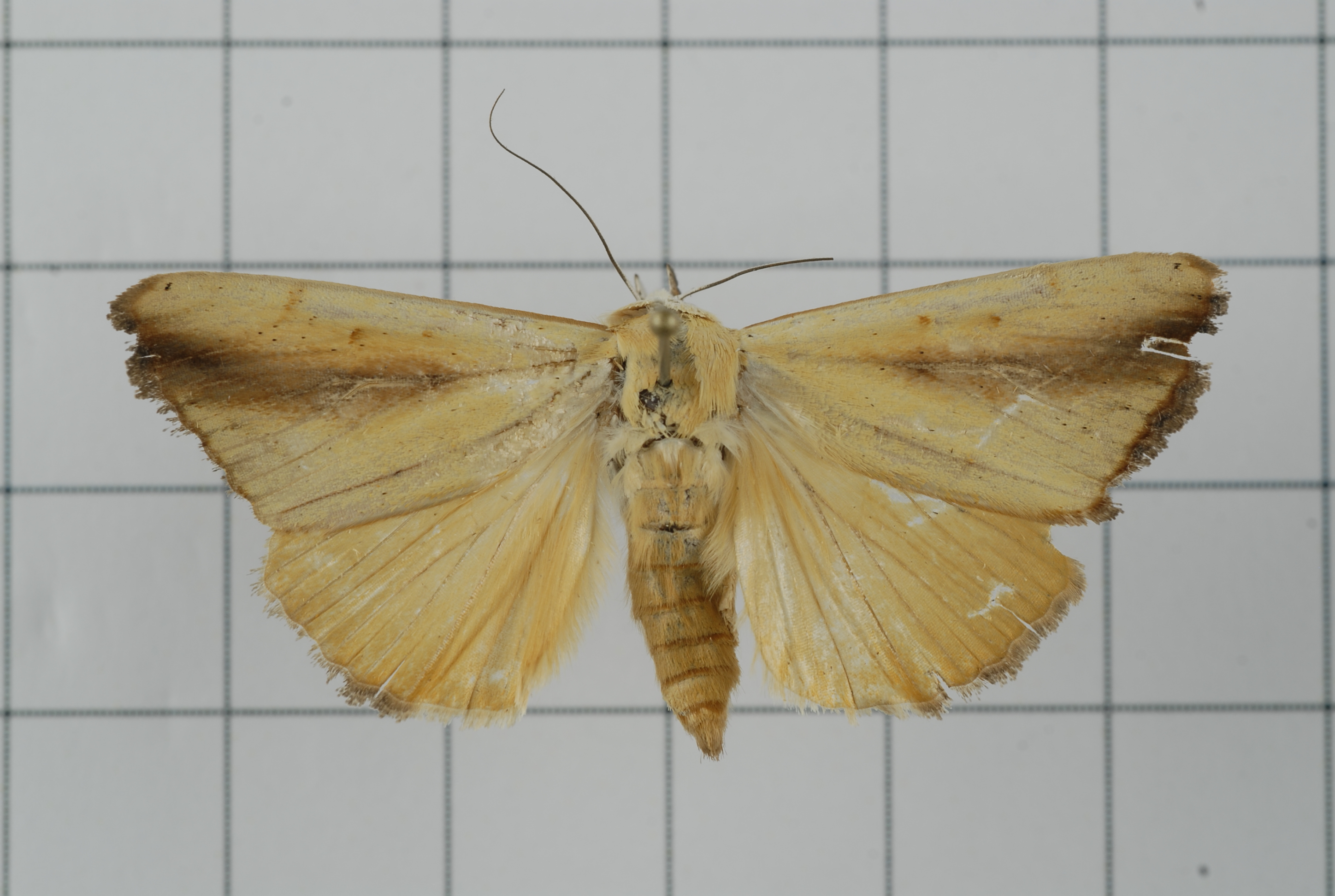

Scientific classification
- Kingdom: Animalia
- Phylum: Arthropoda
- Class: Insecta
- Order: Lepidoptera
- Superfamily: Noctuoidea
- Family: Nolidae
- Genus: Xanthodes
- Species: X. intersepta

Binomial name
- Xanthodes intersepta Guenée, 1852

= Xanthodes intersepta =

Species of moth

Xanthodes intersepta is a moth of the family Nolidae first described by Achille Guenée in 1852. It is found in India, Sri Lanka, Myanmar, China, Hong Kong, Japan, the Ryukyu Islands, the Philippines, Indonesia and Java.

== Description ==
It is similar to its sympatric species Xanthodes transversa but it differs in having the pure white palpi. The vertex of the head is whitish. Thorax and abdomen bright yellow. Legs reddish brown. Tibia covered with long hairs. Forewings bright yellow. Transverse black lines are reduced to a series of specks. Antemedial series curved. A large bright rufous triangular patch runs from just below the apex. Cilia rufous. Hindwings reddish-brown suffusion with rufous outer margin.

Its larval host plant is Abelmoschus esculentus.
