= Microcos erythrocarpa =

Conservation status
- Vulnerable (IUCN 2.3)

Scientific classification
- Kingdom: Plantae
- Clade: Tracheophytes
- Clade: Angiosperms
- Clade: Eudicots
- Clade: Rosids
- Order: Malvales
- Family: Malvaceae
- Genus: Microcos
- Species: M. erythrocarpa

Binomial name
- Microcos erythrocarpa (Ridley) Airy Shaw

Species of tree

Microcos erythrocarpa is a species of flowering plant in the family Malvaceae sensu lato or Tiliaceae or Sparrmanniaceae. It is a tree endemic to Peninsular Malaysia. It is threatened by habitat loss.
