= Microcos laurifolia =

Conservation status
- Least Concern (IUCN 3.1)

Scientific classification
- Kingdom: Plantae
- Clade: Tracheophytes
- Clade: Angiosperms
- Clade: Eudicots
- Clade: Rosids
- Order: Malvales
- Family: Malvaceae
- Genus: Microcos
- Species: M. laurifolia

Binomial name
- Microcos laurifolia (Hook.f. ex Mast.) Burret

Synonyms
- Homotypic Synonyms: Grewia laurifolia Hook.f. ex Mast.; Heterotypic Synonyms: Laurus smilacifolia Wall.

Species of tree

Microcos laurifolia is a species of flowering plant in the family Malvaceae. It is a tree native to Borneo, Peninsular Malaysia, Sumatra, Thailand, and Vietnam. It is threatened by habitat loss.
