= Floral color change =

Changes due to age or pollination

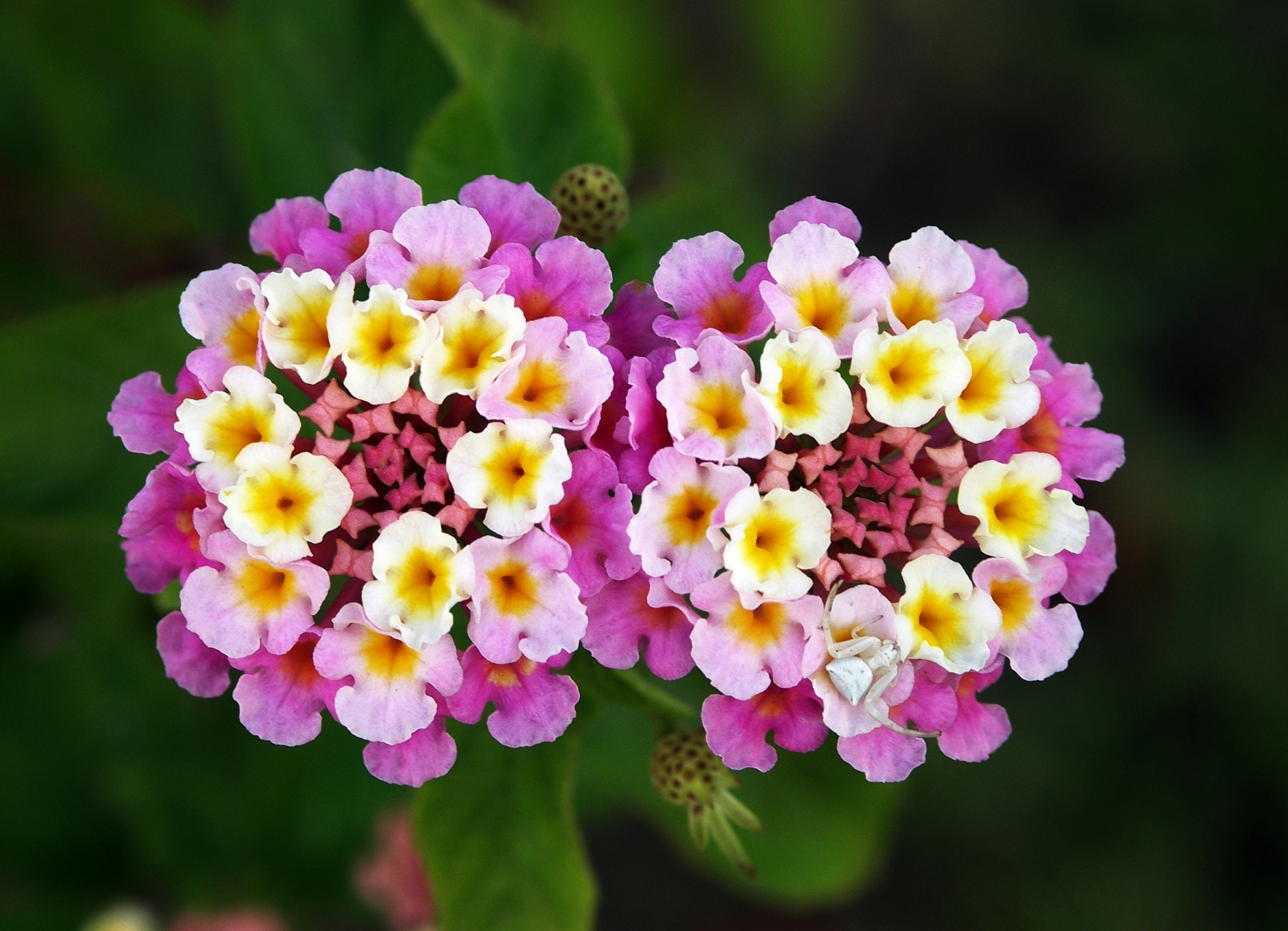
Lantana camara inflorescence displaying floral color change. The yellow and white flowers are newly opened while the magenta flowers are older and have been triggered by pollination to produce more anthocyanins.

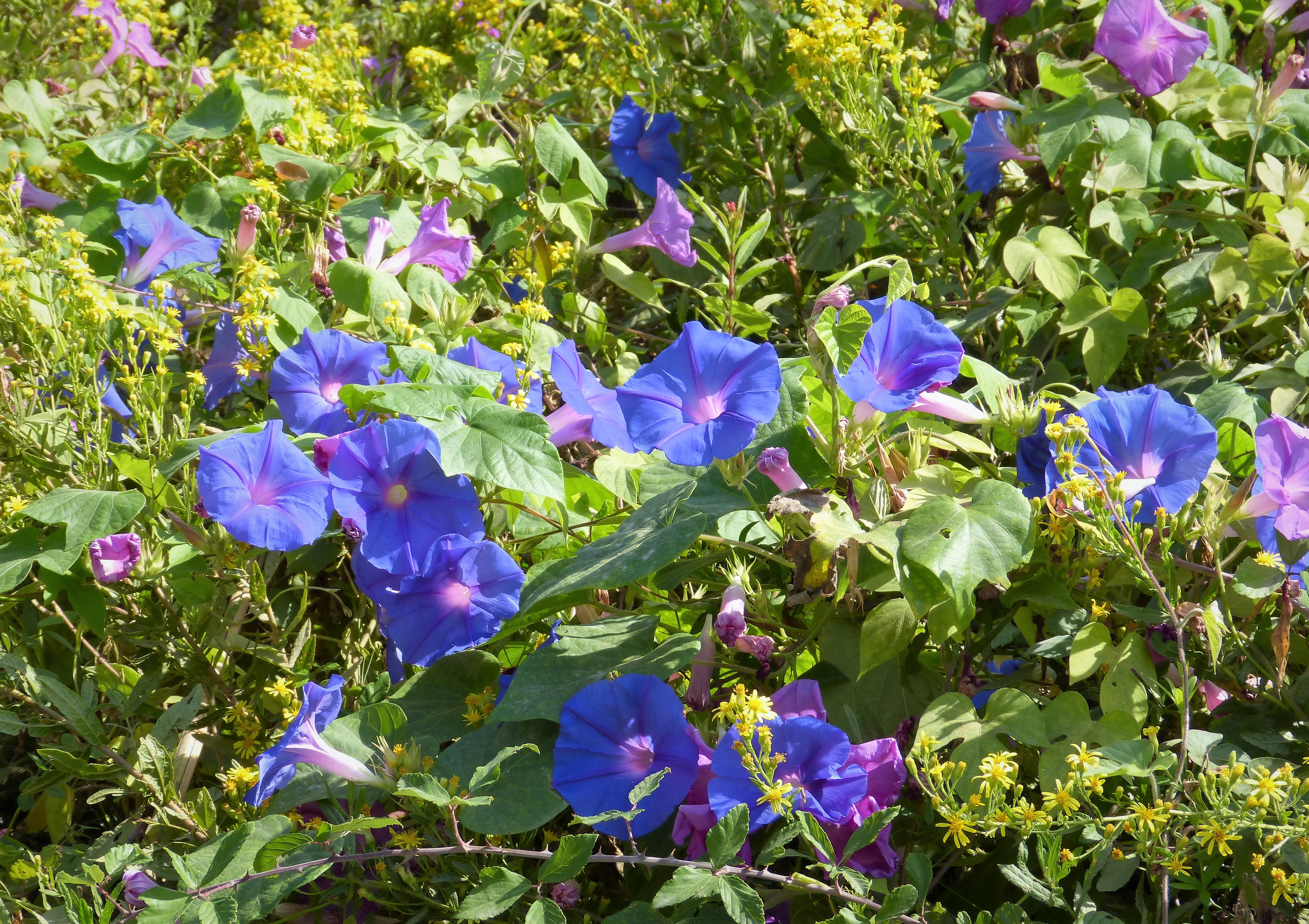
Ipomoea indica flowers change from bright blue to a faded purple by the end of the day.

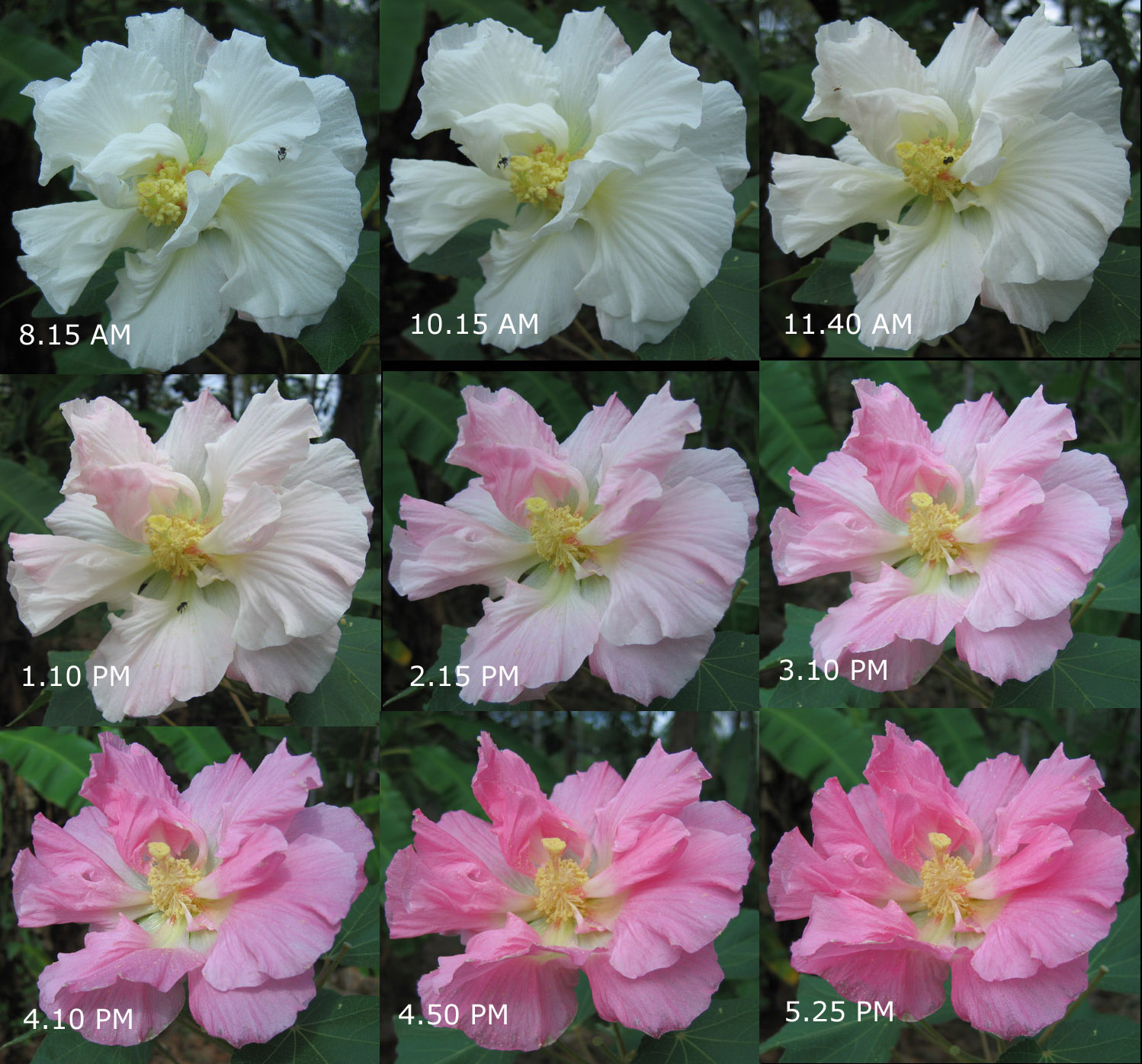
Hibiscus mutabilis flowers changing colors during a day

Floral color change occurs in flowers in a wide range of angiosperm taxa that undergo a color change associated with their age, or after successful pollination.

== History ==
The first written record of the term floral color change was in 1877 when Charles Darwin (12 February 1809 – 19 April 1882) forwarded a letter from his colleague, naturalist Fritz Müller (31 March 1821 – 21 May 1897) to the British multidisciplinary science journal, Nature. Müller documented the patterns and efficiency of pollination in relation to the floral color change that occurred in Lantana flowers found in Brazilian forests. It is now understood that floral color change has evolved independently several times and has maintained morphological and physiological differences across taxa.

Although this phenomenon was first mentioned over 200 years ago, research on its biological relevance has only occurred within the last few decades.

== Mechanisms ==
The three major pigments involved in floral color change are anthocyanins, carotenoids, and betalains. Color changes can occur from any of the following; an accumulation or loss of anthocyanins, accumulation or loss of carotenoids, or an accumulation of betalains. Floral color change may also be caused by an increase or decrease in pH causing a reddening/blueing of anthocyanins and co-pigments.

Floral color change can be inducible or non-inducible. Some flowers will change color at the same rate regardless of pollinator visitation, while others can be induced by pollen deposition on the stigma. However, inducible flowers will eventually change color due to senescence even without pollinator activity.

Depending on the species, floral color change can affect an entire flower or it can occur in localized parts. Previous research has found that moth-pollinated flowers are more likely to have whole flower color changes, while other insect-pollinated flowers are more likely to have localized color changes.

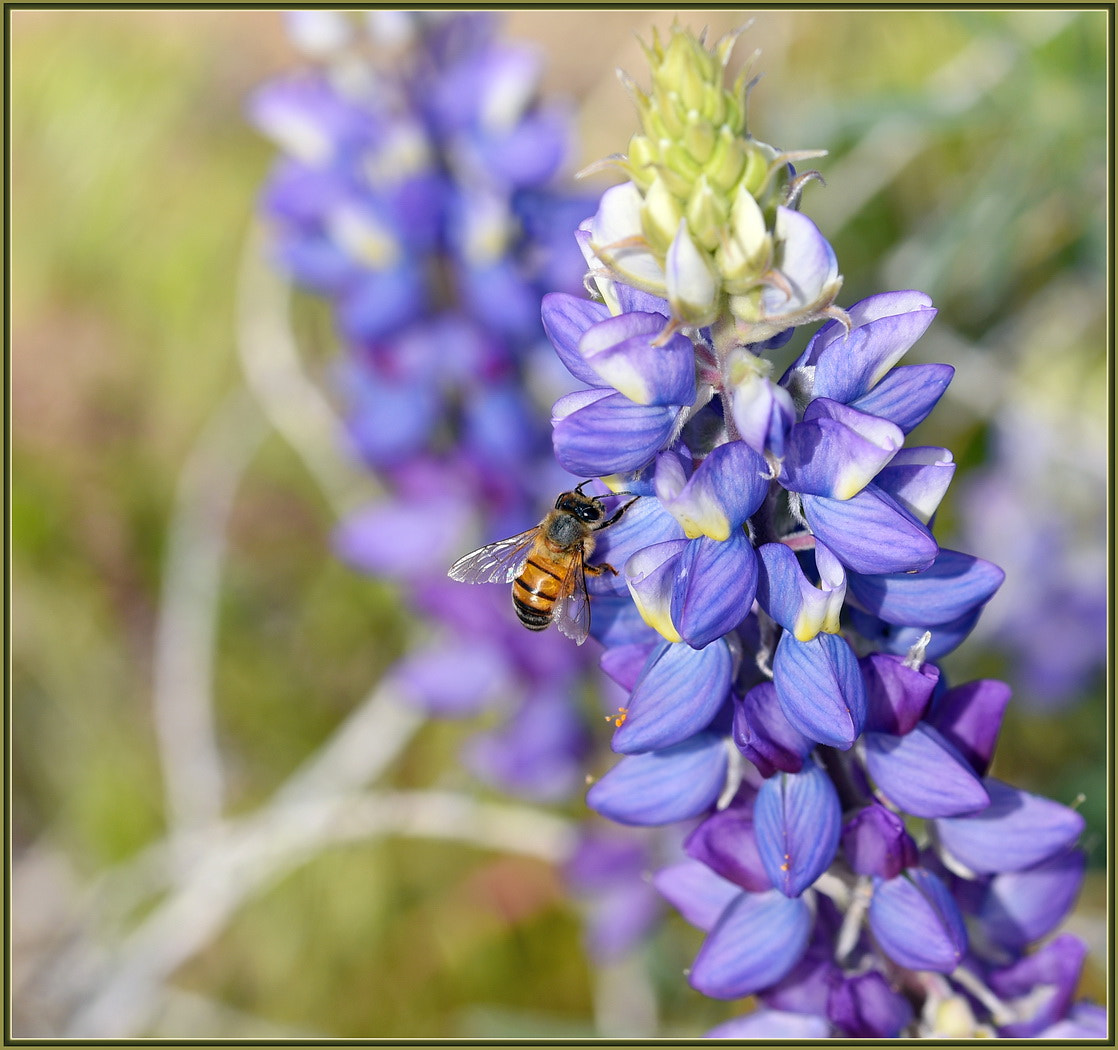
A foraging pollinator of a species in the Lupinus genus. At the top of the inflorescence are rewarding flowers at anthesis where the spot on the banner petal is yellow. Towards the bottom of the inflorescence there are older purple flowers that are typically avoided by pollinators presumably because they contain less pollen and nectar.

== Pollination ==
While flowers typically wilt after pollination, many angiosperm taxa maintain their flowers even after their sexual viability has come to an end. During this time flowers that have been successfully pollinated and have reduced rewards may undergo color changes, which act as a signal to their pollinators. Insect pollinators preferentially visit flowers that are sexually viable and have not undergone color change. Pollinators will learn and discriminate against floral stages from these signals benefiting both parties by allowing insects to be guided to flowers that are rewarding, while the flowers receive pollination.

It has been shown that the size of the plant's floral display is important in relation to plant-pollinator interactions. Larger floral displays are more likely to be seen and visited by their pollinators than small inconspicuous floral displays. Several angiosperm species are known to increase their floral display without producing additional flowers. These species accomplish this by retaining the older, nonfunctional flowers that would often be abscised in other species to reduce the cost to the plant that comes from the carbohydrates needed and the water loss that occurs when maintaining these tissues.

However, when these flowers are retained on insect-pollinated plants, there are the potential benefits of enhanced reproductive success through increased pollen deposition on stigmas and export of pollen to fertilize the ovules of other plants.

== Other forms of floral color change ==
Senescence is one of the main causes of floral color change along with induction by pollination. While angiosperm taxa show variation in the time that it takes senescence to occur, the mechanism is typically associated with the biosynthesis of anthocyanins. Evening primrose in the genus Oenothera are a common example of flowers that undergo color changes due to senescence. Oenothera will bloom in the evening and appear to be white or yellow, and by morning they fade to pink or orange.

Floral color change can also be a result of an increase or decrease in pH. Hydrangea is a model genus for this particular chemical change in flowers. Floral pigments in Hydrangea are affected by the presence of aluminum ions in the soil, causing changes in flower color from red, pink, blue, light purple, or dark purple.

There has been one non-chemical example found within Caesalpinioideae, a single sub-family of Fabaceae where the folding of petals cause changes to the color patterns of the flowers.

== See also ==
- Seasons
