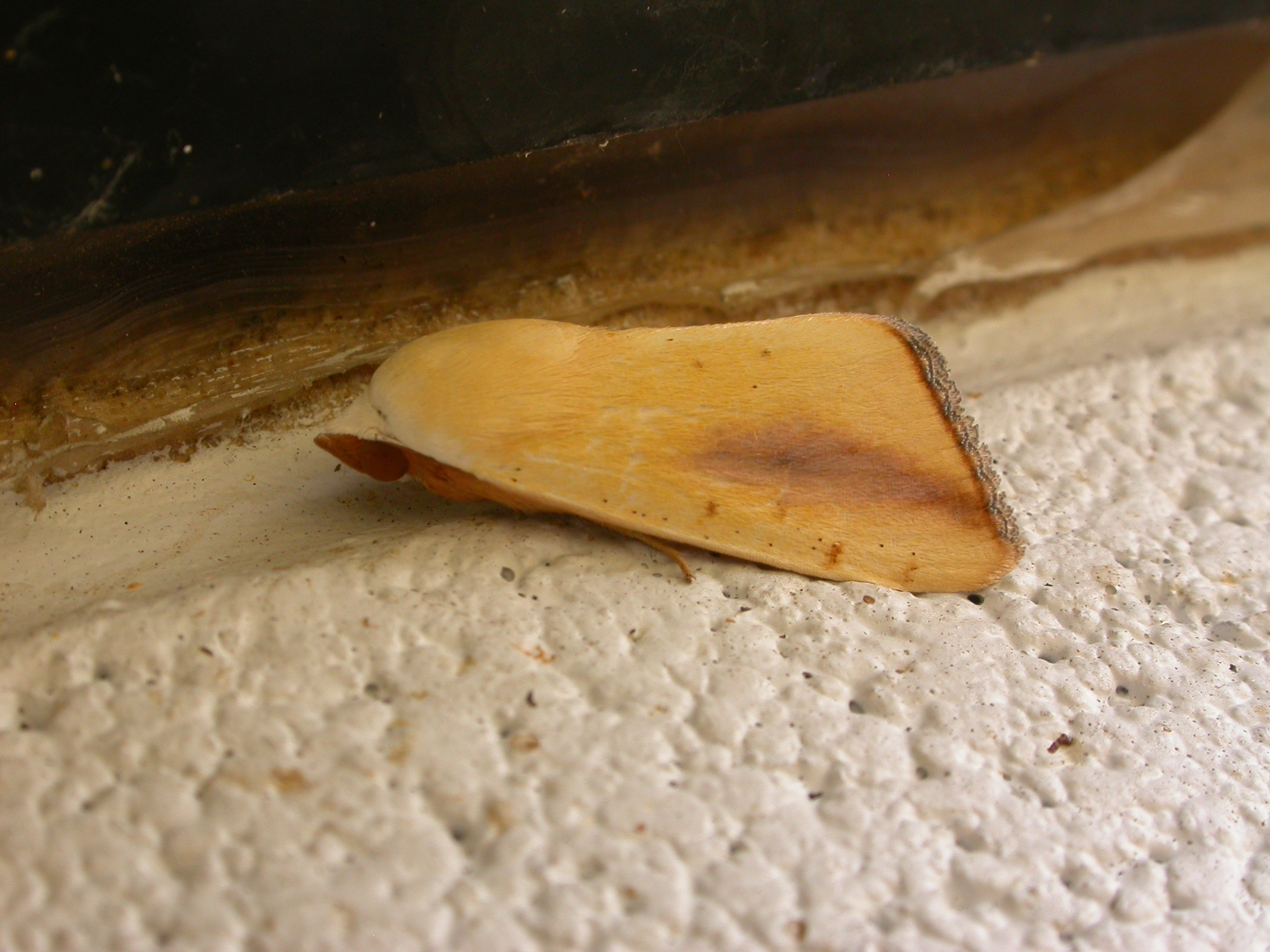

Scientific classification
- Kingdom: Animalia
- Phylum: Arthropoda
- Class: Insecta
- Order: Lepidoptera
- Superfamily: Noctuoidea
- Family: Nolidae
- Genus: Xanthodes
- Species: X. congenita

Binomial name
- Xanthodes congenita (Hampson, 1912)

Synonyms
- Acontia congenita Hampson, 1912; Acontia obsoleta Strand, 1917; Acontia obsoleta Gaede, 1938

= Xanthodes congenita =

Species of moth

Xanthodes congenita, the golden noctuid or as larva, the hairy leafeating caterpillar, is a moth of the family Noctuidae. The species was first described by George Hampson in 1912. It is found in Australia in New South Wales, the Northern Territory and Queensland.

The larvae feed on the leaves, buds, flowers and fruit of Gossypium, Nephelium lappaceum and Durio zibethinus. It is considered to be a minor pest on these species. They have also been reported on Hibiscus rosa-sinensis and Brachychiton.
