= Twelve Flower Fairies =

Fairies corresponding to seasonal flowers in Chinese folk religion

- Tutelary goddesses of flowers
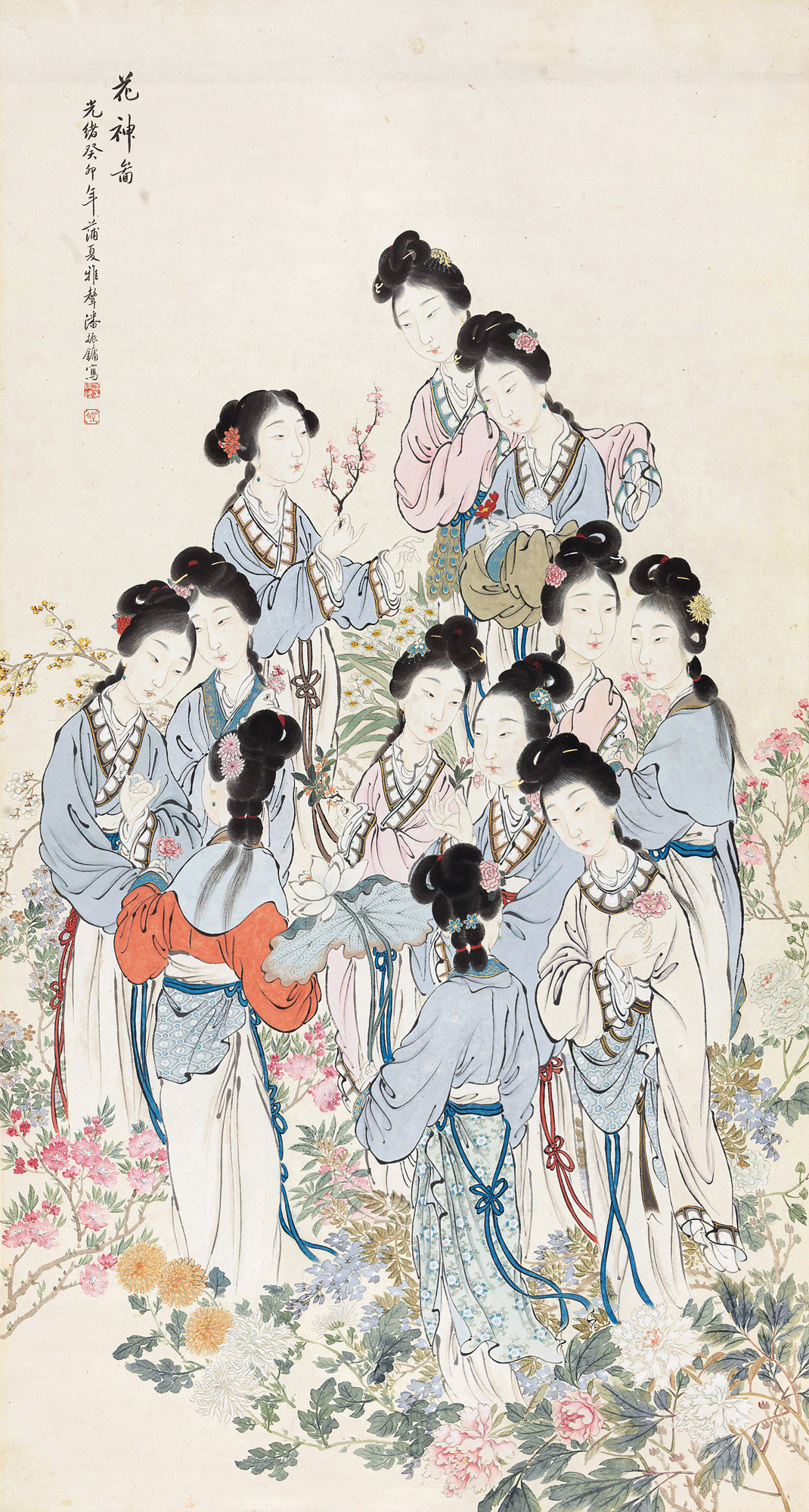
- The painting of Twelve Flower Fairies by Pan Zhenyong, 1903.
- Affiliation: Tutelary deity
- Region: Chinese folk religion
- Ethnic group: Han Chinese
- Festivals: Huazhao Festival

The Twelve Flower Fairies (Chinese: 十二花仙), also known as the Twelve Flower Goddesses (Chinese: 十二花神), is a collective term for fairies corresponding to 12 seasonal flowers in Chinese folk religion. They are depicted as 12 beautiful women dressed in traditional Chinese clothing. There are many different versions of the Twelve Flower Fairies, many of which feature female historical figures from the Tang dynasty and the Song dynasty as tutelary deities, such as Yang Guifei and Jiang Caipin.

The twelve flowers are: plum blossom as first month, apricot blossom as second month, peach blossom as third month, peony as fourth month, pomegranate blossom as fifth month, lotus as sixth month, hollyhock as seventh month (in some versions is hosta), osmanthus as eighth month, chrysanthemum as ninth month, cotton rose as tenth month, camellia as eleventh month, and daffodil as twelfth month.

With the rise of the Hanfu movement in recent years, especially during the Huazhao Festival, some Hanfu enthusiasts dress-up as the Twelve Flower Fairies.
