= Microcos crassifolia =

Scientific classification
- Kingdom: Plantae
- Clade: Tracheophytes
- Clade: Angiosperms
- Clade: Eudicots
- Clade: Rosids
- Order: Malvales
- Family: Malvaceae
- Genus: Microcos
- Species: M. crassifolia

Binomial name
- Microcos crassifolia Burret

Synonyms
- Grewia pyriformis Merr.

Species of flowering plant

Microcos crassifolia, also known locally as chanderai or bunsi, is a species of flowering plant, a fruit tree in the mallow family, that is endemic to Borneo.

== Description ==
The tree grows to no more than 10 m in height with a bole of less than 1.5 m. The smooth oval leaves are 10–30 cm long by 6–9 cm wide. The axillary or terminal inflorescences bear small white or cream flowers. The fruits are pear-shaped orange drupes, 2–2.5 cm by 1–1.5 cm in diameter, containing an 8 mm seed in an edible, juicy, fibrous orange mesocarp.

== Distribution and habitat ==
The species is endemic to Borneo where it is known from Sabah and Sarawak as an understorey tree of lowland riparian and swamp forests. It is rarely cultivated.
