= Li Di =

Chinese court painter (1100 - 1197)

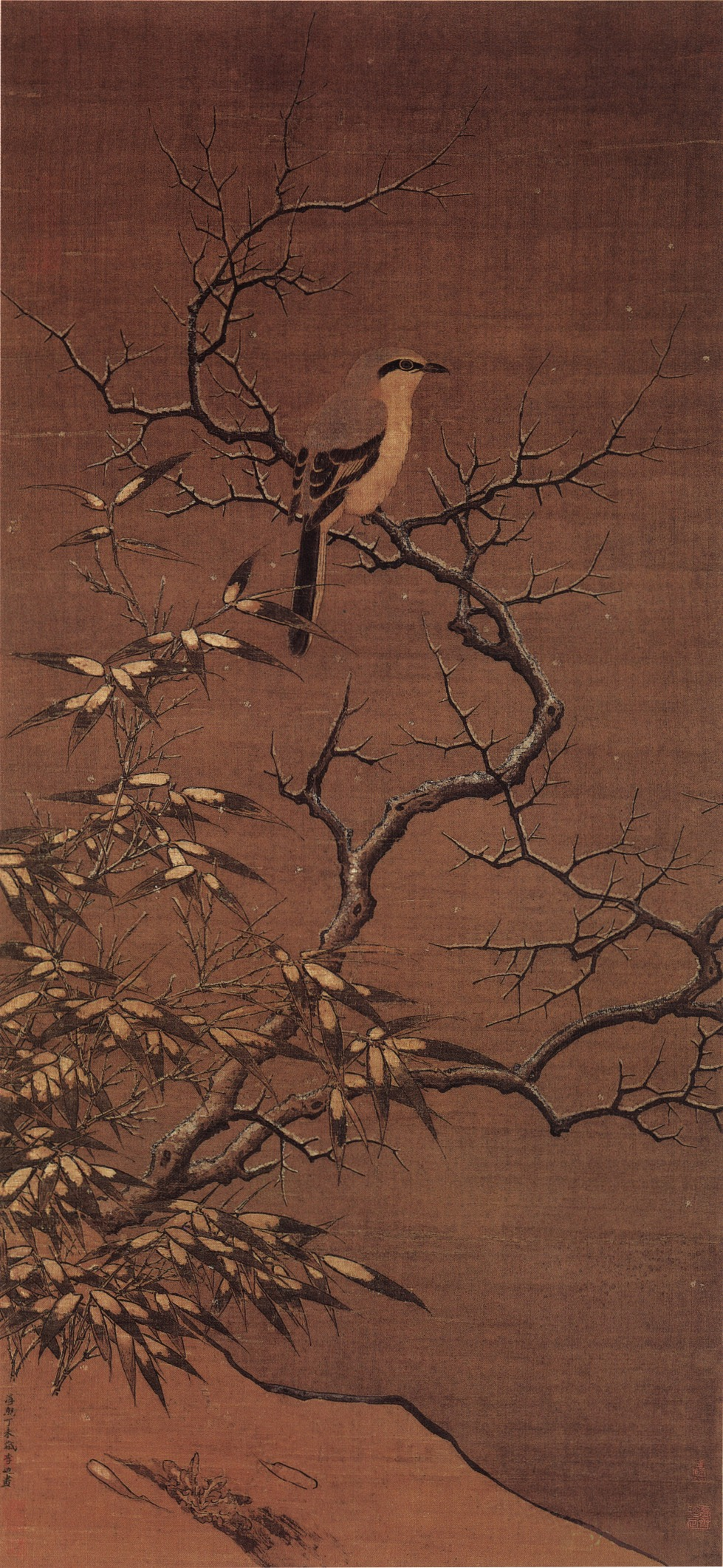
Shrike on a tree in winter. Song dynasty, 1187 AD. Currently kept at Shanghai Museum.

Li Di (Chinese: 李迪; pinyin: Lǐ Dí; Wade–Giles: Li Ti; c. 1100 – after 1197) was a Chinese imperial court painter during the Song dynasty. He was noted for painting flowers, birds, bamboo, and animals in motion. Li was a member of the Academy of Worthies.

== Biography ==
Li was born in Heyang (河陽), in modern Meng County (孟县) in Henan Province. He worked at the Imperial Painting Academy, and his career spanned the reigns of emperors Xiaozong, Guangzong, and Ningzong.

The exact dates of his life are uncertain, only that his first signed painting is dated 1125, and his last known painting is dated 1197.

== Family ==
Li Di's son, Li Demao, was also a painter in the Imperial Painting Academy.

== Gallery ==
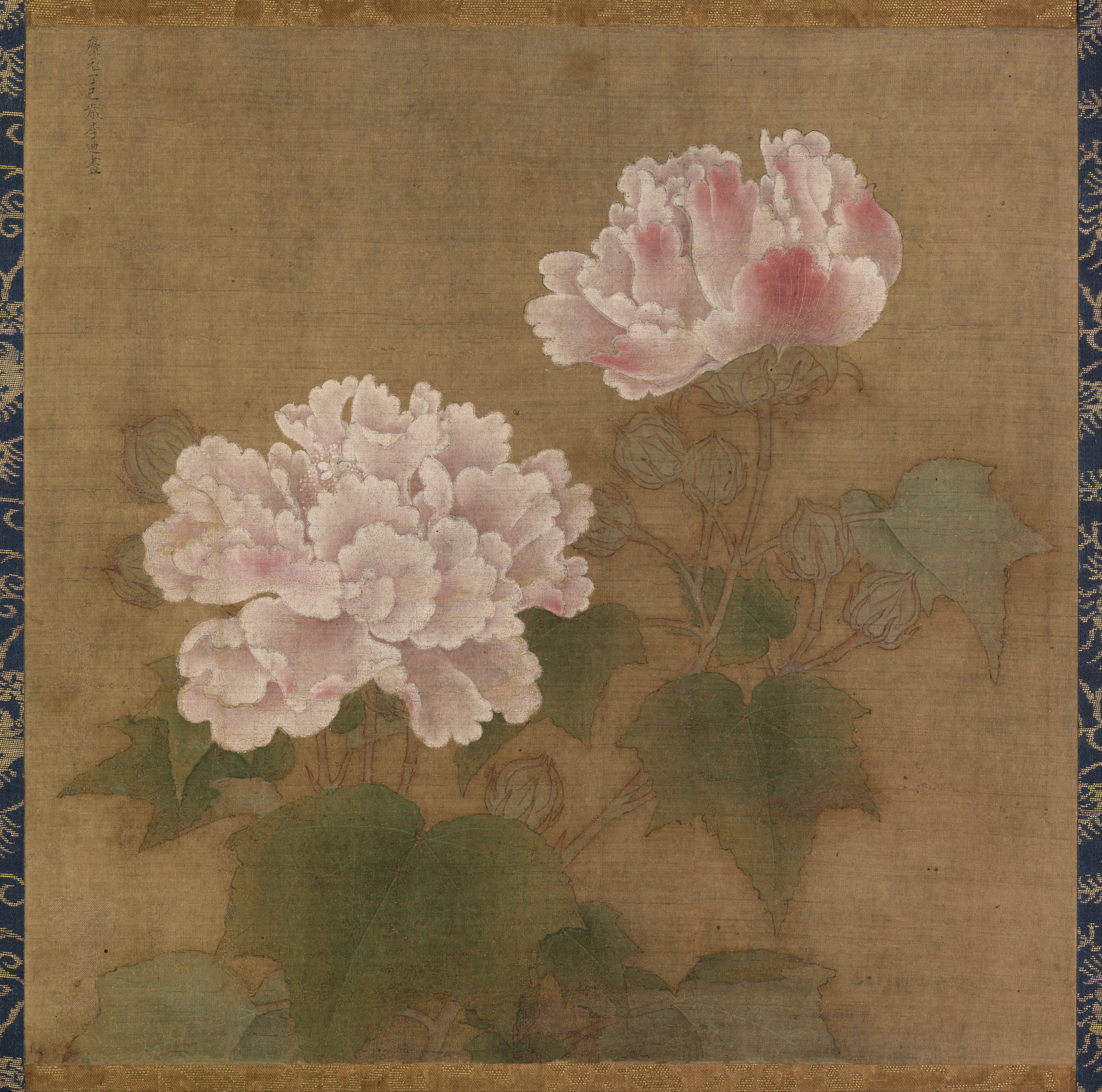
Red and White Cotton Roses (1197). Tokyo National Museum.

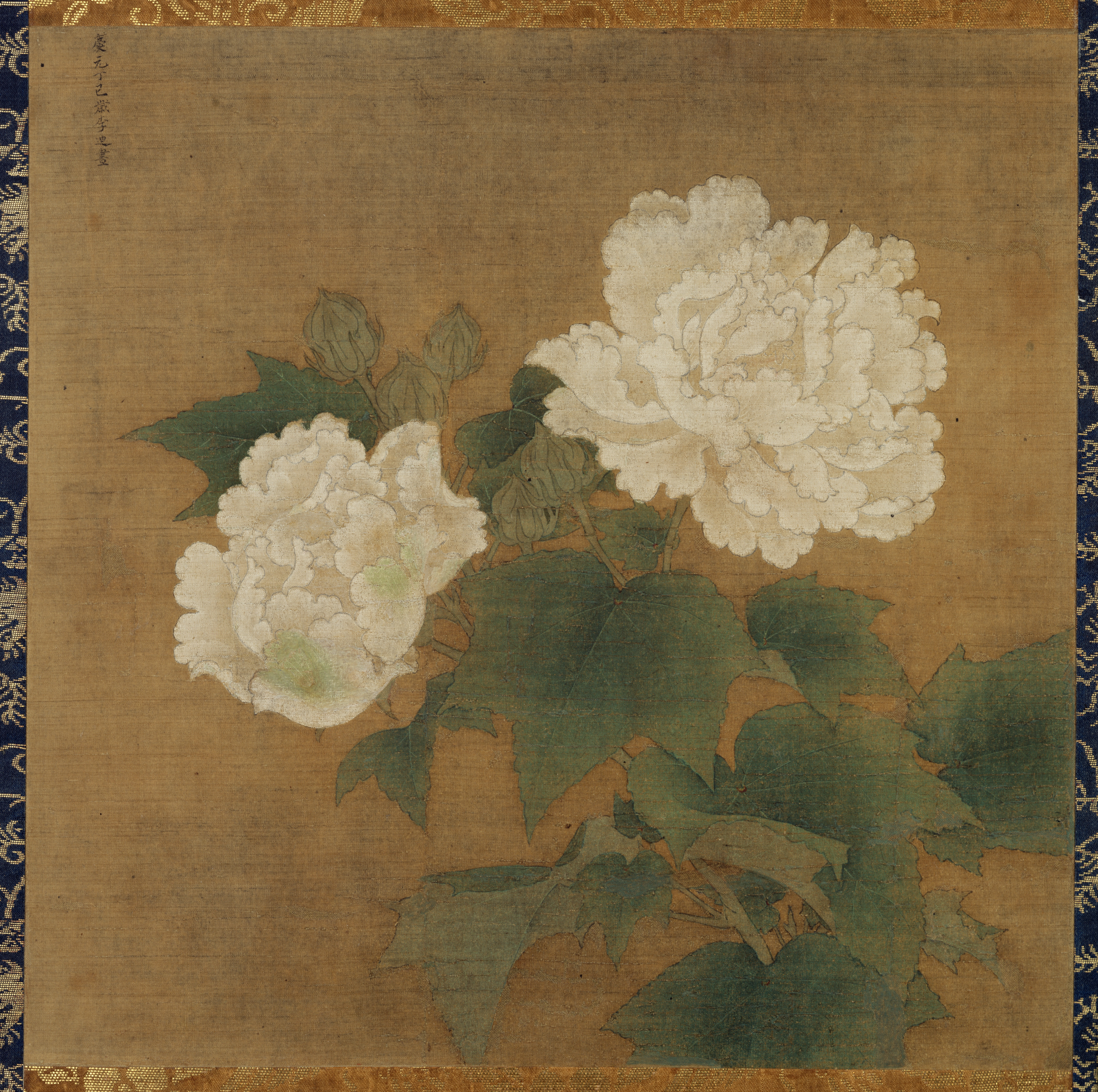
White Cotton Roses (1197). Tokyo National Museum.

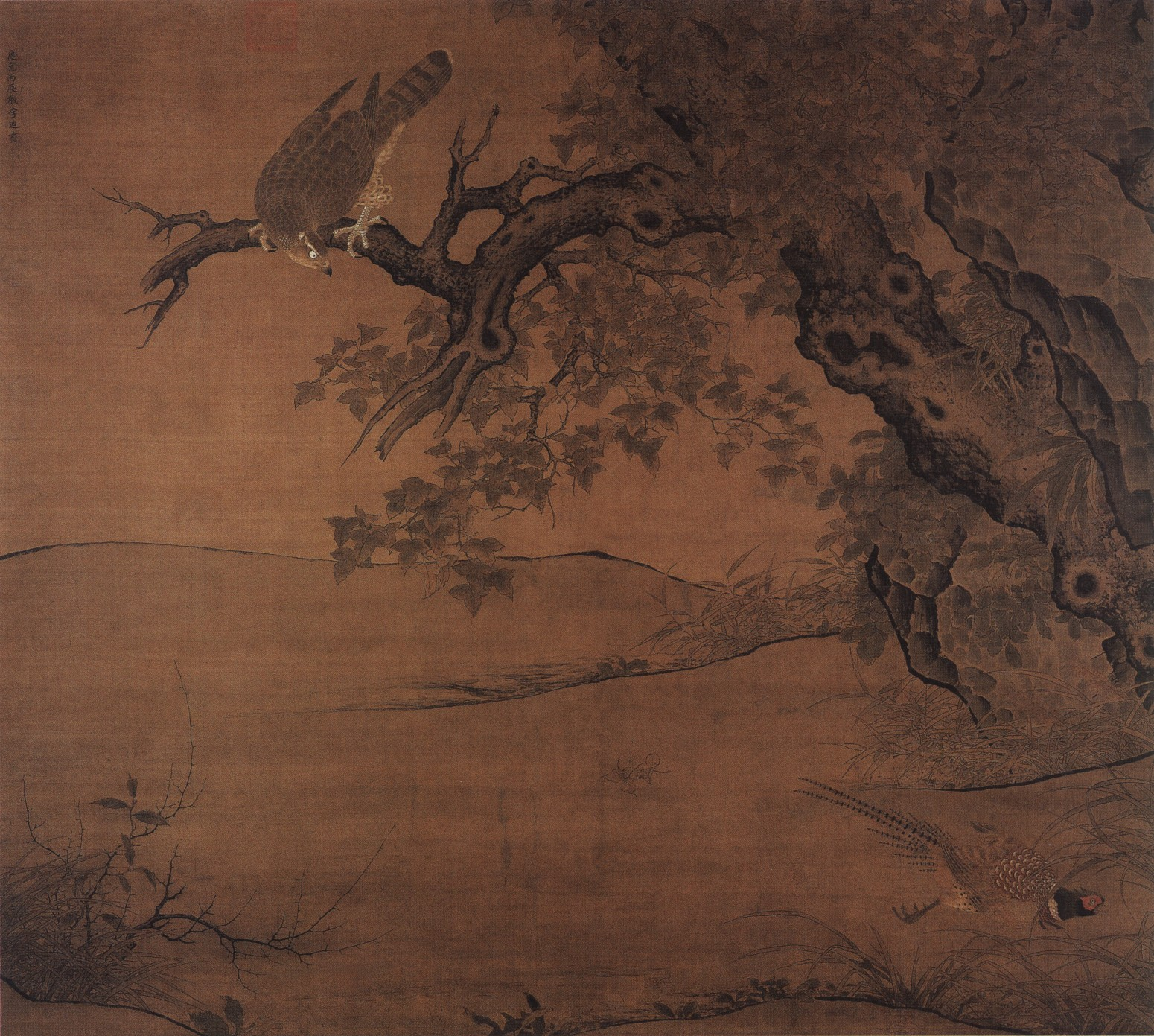
Maple, Falcon, and Golden Pheasant (1196). Palace Museum.

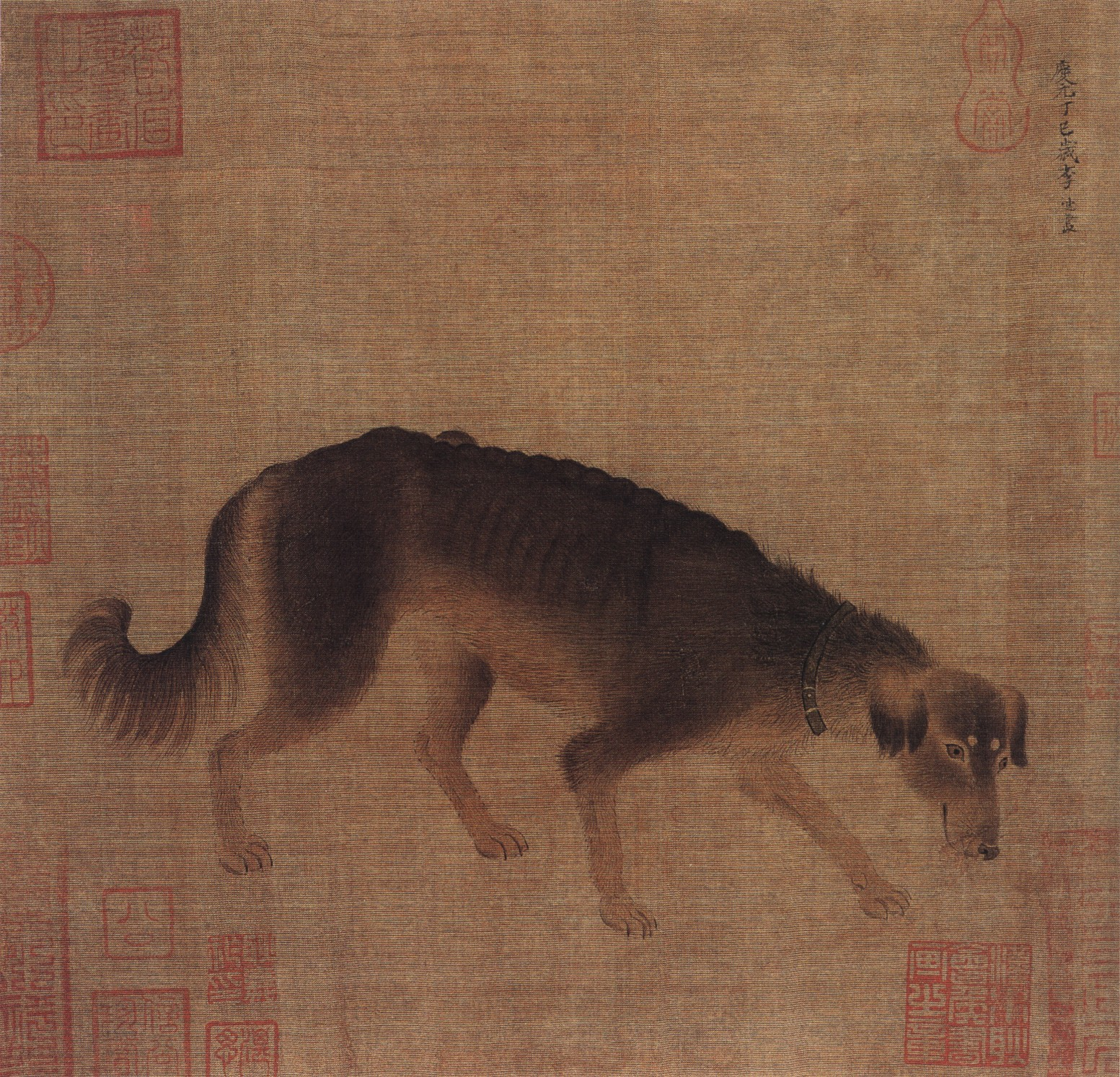
Hunting Dog. Palace Museum.

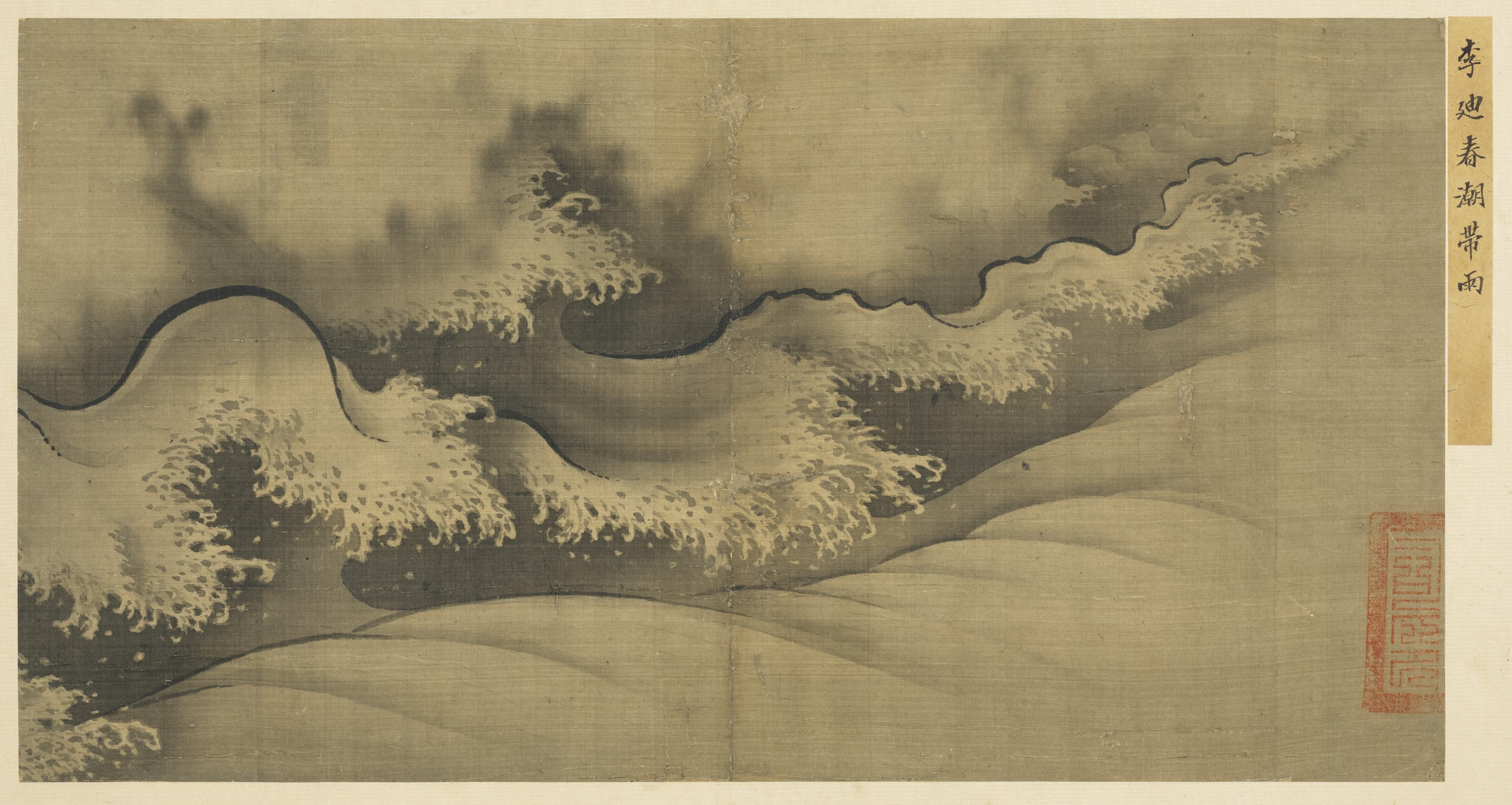
The Spring Tide Brings Rain. National Palace Museum.

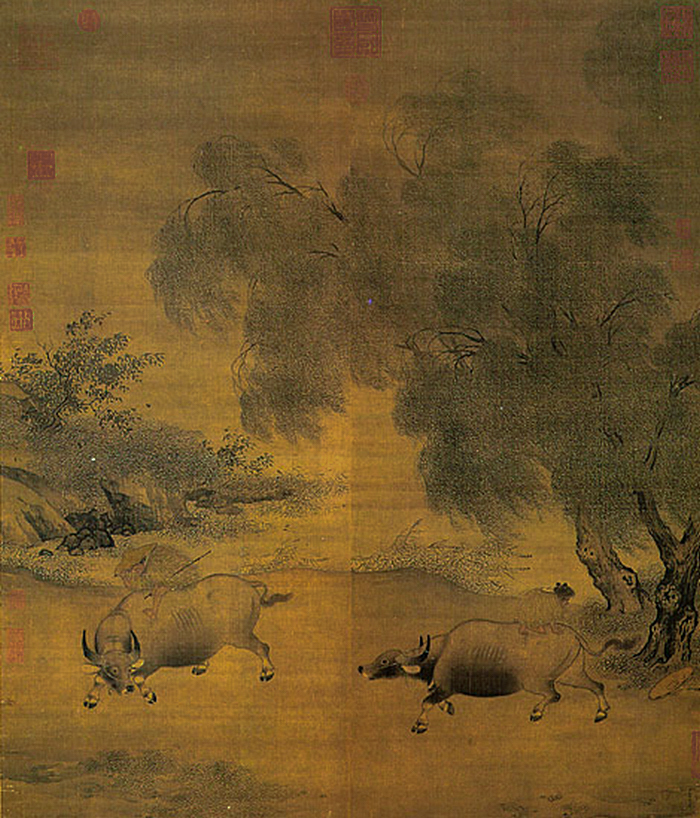
Oxherds in Wind and Rain. National Palace Museum.
