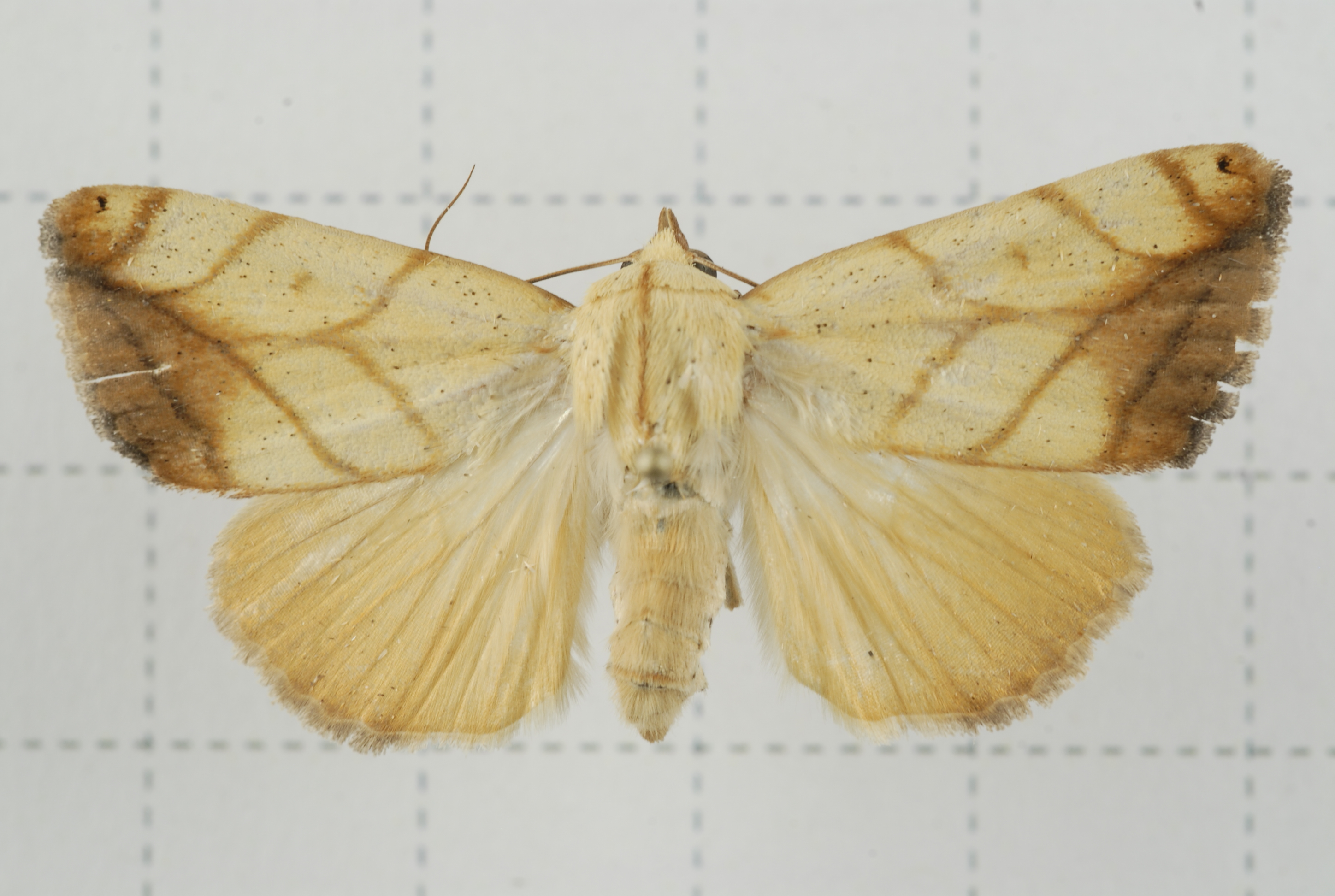

Scientific classification
- Kingdom: Animalia
- Phylum: Arthropoda
- Class: Insecta
- Order: Lepidoptera
- Superfamily: Noctuoidea
- Family: Nolidae
- Genus: Xanthodes
- Species: X. transversa

Binomial name
- Xanthodes transversa Guenée, 1852

= Xanthodes transversa =

Species of moth

Xanthodes transversa, the transverse moth or hibiscus caterpillar, is a moth of the family Nolidae. The species was first described by Achille Guenée in 1852. It is found in India, Sri Lanka, the Andaman Islands, the Nicobar Islands, China, Hong Kong, Vanuatu, Java, New Guinea, Japan, the Ryukyu Islands, Singapore, Indonesia and Australia.

== Description ==
The wingspan of the female is 36 mm and male is 35–42 mm. Palpi reddish brown and porrect (extending forward). Head, thorax and abdomen bright canary yellow. Vertex of thorax rufous. Legs reddish brown. Tibia with long hairs. Forewings bright yellowish with distinct three brown arrow-shaped lines across each forewing. The caterpillars show remarkable color variations. A large bright rufous triangular patch is found over the whole outer area of the forewings. A black sub-apical speck visible. Cilia rufous. Hindwings reddish brown suffusion with rufous outer margin. The caterpillar is 35–40 mm in length.

It is a multivoltine moth species, where organism having more than two broods or generations per year. The caterpillar is a pest on several economically important crops such as Hibiscus mutabilis, Hibiscus heterophyllus, Hibiscus rosa-sinensis, Hibiscus splendens, Malvaviscus arboreus, Urena lobata, Gossypium, okra (bhendi), Abelmoschus esculentus, Abelmoschus crinitus, Sida, Alcea rosea, Citrus, and Grewia tiliaefolia.

== Gallery ==
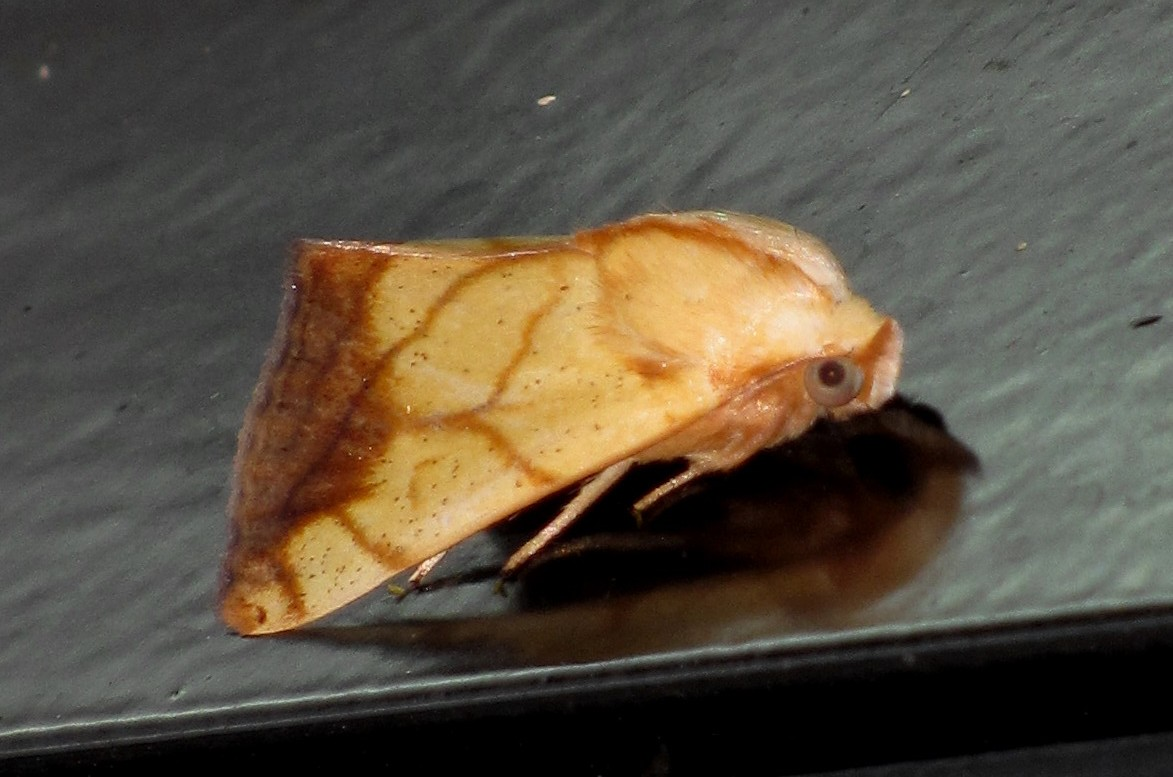

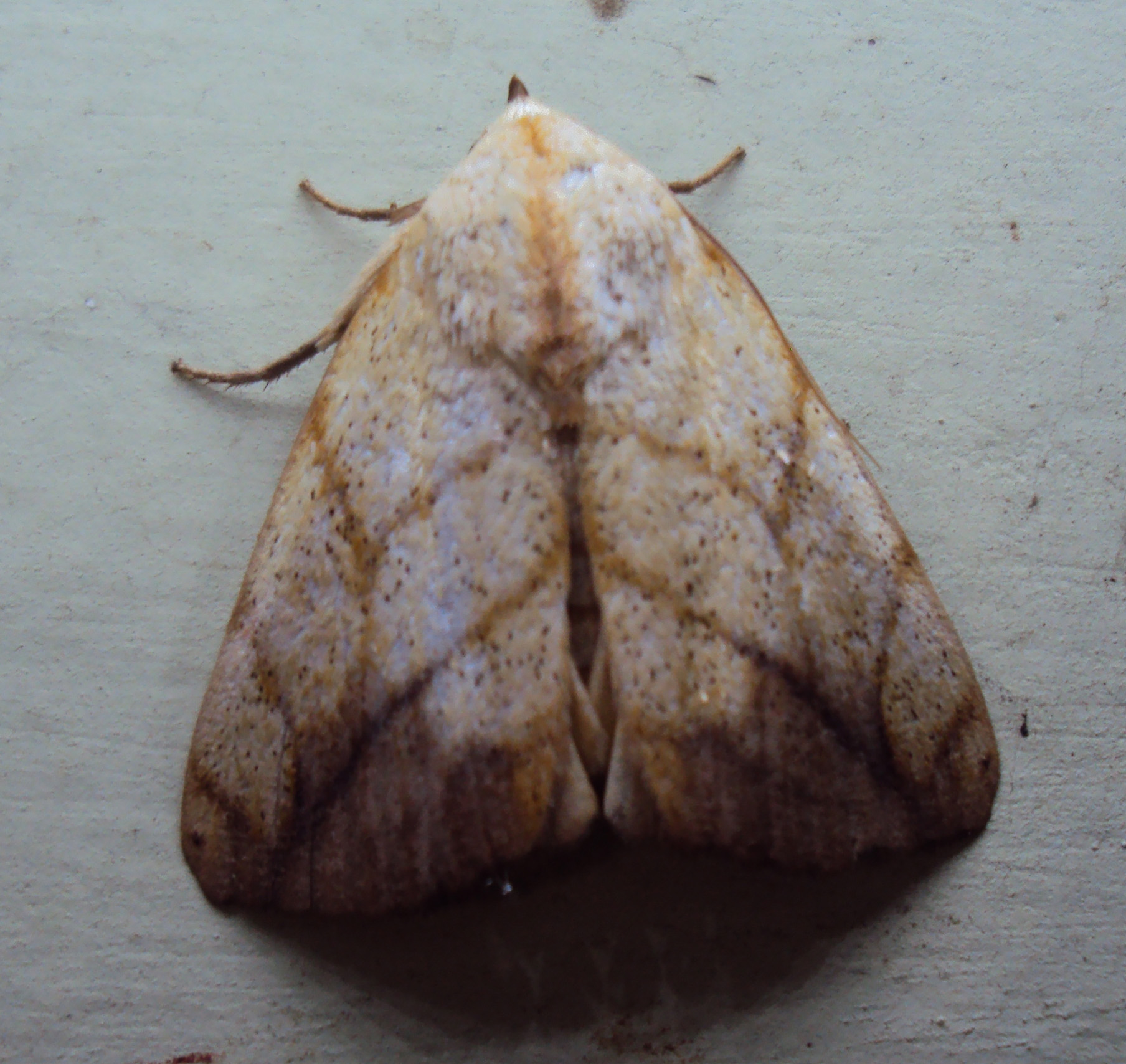

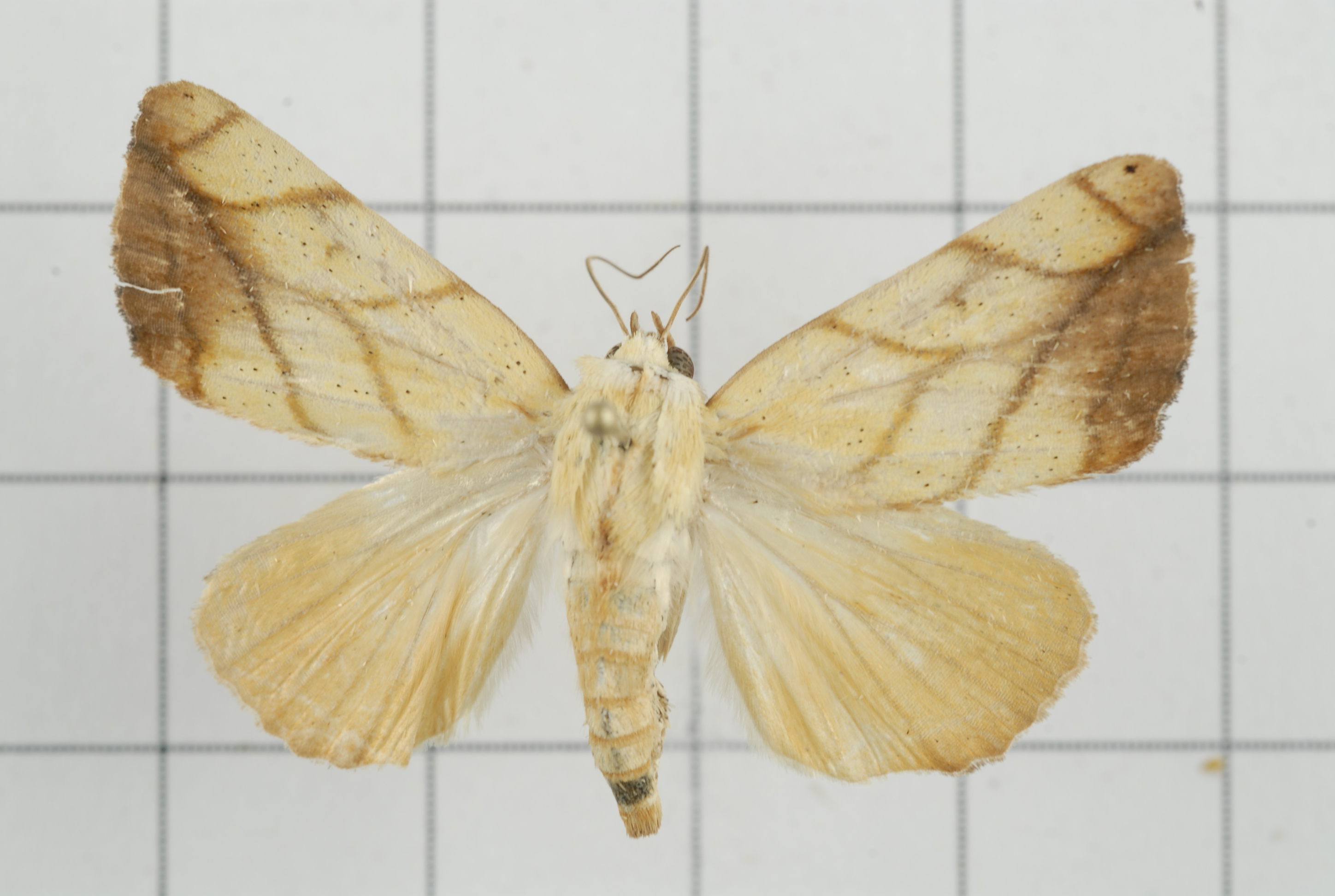

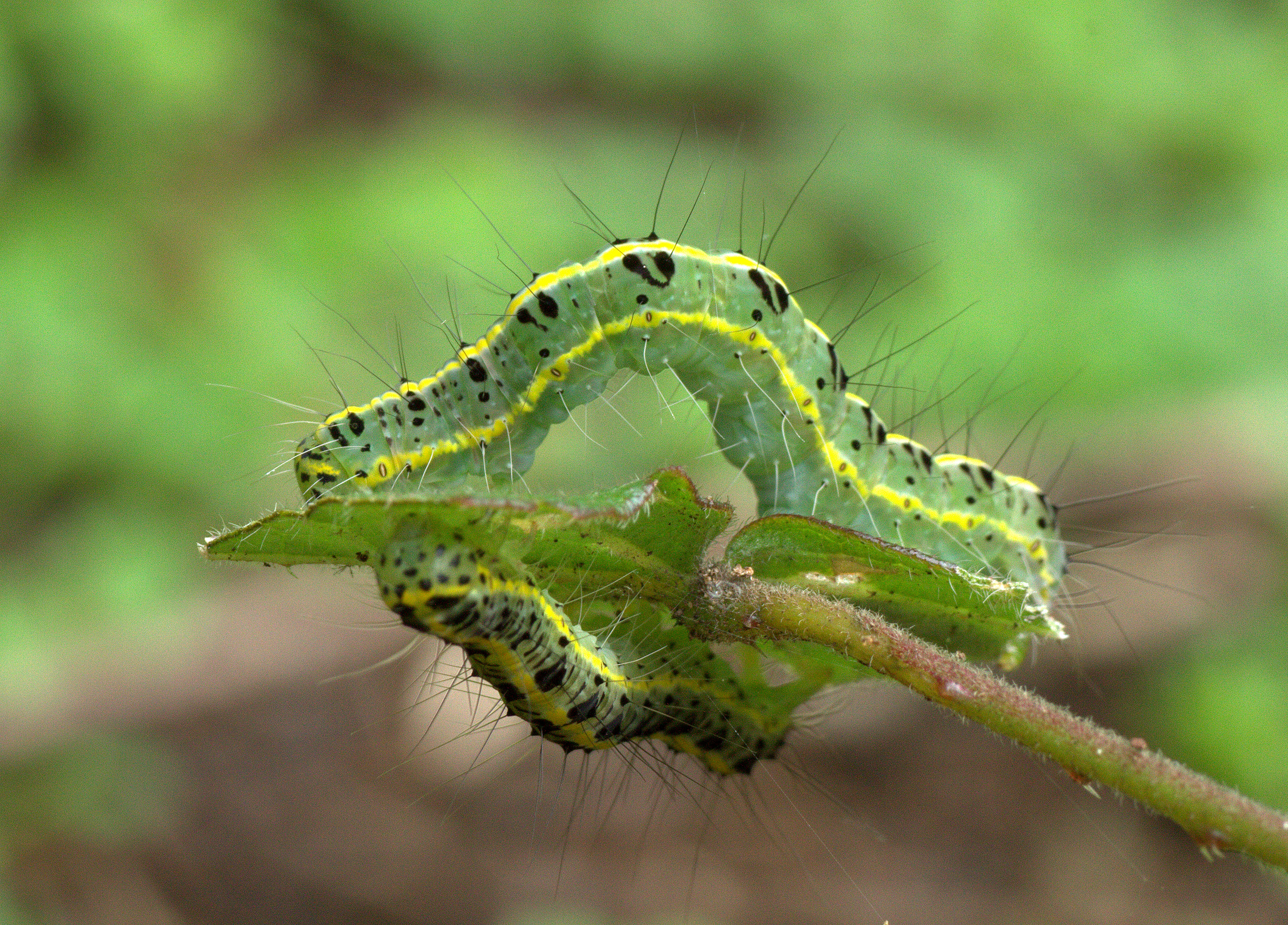

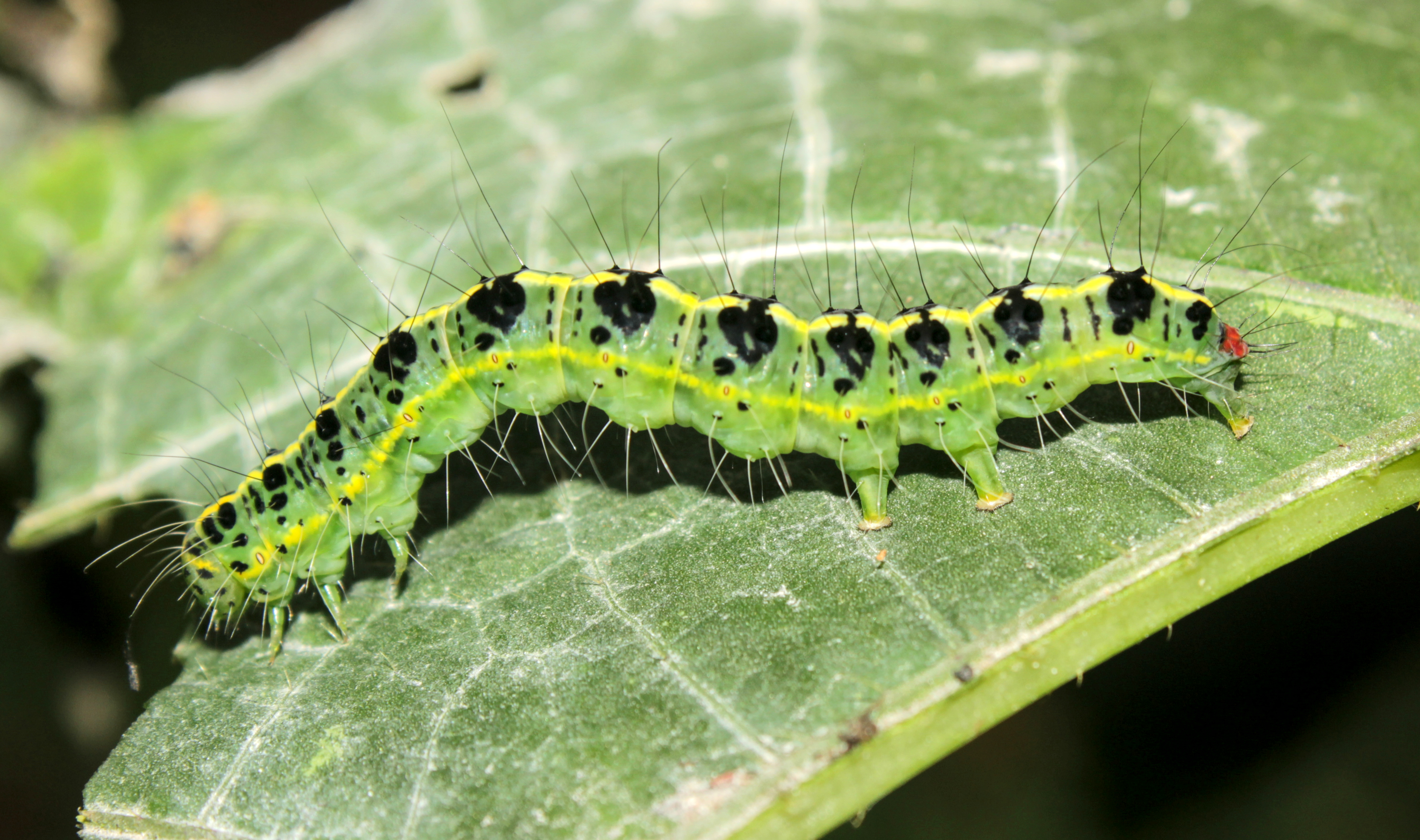
