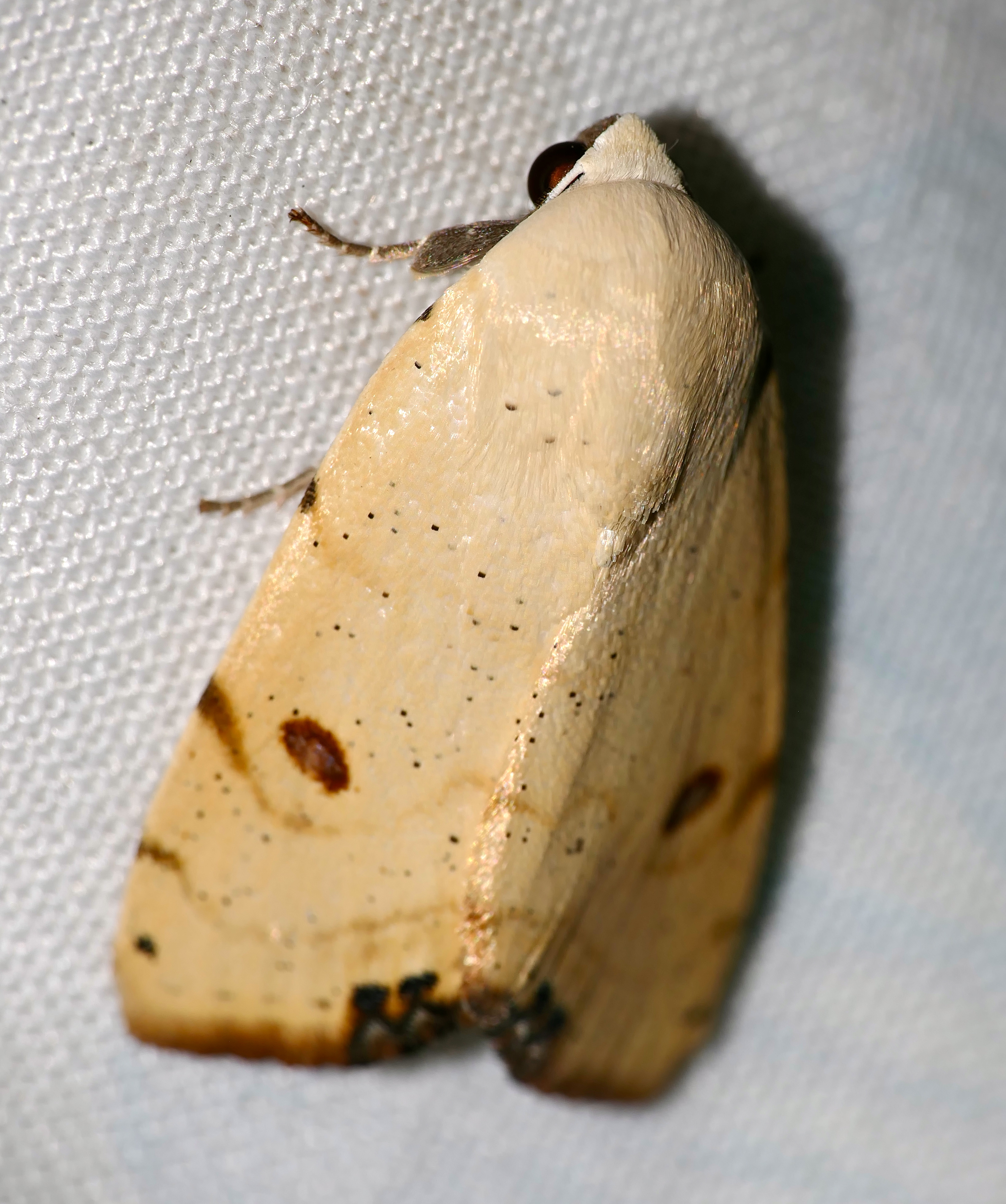
- Xanthodes albago

Scientific classification
- Kingdom: Animalia
- Phylum: Arthropoda
- Class: Insecta
- Order: Lepidoptera
- Superfamily: Noctuoidea
- Family: Nolidae
- Subfamily: Chloephorinae
- Genus: Xanthodes; Guenée, 1852

= Xanthodes =

Genus of moths

Xanthodes is a genus of moths of the family Nolidae. The genus was erected by Achille Guenée in 1852.

== Species ==
- Xanthodes albago (Fabricius, 1794)
- Xanthodes amata Walker, 1865
- Xanthodes congenita (Hampson, 1912)
- Xanthodes dinarodes (Hampson, 1912)
- Xanthodes dohertyi (C. Swinhoe, 1918)
- Xanthodes emboloscia (Turner, 1902)
- Xanthodes gephyrias (Meyrick, 1902)
- Xanthodes intersepta Guenée, 1852
- Xanthodes tabulata (C. Swinhoe, 1918)
- Xanthodes transversa Guenée, 1852
