= Microcos globulifera =

Conservation status
- Least Concern (IUCN 3.1)

Scientific classification
- Kingdom: Plantae
- Clade: Tracheophytes
- Clade: Angiosperms
- Clade: Eudicots
- Clade: Rosids
- Order: Malvales
- Family: Malvaceae
- Genus: Microcos
- Species: M. globulifera

Binomial name
- Microcos globulifera (Mast.) Burret

Synonyms
- Grewia globulifera Mast.

Species of tree

Microcos globulifera is a species of flowering plant in the family Malvaceae. It is a tree endemic to Peninsular Malaysia. It is threatened by habitat loss.
