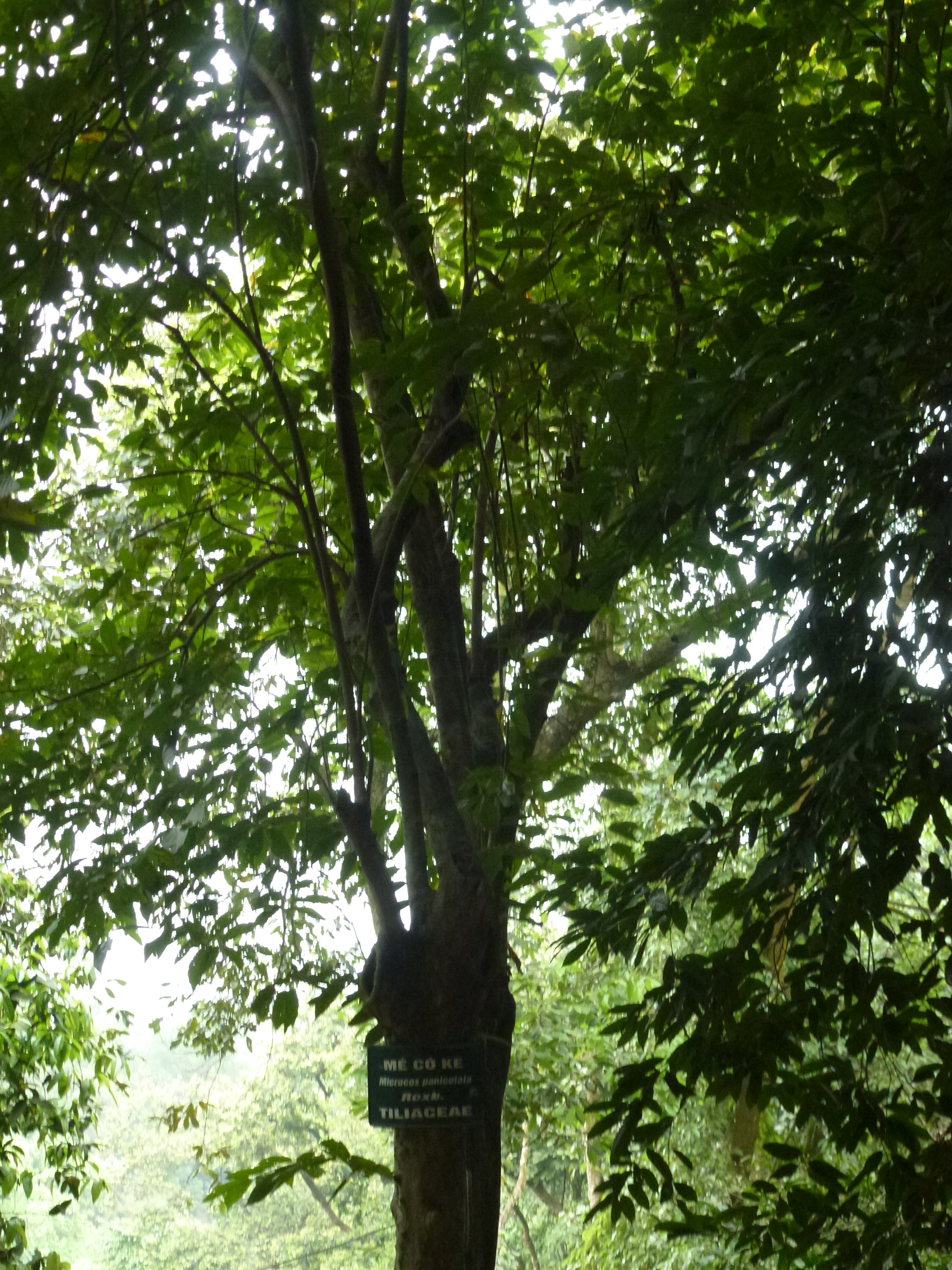
- Microcos paniculata

Scientific classification
- Kingdom: Plantae
- Clade: Tracheophytes
- Clade: Angiosperms
- Clade: Eudicots
- Clade: Rosids
- Order: Malvales
- Family: Malvaceae
- Subfamily: Grewioideae
- Genus: Microcos; Burm. ex L.

= Microcos =

Genus of plants

Microcos is a genus of flowering plants in the family Malvaceae sensu lato or Tiliaceae or Sparrmanniaceae.

== Species ==
Plants of the World Online lists:

- Microcos africana (Hook.f.) Burret
- Microcos antidesmifolia (King) Burret
- Microcos argentata Burret
- Microcos barombiensis (K.Schum.) Cheek
- Microcos bifida Burret
- Microcos borneensis Burret
- Microcos branderhorstii Burret
- Microcos brassii Summerh.
- Microcos calophylla Burret
- Microcos calymmatosepala (K.Schum.) Burret
- Microcos ceramensis Burret
- Microcos cerasifera Chiov.
- Microcos chrysothyrsa Burret
- Microcos chungii (Merr.) Chun
- Microcos cinnamomifolia Burret
- Microcos conocarpa Burret
- Microcos conocarpoides (Burret) Burret
- Microcos coriacea Burret
- Microcos crassifolia Burret
- Microcos dulitensis Airy Shaw
- Microcos erythrocarpa (Ridl.) Airy Shaw
- Microcos fibrocarpa (Mast.) Burret
- Microcos floribunda (Mast.) Burret
- Microcos florida (Miq.) Burret
- Microcos globulifera (Mast.) Burret
- Microcos gossweileri Burret
- Microcos gracilis Stapf ex Ridl.
- Microcos grandiflora Burret
- Microcos grandifolia (Pulle) Burret
- Microcos havilandii Ridl.
- Microcos henrici (Baker f.) Burret
- Microcos heterotricha (Mast.) Burret
- Microcos hirsuta (Korth.) Burret
- Microcos impressinervia Merr.
- Microcos inflexa (Merr.) Burret
- Microcos kinabaluensis R.C.K.Chung
- Microcos lanceolata (Miq.) Burret
- Microcos latifolia Burret
- Microcos latistipulata (Ridl.) Burret
- Microcos laurifolia (Hook.f. ex Mast.) Burret
- Microcos ledermannii Burret
- Microcos loerzingii Burret
- Microcos magnifica Cheek
- Microcos malacocarpa (Mast.) Burret
- Microcos malayana R.C.K.Chung
- Microcos membranifolia R.C.K.Chung
- Microcos microthyrsa (K.Schum. ex Burret) Burret
- Microcos mildbraedii (Burret) Burret
- Microcos oligoneura (Sprague) Burret
- Microcos opaca (Korth.) Burret
- Microcos ossea Burret
- Microcos pachyphylla Merr.
- Microcos paniculata L.
- Microcos paucicostata Burret
- Microcos pearsonii (Merr.) Burret
- Microcos peekelii Burret
- Microcos pentandra Burret
- Microcos phaneroneura Burret
- Microcos philippinensis (G.Perkins) Burret
- Microcos pinnatifida (Mast.) Burret
- Microcos psilonema Burret
- Microcos reticulata Ridl.
- Microcos riparia (Boerl. & Koord.-Schum.) Burret
- Microcos saccinervia Burret
- Microcos schlechteri Burret
- Microcos seretii (De Wild.) Burret
- Microcos sinuata (Wall. ex Mast.) Burret
- Microcos stauntoniana G.Don
- Microcos stylocarpoides Burret
- Microcos subcordifolia R.C.K.Chung
- Microcos subepetala Stapf ex Ridl.
- Microcos sumatrana (Baker f.) Burret
- Microcos tetrasperma Merr. & L.M.Perry
- Microcos tomentosa Sm.
- Microcos triflora (Blanco) R.C.K.Chung
- Microcos ugandensis (Sprague) Burret
- Microcos urbaniana (Lauterb.) Burret
- Microcos vitiensis A.C.Sm.
