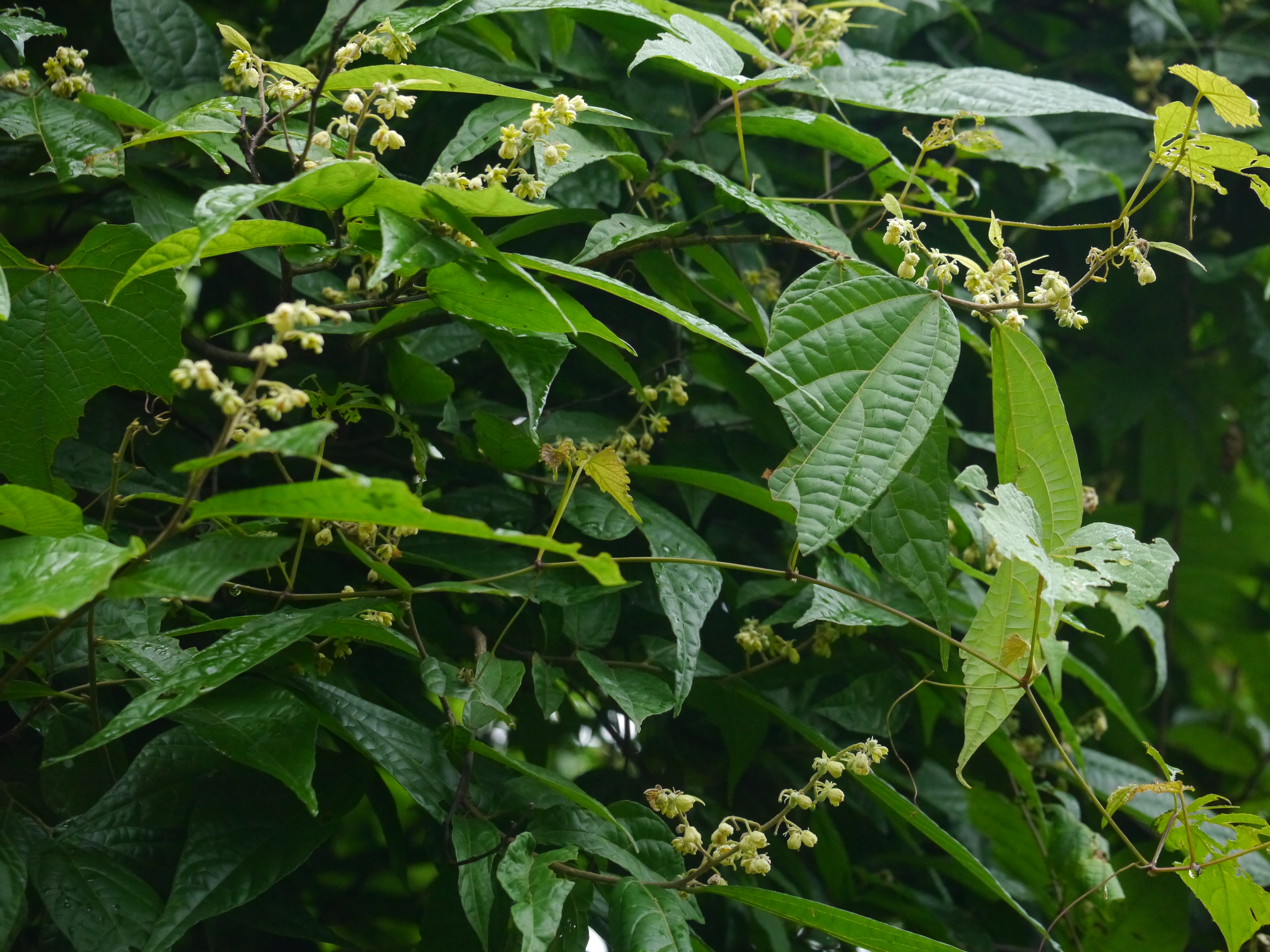

Scientific classification
- Kingdom: Plantae
- Clade: Tracheophytes
- Clade: Angiosperms
- Clade: Eudicots
- Clade: Rosids
- Order: Malvales
- Family: Malvaceae
- Genus: Microcos
- Species: M. paniculata

Binomial name
- Microcos paniculata L.

Synonyms
- Microcos nervosa (Lour.) S.Y. Hu

= Microcos paniculata =

Species of shrub

Microcos paniculata is a flowering shrub native to China and south-east Asia including India. It is also included in Indian Ayurveda. It is sometimes added to Chinese herbal tea, having a mildly sour taste. In traditional Chinese medicine the plant is believed to help the digestive system, and it is also used for other health problems including colds, hepatitis, diarrhea, heat stroke, and dyspepsia.

== Common names ==
Sources:

- Burmese – Myaya (မြရာ)
- Hindi – Shiral (शिरल)
- Marathi – Shirali
- Konkani (Goa) – Asali
- Tamil – Visalam
- Malayalam – Kottakka
- Kannada – Biliyabhhrangu
- Bengali – Asar
- Sinhala – Keliya (කෑලිය) / Kohu-kirilla (කොහු-කිරිල්ල)
