= Luohan Temple (Chongqing) =

Buddhist temple in Chongqing, China

- 罗汉寺
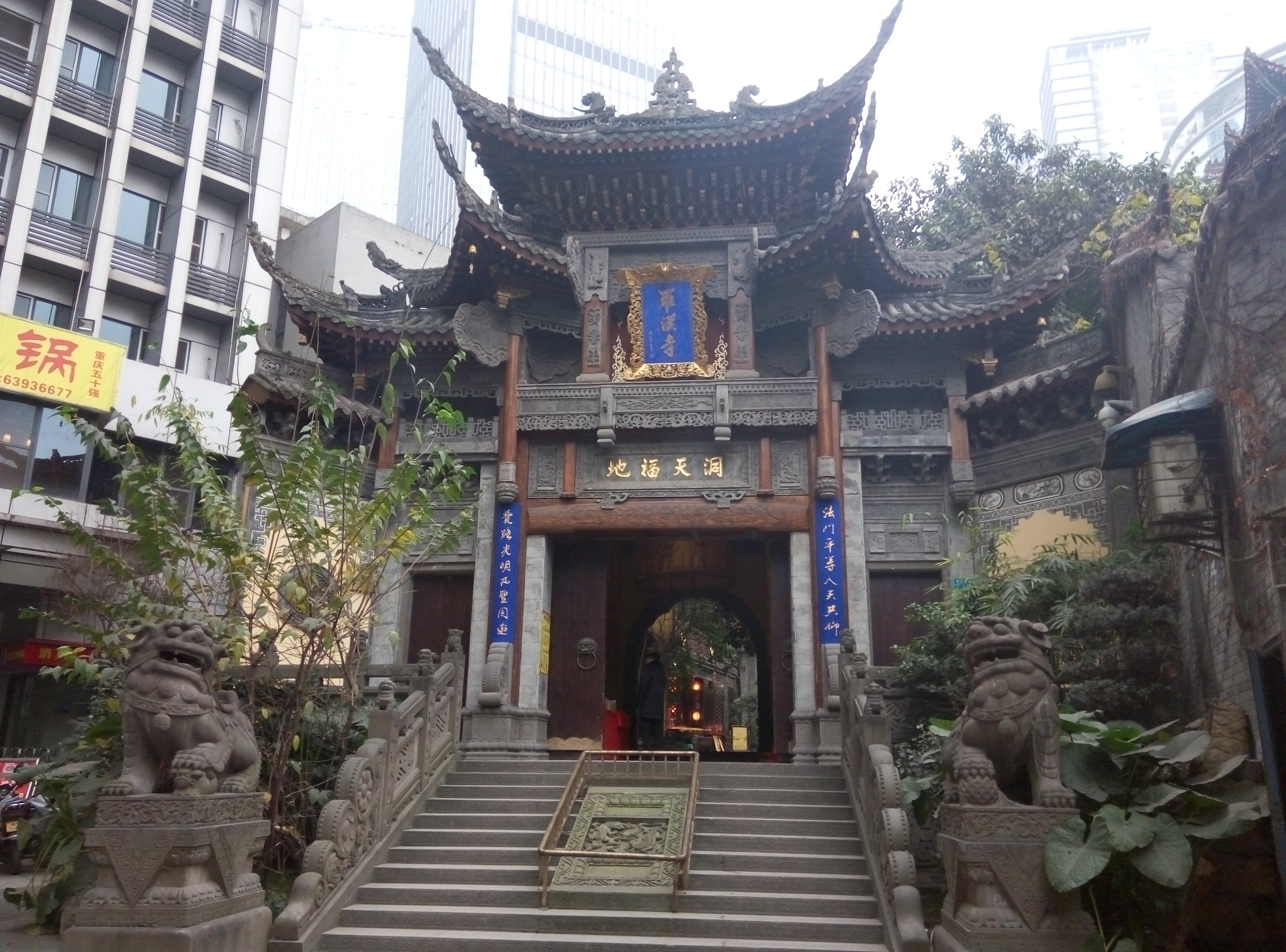
- Shanmen at Luohan Temple.

- Location within Chongqing

Religion
- Affiliation: Buddhism
- Leadership: Shi Zhifeng (释智丰)

Location
- Location: Yuzhong District, Chongqing
- Country: China
- Coordinates: 29°33′58″N 106°35′16″E

Architecture
- Style: Chinese architecture
- Founder: Zuyue (祖月)
- Established: Zhiping period (1064–1067)
- Construction cost: 1947 (reconstruction)

Luohan Temple (simplified Chinese: 罗汉寺; traditional Chinese: 羅漢寺; pinyin: Luóhàn Sì; lit. 'Temple of Arhat') is a Buddhist temple located in Yuzhong District, Chongqing. It is the site of the Buddhist Association of Chongqing. The temple was used for Ning Hao's black comedy film Crazy Stone.

== History ==
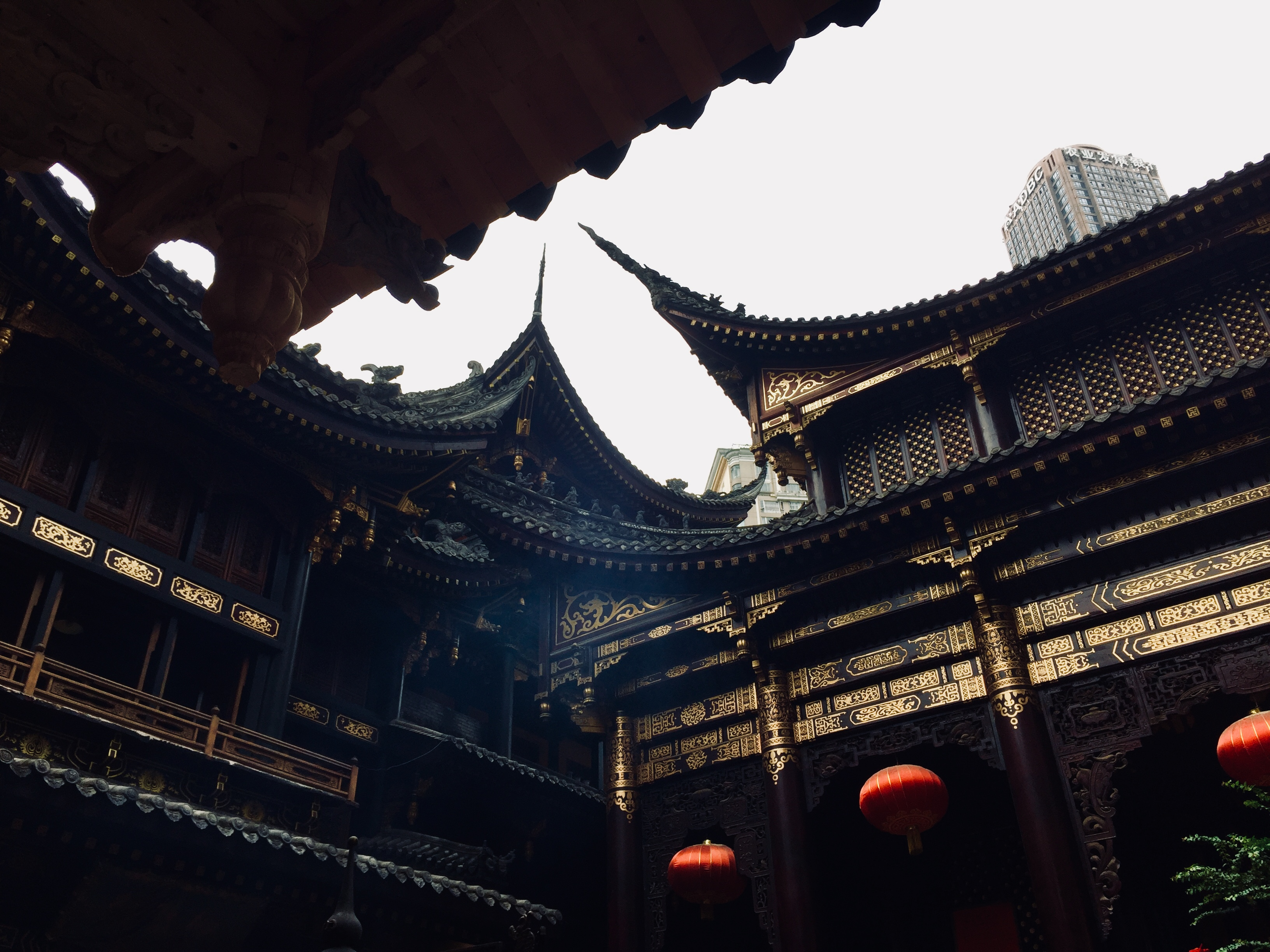
Halls at Luohan Temple.

=== Song dynasty ===
This temple was built by a prominent monk Zuyue (祖月) in the Zhiping period (1064–1067) of the Song dynasty (960–1276). At that time it initially called "Zhiping Temple", which was named after the reign title of "Zhiping".

=== Ming dynasty ===
In the Xuande period (1426–1435) of the Ming dynasty (1368–1644), monk Xi'an (曦庵) erected the dwellings, wing-rooms, and reception rooms.

=== Qing dynasty ===
In 1666, in the 5th year of Kangxi period in the Qing dynasty (1644–1911), governor-general Li Guoying (李国英) renovated the temple. Then the temple was refurbished in 1753 during the reign of Qianlong Emperor. In 1885 in the Guangxu era, abbot Longfa (隆法) supervised the construction of 500 statues of Arhat, the temple was renowned "Luohan Temple".

=== Republic of China ===
After the founding of the Republic of China in 1912, Shi Haiqing (释海清) added the Dharma Hall, Ordination Hall, Meditation Hall in the temple. The temple was burned out in one of the numerous air raids that targeted Chongqing during the Second Sino-Japanese War on May 4, 1939. Only the Shanmen and Thousand Buddha Rock survived. By 1947, under the leadership of Zongxian (宗仙), the Mahavira Hall, Buddhist Texts Library, Arhat Hall were gradually rebuilt.

=== People's Republic of China ===
During the ten-year Cultural Revolution, the Red Guards had attacked the temple in 1966. The 500 statues of Arhat were smashed by them.

After the 3rd plenary session of the 11th Central Committee of the Chinese Communist Party, according to the national policy of free religious belief, Luohan Temple was officially reopened to the public in 1984. The Chongqing Municipal Government appropriated a large sum of money for constructing the temple.

Luohan Temple has been inscribed as a National Key Buddhist Temple in Han Chinese Area by the State Council of China in 1983. In September 2006, the temple has been designated as a provincial key cultural unit by the Chongqing Municipal Government.

== Architecture ==
=== Mahavira Hall ===
The Mahavira Hall was built in 1947. In the middle of the hall placed the statue of Sakyamuni, at the back of Sakyamuni's statue are statues of the Three Sages of the West (西方三圣), namely Guanyin, Amitabha and Mahasthamaprapta. The statues of Sixteen Arhats stand on both sides of the hall.

=== Arhat Hall ===
The Arhat Hall was constructed in 1986; a total of 524 statues of Arhat are enshrined in the hall.

== National Treasure ==
The temple is renowned for its cliff inscriptions. Over 400 statues of Buddha are carved with integrate structural and exquisite techniques, they were made in the Song dynasty.

== Film ==
Luohan Temple was used for location filming of the 2006 black comedy film Crazy Stone.
