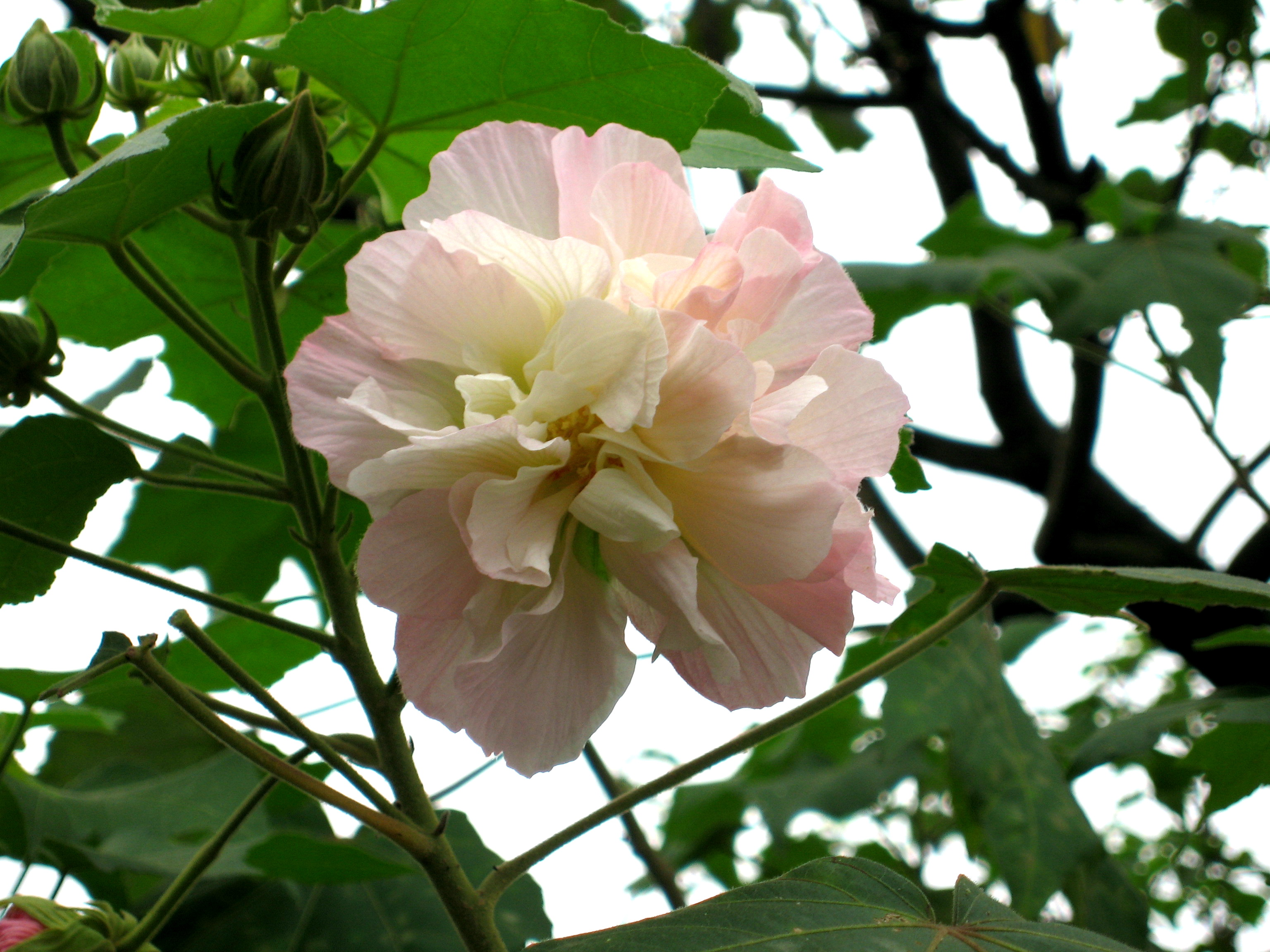

Scientific classification
- Kingdom: Plantae
- Clade: Embryophytes
- Clade: Tracheophytes
- Clade: Angiosperms
- Clade: Eudicots
- Clade: Rosids
- Order: Malvales
- Family: Malvaceae
- Genus: Hibiscus
- Species: H. mutabilis

Binomial name
- Hibiscus mutabilis L.

= Hibiscus mutabilis =

Species of flowering plant

Hibiscus mutabilis, also known as the cotton rose or rosemallow, a plant long cultivated for its showy flowers. Originally native to southern China, where it is known as 木芙蓉, ("Mùfúróng") it is now found on all continents except Antarctica. It is a mallow (family Malvaceae) not a true rose (family Rosaceae). Alternative names in parts of the United States are Confederate rose and Dixie rosemallow.

== Description ==
Cotton roses are semi-deciduous with palmately lobed leaves. They tend to be large shrubs or treelike in zones 9 and 10, though they have a more modest shrub-like appearance more north. Stems and petioles feature dense stellate and glandular hairs.

Flowers can be double or single and are 4–6 in (10–15 cm) in diameter; they open white or pink, and change to deep red by evening. The 'Rubra' variety has red flowers. Single blooming flowers are generally cup-shaped. Bloom season usually lasts from summer through fall. When it does not freeze, the cotton rose can reach heights of 12–15 ft (3.7–4.6 m) with a woody trunk. However, a much bushier plant 5–6 ft (1.5–1.8 m) high is more typical and provides more flowering.

The flowers are attractive to pollinators, including the specialized bee Ptilothrix bombiformis.

== Cultivation ==
Propagation by root cuttings is the easiest and is done in early spring, but cuttings can be taken at almost any time. These plants have a very fast growth rate. The cotton rose can thrive in the southern parts of the United States, leading to its association with the 1861 to 1865 secessionist movement known as the American confederacy, hence the alternative name in some areas. It grows nicely in full sun or partial shade, and prefers rich, well-drained soil.

In cultivation in the UK, Hibiscus mutabilis has gained the Royal Horticultural Society's Award of Garden Merit.

== Floral color change ==
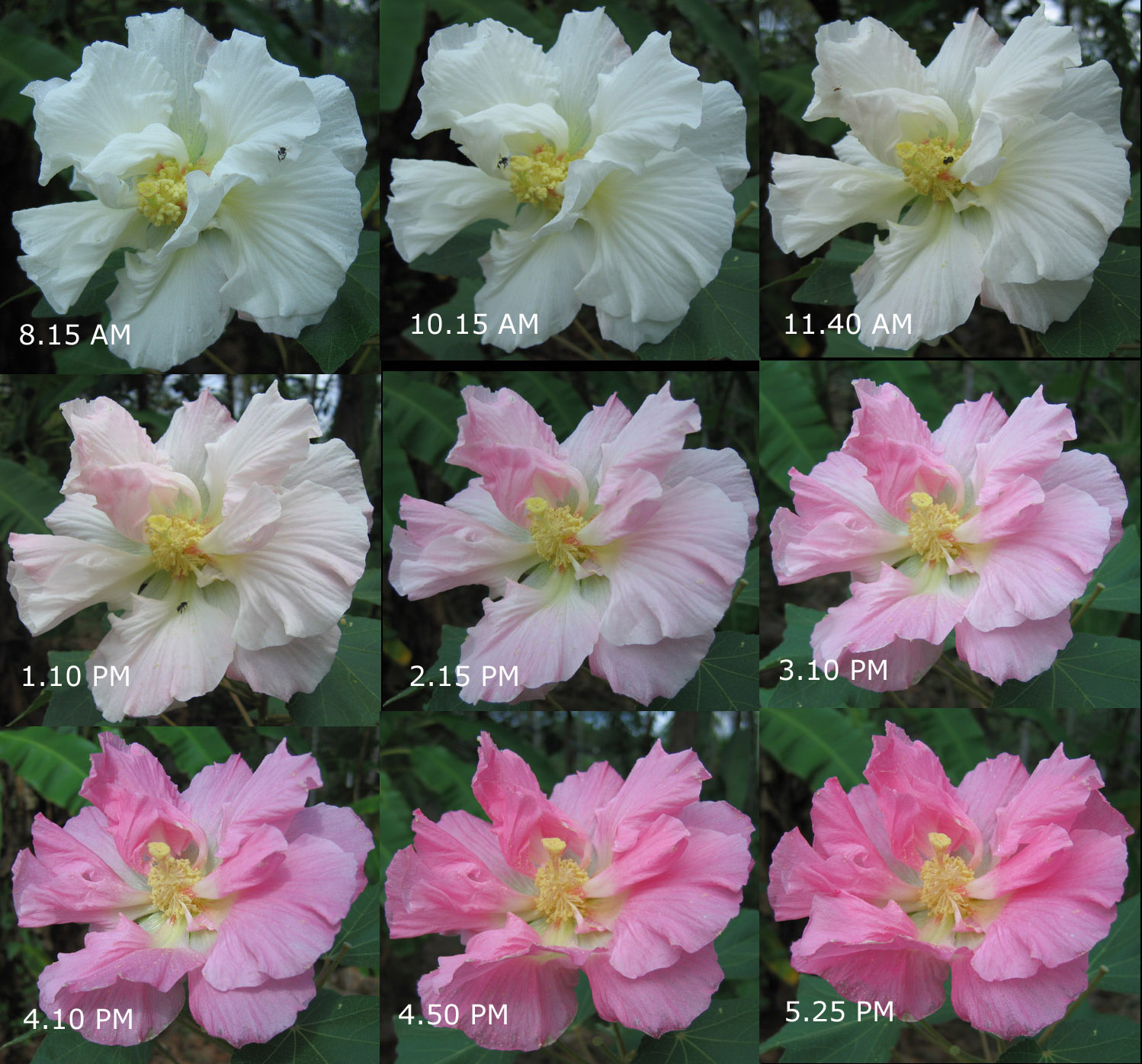
Changing colors of the flower during a day

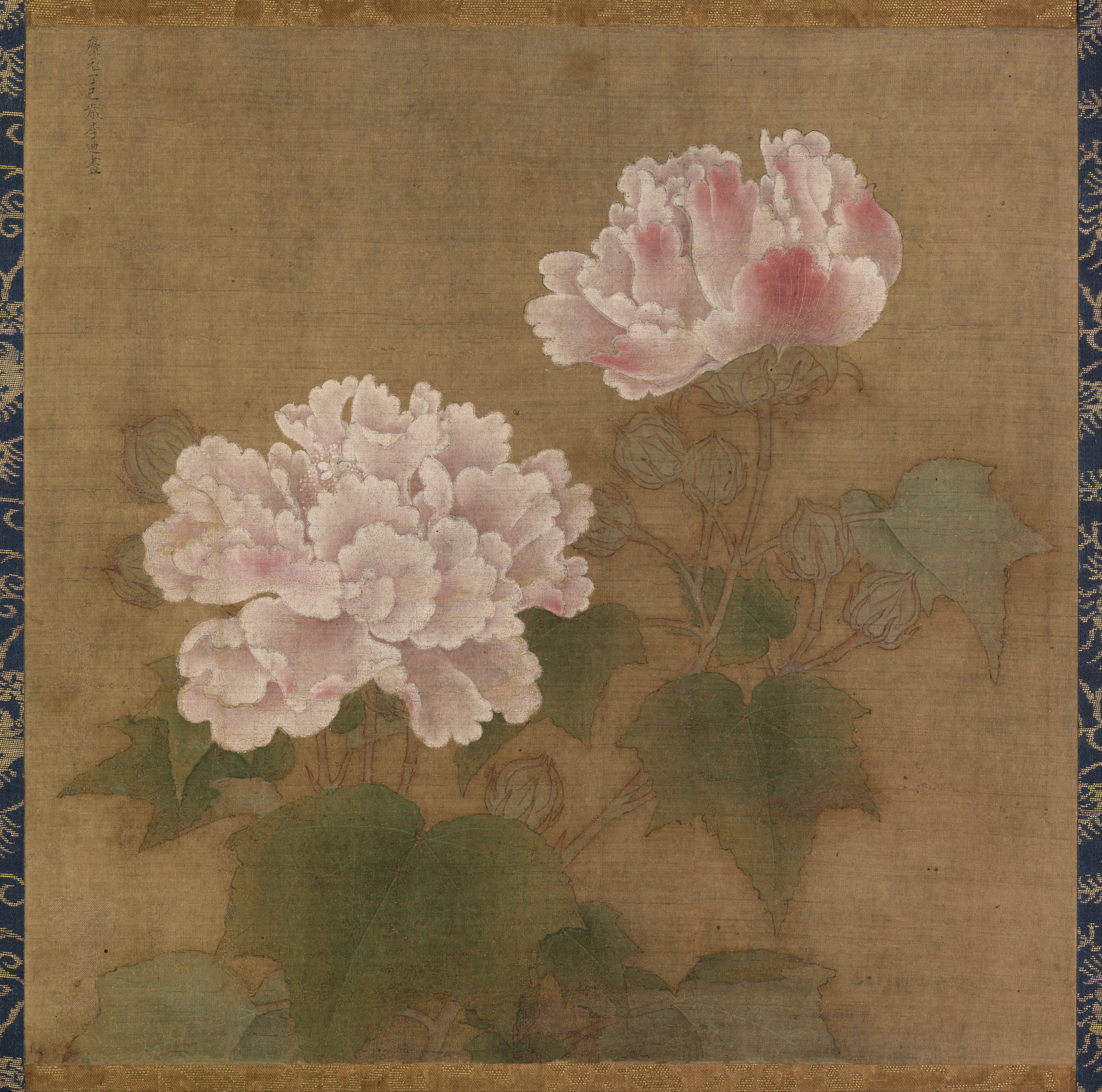
Red and White Cotton Roses, a historical painting by Li Di (李迪), which shows the flowers with changing colors. China, Song dynasty, 1197 AD

Floral color change occurs in H. mutabilis when flowers are white in the morning, turning pink during noon and red in the evening of the same day. Under laboratory conditions, the color change of the petals was slower than that of flowers under outdoor conditions. Temperature may be an important factor, affecting the rate of color change as white flowers kept in the refrigerator remain white until they are taken out to warm up, whereupon they slowly turn pink.

The red flowers remain on plants for several days before they abort. Weight of a single detached flower was 15.6 g (0.55 oz) when white, 12.7 g (0.45 oz) when pink and 11.0 g (0.39 oz) when red. Anthocyanin content of red flowers was three times that of pink flowers and eight times that of white flowers. There was a significant increase in phenolic content with color change. Overall ranking of antioxidant properties of H. mutabilis flowers was red > pink > white.

Subramanian and Nair postulated that anthocyanins in pink and red flowers of H. mutabilis are synthesized independently since there is no reduction in phenolic content. However, Lowry suggested that anthocyanins are formed through direct conversion from flavonols as they have structural similarities.
