= Sparrmanniaceae =

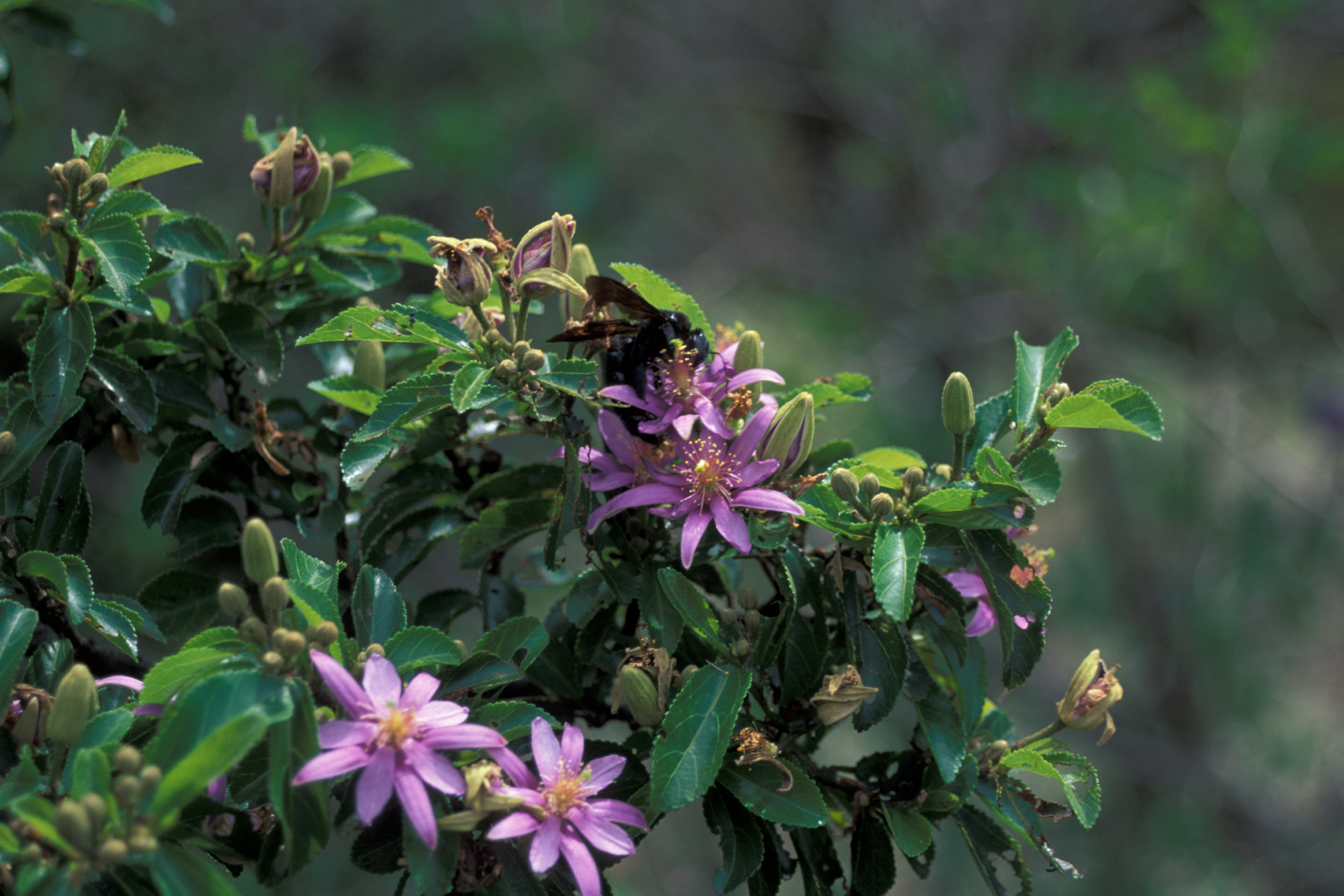
Crossberry, Grewia occidentalis

Sparrmanniaceae is a segregate, probably obsolete, plant family, containing plants which have more commonly been classified in Malvaceae or Tiliaceae.

In the most recent proposed circumscription, that of Cheek ex Heywood et al., it corresponds to subfamily Grewioideae of the APG family Malvaceae.

Genera formerly included in the Sparrmanniaceae:

- Ancistrocarpus
- Apeiba
- Clappertonia
- Colona
- Corchorus
- Desplatsia
- Duboscia
- Eleutherostylis
- Entelea
- Erinocarpus
- Glyphaea
- Goethalsia
- Grewia
- Heliocarpus
- Hydrogaster
- Luehea
- Lueheopsis
- Microcos
- Mollia
- Pseudocorchorus
- Sparrmannia
- Tetralix
- Trichospermum
- Triumfetta
- Vasivaea
- Vinticena
