= Tiliaceae =

Family of plants

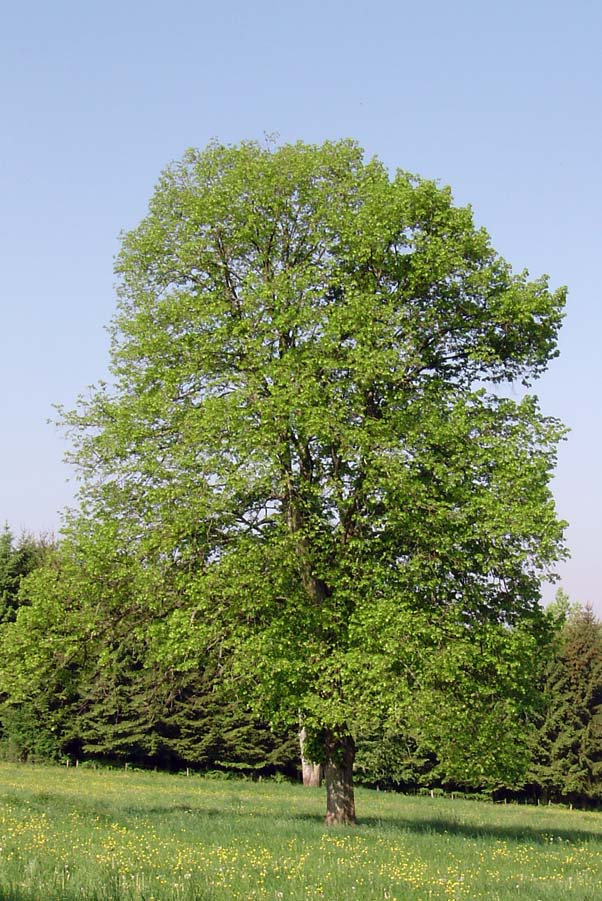
Tilia cordata

Tiliaceae (/ˌtɪliˈeɪsi.iː, -ˌaɪ/) is a family of flowering plants. It is not a part of the APG, APG II and APG III classifications, being sunk in Malvaceae mostly as the subfamilies Tilioideae, Brownlowioideae and Grewioideae, but has an extensive historical record of use.

All through its existence the family has had a very lively history, with various authors taking very different views on what should be part of this family. As a result, it is recommended when this name is encountered to check what the author means.

However, in the northern temperate regions the name is unambiguous as the only representative is Tilia, the lime or linden.

== APG II system ==
The APG II system, does not recognise this as a family but submerges it in the Malvaceae sensu lato, which unites the four families Bombacaceae, Malvaceae sensu stricto, Sterculiaceae and Tiliaceae. Modern botanical taxonomy, such as the relevant volume in the Kubitzki series which conforms to APG, treats most of the plants that traditionally constitute the family (see above) in the subfamilies Tilioideae, Brownlowioideae, and Grewioideae within this extended family Malvaceae sensu lato. Cladistically, the traditional family Tiliaceae is polyphyletic.

== de Candolle system ==
In the de Candolle system the circumscription of the family was:

- family Tiliaceae
  genus I. Sparmannia [sic: now Sparrmannia]
  genus II. Abatia
  genus III. Heliocarpus
  genus IV. Antichorus
  genus V. Corchorus
  genus VI. Honckenya [sic, see Clappertonia]
  genus VII. Triumfetta
  genus VIII. Grewia
  genus IX. Columbia [sic, now Colona]
  genus X. Tilia
  genus XI. Diplophractum
  genus XII. Muntingia
  genus XIII. Apeiba
  genus XIV. Sloanea
  genus XV. Ablania
  genus XIV. Gyrostemon
  genus XVII. Christiana
  genus XVIII. Alegria
  genus XIX. Luhea [sic, now: Luehea]
  genus XX. Vatica
  genus XXI. Espera
  genus XXII. Wikstroemia
  genus XXIII. Berrya

According to APG II system, the current placement of these genera is mostly in the Malvaceae sensu lato, but with Gyrostemon moved to family Gyrostemonaceae, Muntingia to family Muntingiaceae, Sloanea to family Elaeocarpaceae, Vatica to family Dipterocarpaceae and Wikstroemia to family Thymelaeaceae (possibly reduced to a synonym of Daphne). The genus Abatia is assigned to the family Salicaceae sensu lato.

== Bentham & Hooker system ==
The family reached perhaps its widest circumscription in the Bentham & Hooker system:

- family XXXIII Tiliaceae
  series A. Holopetalae
  tribus I. Brownlowieae
  genus 1. Brownlowia
  genus 2. Pentace
  genus 3. Diplodiscus
  genus 4. Pityranthe
  genus 5. Christiana
  genus 6. Berrya
  genus 7. Carpodiptera
  tribus II. Grewieae
  genus 8. Grewia
  genus 9. Columbia [sic, now Colona]
  genus 10. Diplophractum
  genus 11. Belotia
  genus 12. Erinocarpus
  genus 13. Triumfetta
  genus 14. Heliocarpus
  tribus III. Tilieae
  genus 15. Entelea
  genus 16. Sparrmannia
  genus 17. Honckenya [sic, see Clappertonia]
  genus 18. Corchorus
  genus 19. Corchoropsis
  genus 20. Luehea
  genus 21. Mollia
  genus 22. Trichospermum
  genus 23. Muntingia
  genus 24. Tilia
  genus 25. Leptonychia
  genus 26. Schoutenia
  tribus IV. Apeibeae
  genus 27. Glypilea
  genus 28. Apeiba
  series B. Heteropetalae
  tribus V. Prockieae
  genus 29. Prockia
  genus 30. Hasseltia
  genus 31. Plagiopteron
  genus 32? Ropalocarpus
  tribus VI. Sloanieae
  genus 33. Vallea
  genus 34. Sloanea
  genus 35. Echinocarpus
  genus 36. Antholoma
  tribus VII. Elaeocarpeae
  genus 37. Aristotelia
  genus 38. Elaeocarpus
  genus 39. Dubouzetia
  genus 40. Tricuspidaria

According to APG II system, the current placement of these genera is perhaps mostly in the Malvaceae sensu lato, but with Muntingia moved to family Muntingiaceae, while tribes VI and VII form the core of family Elaeocarpaceae and tribe V has been moved to the family Salicaceae sensu lato.

The Hutchinson system follows the Bentham & Hooker system rather closely.

== Cronquist system ==
In the Cronquist system (1981) the family includes some fifty genera, totalling around seven hundred species of trees and shrubs, rarely herbs, with a subcosmopolitan distribution. It may be separated from Malvaceae sensu stricto by the smooth surface of the pollen grains, bilocular anthers, and the stamens free or in bundles (but not monadelphous)

- Ancistrocarpus Oliv.
- Apeiba Aubl.
- Asterophorum Sprague
- Berrya Roxb.
- Brownlowia Roxb.
- Burretiodendron Rehder
- Carpodiptera Griseb.
- Christiana DC.
- Clappertonia Meisn.
- Colona Cav.
- Corchoropsis Siebold & Zucc.
- Corchorus L.
- Craigia W.W.Sm. & W.E.Evans
- Desplatsia Bocq.
- Dicraspidia Standl.
- Diplodiscus Turcz.
- Duboscia Bocquet
- Eleutherostylis Burret
- Entelea R.Br.
- Erinocarpus Nimmo ex J.Graham
- Glyphaea Hook.f.
- Goethalsia Pittier
- Grewia L.
- Hainania Merr.
- Heliocarpus L.
- Hydrogaster Kuhlm.
- Jarandersonia Kosterm.
- Luehea Willd.
- Lueheopsis Burret
- Microcos L.
- Mollia Mart.
- Mortoniodendron Standl. & Steyerm.
- Neotessmannia Burret
- Pentace Hassk.
- Pentaplaris L.O.Williams & Standl.
- Petenaea Lundell
- Pityranthe Thwaites
- Pseudocorchorus Capuron
- Schoutenia Korth.
- Sicrea (Pierre) Hallier f.
- Sparrmannia L.f.
- Tetralix Griseb.
- Tilia L.
- Trichospermum Blume
- Triumfetta L.
- Vasivaea Baill.
- Westphalina A.Robyns & Bamps
