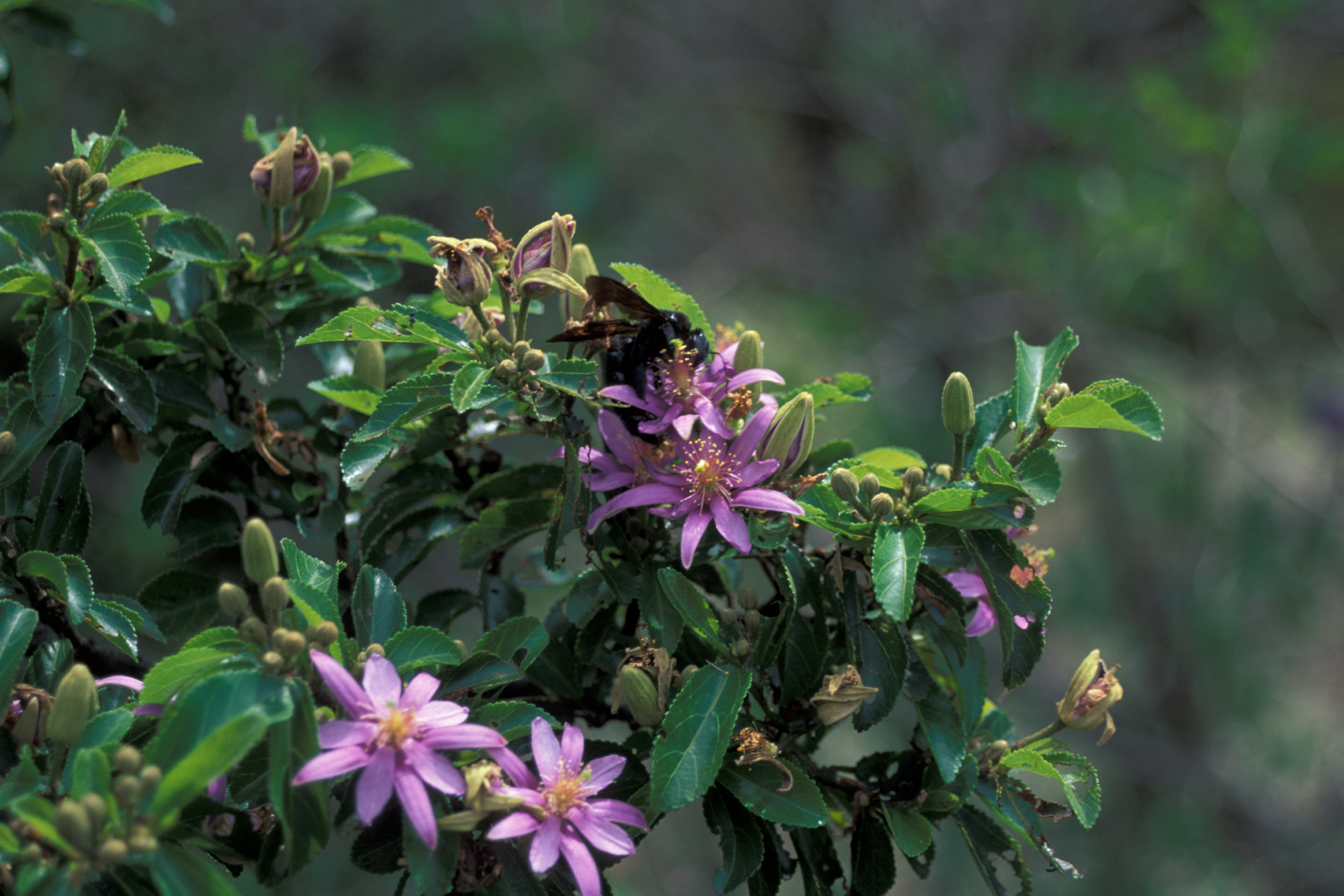
- Crossberry, Grewia occidentalis

Scientific classification
- Kingdom: Plantae
- Clade: Tracheophytes
- Clade: Angiosperms
- Clade: Eudicots
- Clade: Rosids
- Order: Malvales
- Family: Malvaceae
- Subfamily: Grewioideae; Hochr.

Genera
- See text

= Grewioideae =

Subfamily of flowering plants

Grewioideae is a subfamily of the family Malvaceae and was first described by Hochreutiner. The group is named after its type genus, Grewia, which is named for the English scientist Nehemiah Grew (1641–1712). It contains a number of genera that were previously placed in the defunct family Tiliaceae.

== Description ==
Within the Malvaceae, this subfamily has its inflorescences opposite the leaves, the corollas are usually clawed, and there is a nectar-bearing hair carpet at the base of the petals and there are numerous dithecal stamens. The fruit is fleshy or capsular with spines, and the seeds are winged. The group is thought to have originated about 42 (± 15) million years ago.

== Taxonomy ==
Ulrike Brunken & Alexandra Muellner divide the Grewioideae into two clades, the Grewia Tribe (taxonomy), Grewieae Endl. and the Apeiba Tribe (taxonomy), Apeibeae Benth., on the basis of morphological and molecular evidence.

=== Tribes and genera ===
The subfamily includes the following genera - accepted by Bayer & Kubitzki (2003)

- Apeibeae Benth.
  - Ancistrocarpus Oliv.
  - Apeiba Aubl.
  - Clappertonia Meisn.
  - Corchorus L.
  - Entelea R.Br.
  - Erinocarpus Nimmo ex J.Graham
  - Glyphaea Hook.f.
  - Heliocarpus L.
  - Pseudocorchorus Capuron
  - Sparrmannia L.f.
  - Triumfetta Plum. ex L.
- Grewieae Endl.
  - Colona Cav.
  - Desplatsia Bocq.
  - Duboscia Bocq.
  - Eleutherostylis Burret
  - Goethalsia Pittier
  - Grewia L.
  - Hydrogaster Kuhlm.
  - Luehea Willd.
  - Lueheopsis Burret
  - Microcos Burm. ex L.
  - Mollia Mart.
  - Tetralix Griseb.
  - Trichospermum Blume
  - Vasivaea Baill.
