= Grewia milleri =

Conservation status
- Vulnerable (IUCN 3.1)

Scientific classification
- Kingdom: Plantae
- Clade: Tracheophytes
- Clade: Angiosperms
- Clade: Eudicots
- Clade: Rosids
- Order: Malvales
- Family: Malvaceae
- Genus: Grewia
- Species: G. milleri

Binomial name
- Grewia milleri S.Abedin

Species of flowering plant

Grewia milleri is a species of flowering plant in the Malvaceae sensu lato or Tiliaceae or Sparrmanniaceae family. It is found only in Yemen. Its natural habitat is rocky areas.
