= Prothysana terminalis =

Scientific classification
- Kingdom: Animalia
- Phylum: Arthropoda
- Class: Insecta
- Order: Lepidoptera
- Family: Apatelodidae
- Genus: Prothysana
- Species: P. terminalis

Binomial name
- Prothysana terminalis Walker, 1855

Synonyms
- Mimallo trilunula Herrich-Schäffer, [1856]; Compsa saturata Walker, 1862; Zolessia saturata; Zolessia trilunula

Species of moth

Prothysana terminalis is a moth in the family Apatelodidae whose larvae are known as shag-carpet caterpillars. The species was first described by Francis Walker in 1855. It is found in South America.

== Taxonomy ==
Vitor Osmar Becker included Compsa saturata and Mimallo trilunula as synonyms of Prothysana terminalis in 2001, but excluded Prothysana felderi from this synonymy, retaining it as a separate species. As of Kitching 2018, genus Prothysana is placed in family Apatelodidae.

== Biology ==
Recorded food plants for the two species of Prothysana (which cannot be distinguished from one another) include Philodendron, Heliconia, Welfia georgii, Chamaedora tepejilote, Piptocarpha poeppigiana, Pentaclethra macroloba, Stigmaphyllon lindinianum, Piper colonense, Piper hispidum, Piper auretum, Piper peltata, Neea psychotroides, Lycianthes synanthera, Heliocarpus appendiculatus, Miriocarpa longipes and Aegifila falcata.
