= H. americanus =

H. americanus may refer to:

- Habronattus americanus, a spider species
- Halictophagus americanus, a strepsipteran species
- Heliocarpus americanus, a tree species
- Hemitripterus americanus, a fish species
- Homarus americanus, a lobster species
- Humulus americanus, a flowering plant species

== See also ==
- Americanus (disambiguation)
