= Henri Théophile Bocquillon =

French botanist

- Born: 5 June 1834; Crugny
- Died: 15 May 1884 (aged 49); Paris
- Occupation: botanist

Henri Théophile Bocquillon (5 June 1834, Crugny – 15 May 1884, Paris) was a French botanist.

In Paris, he successively worked as an instructor at the Lycée Napoleon (from 1858), Lycée Louis-le-Grand (from 1862), Lycée Henri-IV (from 1864) and Lycée Fontanes (from 1867). At the latter two schools he served as chair of natural sciences.

In 1862 he obtained his doctorate in natural sciences, and in 1866, he received his medical doctorate. In 1869 he became an associate professor to the faculty of medicine at Paris. He was a member of the Société botanique de France and a chevalier of the Légion d'honneur.

He was the taxonomic authority of the genera Baillonia, Duboscia and Desplatsia.

== Selected works ==
- Revue du groupe des Verbénacées, 1861 – On the plant family Verbenaceae.
- Mémoire sur le groupe des Tiliacées, 1867 – On the plant family Tiliaceae.
- Anatomie et physiologie des organes reproducteurs des champignons et des lichens, 1869 – Anatomy and physiology involving the reproductive organs of fungi and lichens.
- Manuel d'histoire naturelle médicale, 1871 – Manual of medical natural history.
