= Tarchon (disambiguation) =

Tarchon may refer to:

- Tarchon the Elder, legendary founder of Tarquinii and the Etrurian League
- Tarchon the Younger, antagonist of Aeneas
- Tarchon, a speculative connection to the Anatolian deity Tarhun, Hurrian Teshub
- Mythical son of Hiera (mythology)
- Phoenician name for Tarragona
- A former genus name for a moth in the family Bombycidae, now Prothysana
