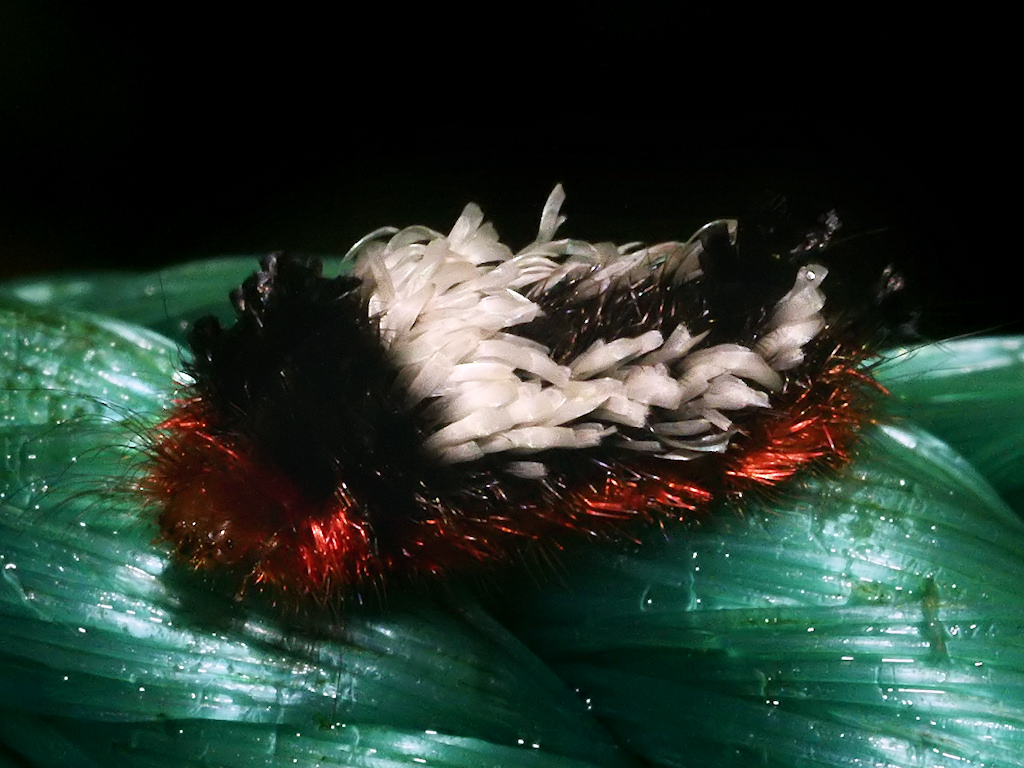

Scientific classification
- Domain: Eukaryota
- Kingdom: Animalia
- Phylum: Arthropoda
- Class: Insecta
- Order: Lepidoptera
- Family: Apatelodidae
- Genus: Prothysana
- Species: P. felderi

Binomial name
- Prothysana felderi (Druce, 1887)

Synonyms
- Tarchon felderi Druce, 1887; Zolessia felderi

= Prothysana felderi =

Species of moth

Prothysana felderi is a moth in the family Apatelodidae, whose larvae are known as shag-carpet caterpillars. It is found from Mexico, south to Panama and into South America, at least to Ecuador.

== Taxonomy ==
Vitor Osmar Becker included Compsa saturata and Mimallo trilunula as synonyms of Prothysana terminalis in 2001, but excluded Prothysana felderi from this synonymy, retaining it as a separate species. Kitching et al. 2018 places the genus in family Apatelodidae.

== Biology ==
Recorded food plants for the two species of Prothysana (whose larvae cannot be distinguished from one another) include Philodendron, Heliconia, Welfia georgii, Chamaedora tepejilote, Piptocarpha poeppigiana, Pentaclethra macroloba, Stigmaphyllon lindinianum, Piper colonense, Piper hispidum, Piper auretum, Piper peltata, Neea psychotroides, Lycianthes synanthera, Heliocarpus appendiculatus, Miriocarpa longipes and Aegifila falcata.
