= Goethalsia =

Goethalsia may refer to:

- Goethalsia (bird), a formerly recognized genus of birds in the family Trochilidae
- Goethalsia (plant), a genus of plants in the family Malvaceae
