= Duboscia viridiflora =

Scientific classification
- Kingdom: Plantae
- Clade: Tracheophytes
- Clade: Angiosperms
- Clade: Eudicots
- Clade: Rosids
- Order: Malvales
- Family: Malvaceae
- Genus: Duboscia
- Species: D. viridiflora

Binomial name
- Duboscia viridiflora (K.Schum.) Mildbr.

Synonyms
- Diplanthemum viridiflorum K. Schum. Duboscia acuminata A. Chev.

Species of flowering plant

Duboscia viridiflora occurs from the Ivory Coast to the Democratic Republic of Congo. It is a tree which grows to 25m, and often has a deeply fluted trunk. The leaves and young stems are covered in sparse, stellate hairs. The flowers are pale green-white, with bracts below. The fruits are ribbed and very fibrous.

The species was first described by Karl Moritz Schumann in 1897, where he placed it in the genus Diplanthemum. It was moved to the genus Duboscia by Gottfried Wilhelm Johannes Mildbraed in 1922. This species has often been placed as a synonym of Duboscia macrocarpa.
