= Trichospermum peekelii =

Scientific classification
- Kingdom: Plantae
- Clade: Tracheophytes
- Clade: Angiosperms
- Clade: Eudicots
- Clade: Rosids
- Order: Malvales
- Family: Malvaceae
- Genus: Trichospermum
- Species: T. peekelii

Binomial name
- Trichospermum peekelii Burret

Plant species

Trichospermum peekelii is a plant species in the family Malvaceae. It is found in the Bismarck Islands and Solomon Islands archipelagoes.

== Names ==
T. peekelii is reconstructed as *maRako in the Proto-Oceanic language, the reconstructed ancestor of the Oceanic languages.
