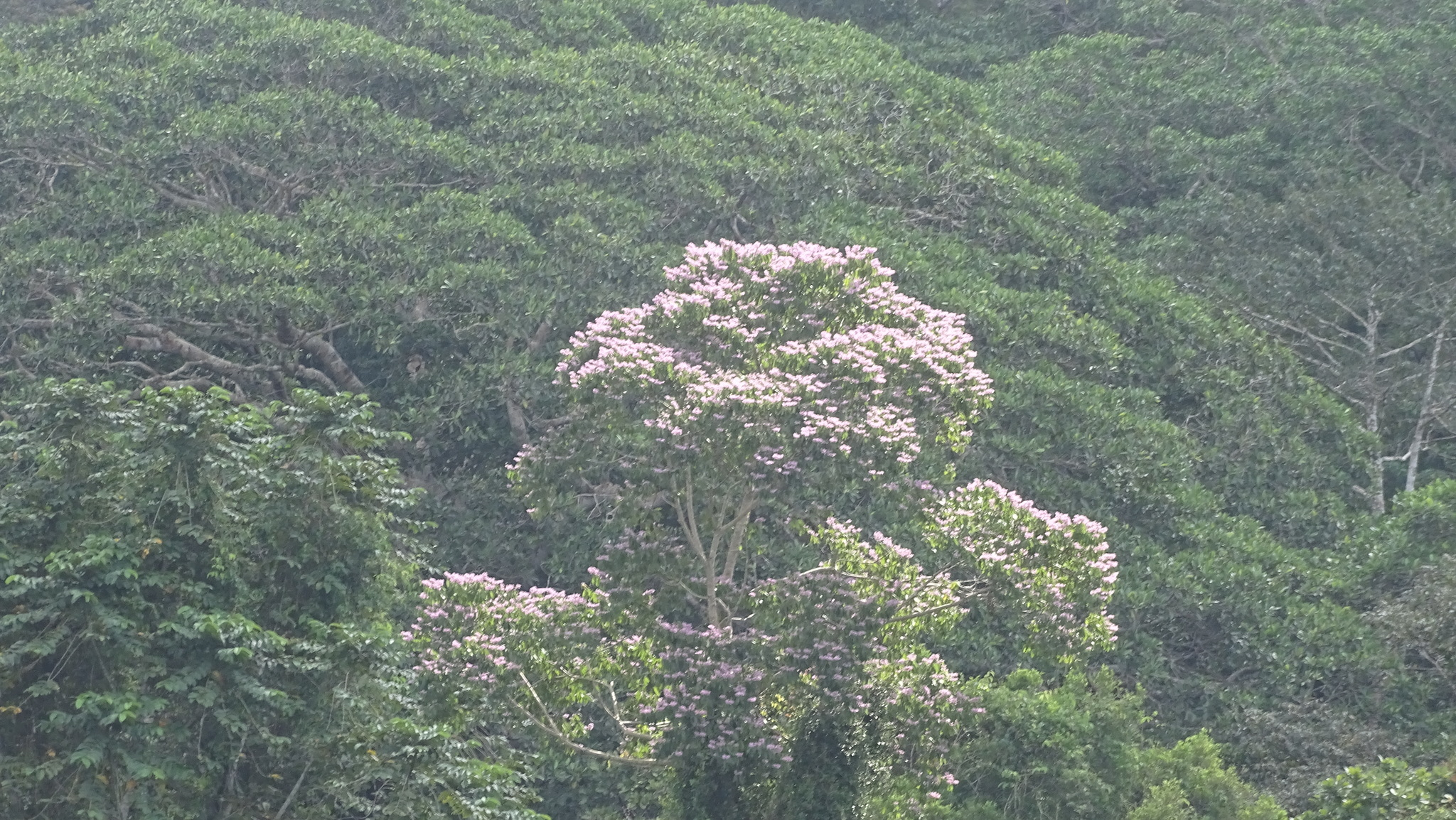

Scientific classification
- Kingdom: Plantae
- Clade: Tracheophytes
- Clade: Angiosperms
- Clade: Eudicots
- Clade: Rosids
- Order: Malvales
- Family: Malvaceae
- Genus: Trichospermum
- Species: T. galeottii

Binomial name
- Trichospermum galeottii Kostermans 1962

= Trichospermum galeottii =

Species of plants

Trichospermum galeottii is a species of flowering plant in the family Malvaceae. It was first described by Russian botanist Nikolai Turczaninow and it was given its current name by André Joseph Guillaume Henri Kostermans in 1962. Its native range spans the area between Mexico and Northwestern Venezuela and Peru.
