= Glyphaea tomentosa =

Conservation status
- Least Concern (IUCN 3.1)

Scientific classification
- Kingdom: Plantae
- Clade: Tracheophytes
- Clade: Angiosperms
- Clade: Eudicots
- Clade: Rosids
- Order: Malvales
- Family: Malvaceae
- Genus: Glyphaea
- Species: G. tomentosa

Binomial name
- Glyphaea tomentosa Mast.

Synonyms
- Homotypic Synonyms: Schweinfurthafra tomentosa (Mast.) Kuntze; Heterotypic Synonyms: Oncoba sulcata Sim

Species of flowering plant

Glyphaea tomentosa is a species of flowering plant in the family Malvaceae. family. It is native to Malawi and Mozambique.
