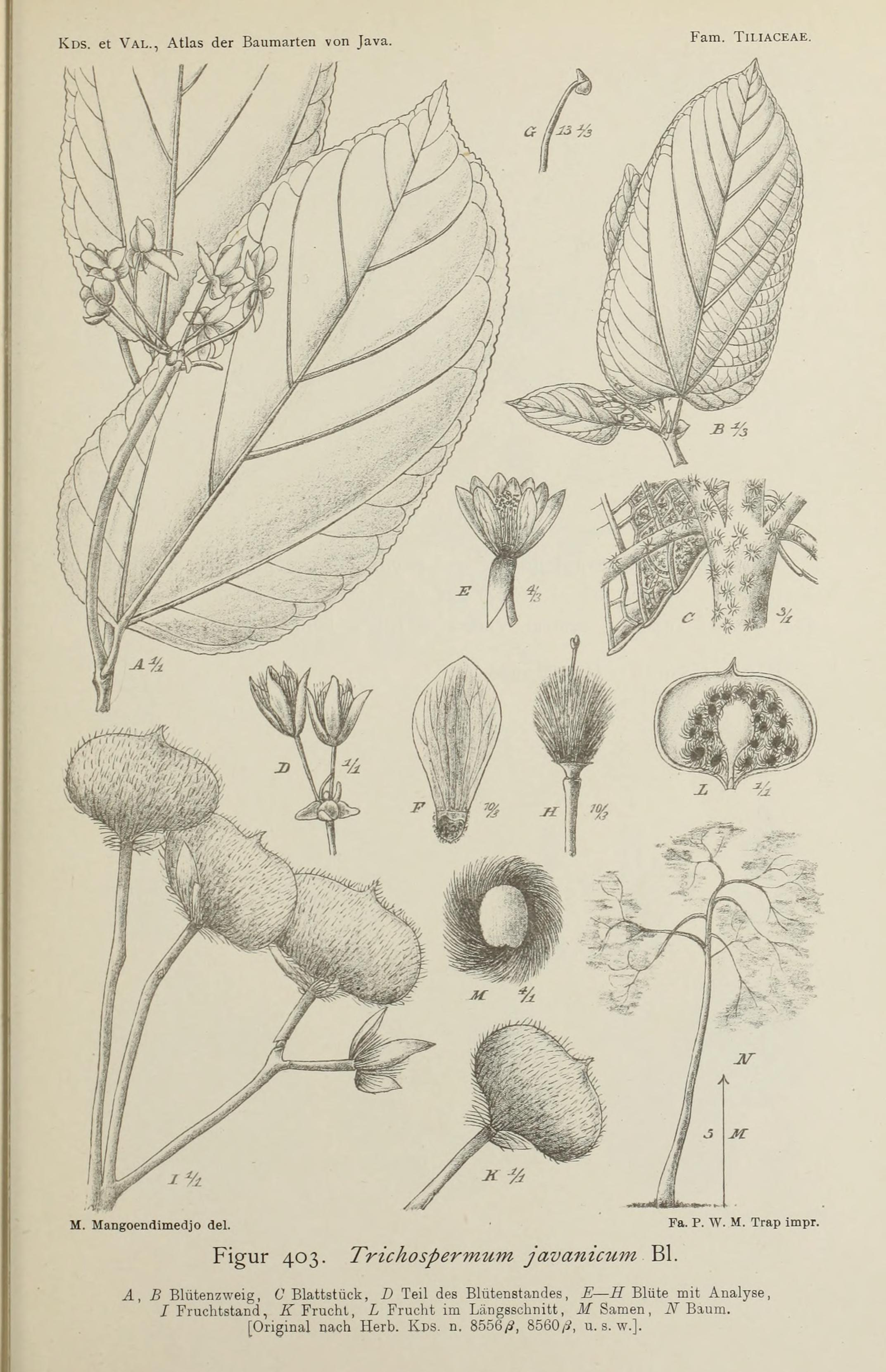
- Illustration of Trichospermum javanicum

Scientific classification
- Kingdom: Plantae
- Clade: Tracheophytes
- Clade: Angiosperms
- Clade: Eudicots
- Clade: Rosids
- Order: Malvales
- Family: Malvaceae
- Genus: Trichospermum
- Species: T. javanicum

Binomial name
- Trichospermum javanicum Blume

= Trichospermum javanicum =

Plant species

Trichospermum javanicum is a Southeast Asian plant species in the family Malvaceae. It is found in Malaysia, Indonesia, and Thailand, and is locally used for its timber.
