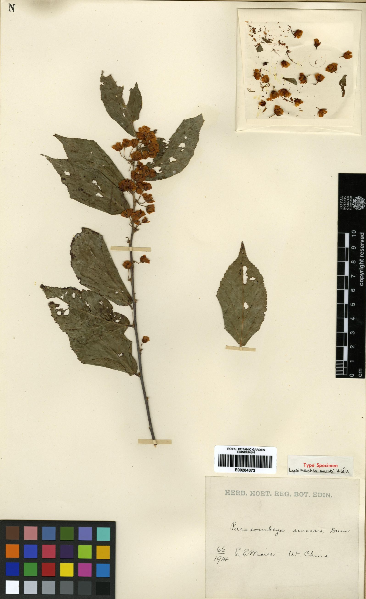

Scientific classification
- Kingdom: Plantae
- Clade: Embryophytes
- Clade: Tracheophytes
- Clade: Spermatophytes
- Clade: Angiosperms
- Clade: Eudicots
- Clade: Rosids
- Order: Malvales
- Family: Malvaceae
- Genus: Corchoropsis
- Species: C. sinensis

Binomial name
- Corchoropsis sinensis (Dunn) Dorr

Synonyms
- Paradombeya sinensis Dunn; Paradombeya szechuenica Hu; Paradombeya rehderiana Hu

= Corchoropsis sinensis =

Species of flowering plant

Corchoropsis sinensis, also known as ping dang shu (Chinese: 平当树), is a species of plant in the family Malvaceae endemic to southern China.

== Taxonomy and history ==
This species was first described under the name Paradombeya sinensis in 1902 by British botanist Stephen Troyte Dunn, with the description published in the twenty-eighth volume of Icones Plantarum. It would be transferred to the genus Corchoropsis in 2021 by American botanist Laurence Joseph Dorr on the basis of evidence obtained though molecular phylogenetic analyses.

== Distribution and habitat ==
Corchoropsis sinensis is restricted to the provinces of Sichuan and Yunnan in southern China, where it grows in scrubland on grassy slopes at altitudes of 300–1,500 m (980–4,920 ft) above sea level.

== Description ==
Corchoropsis sinensis is a shrub or small tree growing to 5 m (16 ft) tall. The slender branchlets have a sparse covering of fine stellate hairs. The leaves are ovate-lanceolate to elliptic-oblanceolate with a pointed tip and rounded base, measuring 5–12.5 cm (2.0–4.9 in) long by 1.5–5 cm (0.59–1.97 in) wide. The underside of the leaf is sparsely covered with stellate hairs, while the upper surface is mostly or entirely hairless. The leaf margin is finely serrated and the leaves are either sessile or borne on very short petioles measuring only 3–5 mm (0.12–0.20 in) long. The inflorescence is a fascicle of one to three cymes, with each cyme bearing one to six flowers on slender 1–1.5 cm (0.39–0.59 in) long pedicels. The petals are yellow and broadly obovate. The fruit is a rounded capsule measuring around 2.5 mm (0.098 in).
