= Trichospermum =

Scientific classification
- Kingdom: Plantae
- Clade: Tracheophytes
- Clade: Angiosperms
- Clade: Eudicots
- Clade: Rosids
- Order: Malvales
- Family: Malvaceae
- Subfamily: Grewioideae
- Genus: Trichospermum; Burm. ex L.

Genus of plants

Trichospermum is a genus of flowering plants in the family Malvaceae sensu lato or Tiliaceae or Sparrmanniaceae. Species are distributed in Malesia to the tropical Americas.

== Species ==
Plants of the World Online lists:

- Trichospermum arachnoideum Kosterm.
- Trichospermum burretii Kosterm.
- Trichospermum buruensis Kosterm.
- Trichospermum calyculatum (Seem.) Burret
- Trichospermum discolor Elmer
- Trichospermum eriopodum (Turcz.) Merr.
- Trichospermum fauroensis Kosterm.
- Trichospermum fletcheri Kosterm.
- Trichospermum fosbergii Kosterm.
- Trichospermum galeottii (Turcz.) Kosterm.
- Trichospermum gracile Kosterm.
- Trichospermum graciliflorum Kosterm.
- Trichospermum grewioides Kosterm.
- Trichospermum heliotrichum Kosterm.
- Trichospermum ikutae Kaneh.
- Trichospermum incaniopsis Kosterm.
- Trichospermum incanum Merr. & L.M.Perry
- Trichospermum inmac (Guillaumin) Burret
- Trichospermum involucratum (Merr.) Elmer
- Trichospermum javanicum Blume
- Trichospermum kajewskii Merr. & L.M.Perry
- Trichospermum kjellbergii Burret
- Trichospermum lanigerum Merr.
- Trichospermum ledermannii Burret
- Trichospermum lessertianum (Hochr.) Dorr
- Trichospermum mexicanum (DC.) Baill.
- Trichospermum morotaiense Kosterm.
- Trichospermum negrosense (Elmer) Elmer
- Trichospermum ovatum Kosterm.
- Trichospermum peekelii Burret
- Trichospermum pleiostigma (F.Muell.) Kosterm.
- Trichospermum pseudojavanicum Burret
- Trichospermum psilocladum Merr. & L.M.Perry
- Trichospermum quadrivalve Merr.
- Trichospermum rhamnifolium Kosterm.
- Trichospermum richii (A.Gray) Seem.
- Trichospermum sacciferum Burret
- Trichospermum samoense Burret
- Trichospermum smithii Kosterm.
- Trichospermum stevensii W.N.Takeuchi
- Trichospermum subdehiscens Kosterm.
- Trichospermum talaudensis Kosterm.
- Trichospermum tripyxis (K.Schum.) Kosterm.
