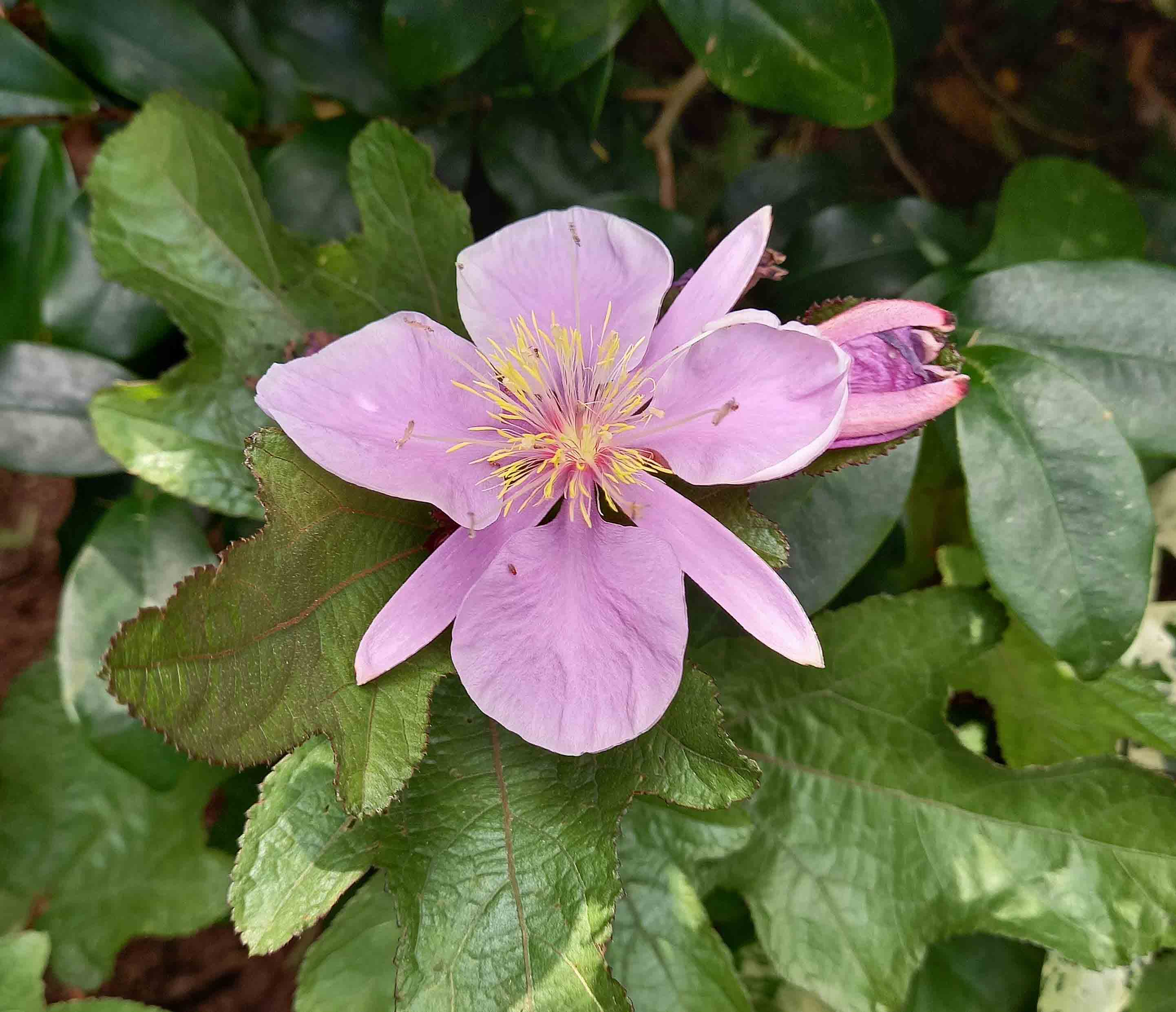

Scientific classification
- Kingdom: Plantae
- Clade: Tracheophytes
- Clade: Angiosperms
- Clade: Eudicots
- Clade: Rosids
- Order: Malvales
- Family: Malvaceae
- Genus: Clappertonia
- Species: C. ficifolia

Binomial name
- Clappertonia ficifolia (Willd.) Decne.

Synonyms
- Honkenya ficifolia Willd.; Honkenya willdenowii J.F.Gmel.

= Clappertonia ficifolia =

Species of flowering plant

Clappertonia ficifolia is a species of flowering plant belonging in the family Malvaceae.
