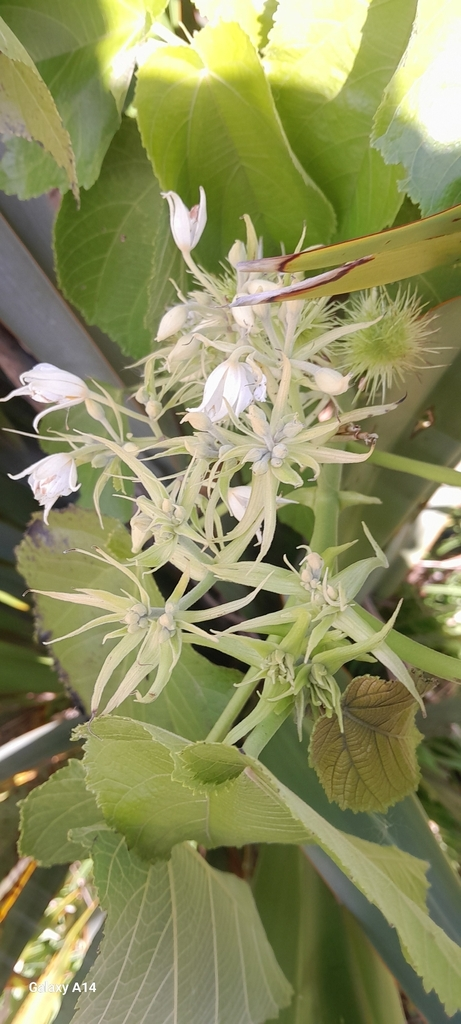

Scientific classification
- Kingdom: Plantae
- Clade: Embryophytes
- Clade: Tracheophytes
- Clade: Angiosperms
- Clade: Eudicots
- Clade: Rosids
- Order: Malvales
- Family: Malvaceae
- Subfamily: Grewioideae
- Genus: Entelea; R.Br.
- Species: E. arborescens

Binomial name
- Entelea arborescens R.Br.

Synonyms
- Synonymy: Apeiba australis A.Rich.; Corchorus sloaneoides A.Cunn. ex Turcz.; Entelea australis (A.Rich.) Walp.; Entelea bakeri W.Bull; Entelea palmata Lindl.; Entelea pubescens Sweet; Sparrmannia palmata Lindl.

= Entelea =

Whau

Genus of trees

Entelea arborescens or whau is a species of malvaceous tree endemic to New Zealand. E. arborescens is the only species in the genus Entelea. A shrub or small tree to 8 m (26 ft) with large lime-like leaves giving a tropical appearance, whau grows in low forest along the coast of the North Island and the northern tip of the South Island. The dry fruit capsules are very distinctly brown and covered with spines.

== Description ==
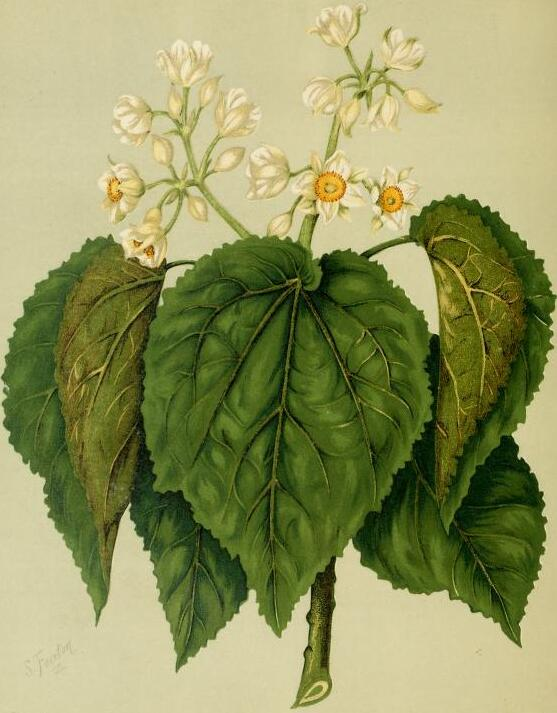
1889 botanical illustration by Sarah Featon

Entelea arborescens has alternate, stipulate foliage. The bright green, obliquely cordate leaves are large, 10–25 cm (4–10 in) long, and have from 5 to 7 nerves and long petioles. The flowers are white with yellow filaments, and are borne profusely between early spring and mid-summer. They have 4 or 5 sepals and 4 or 5 petals. They are 2 cm (0.8 in) in diameter, scented, white, with a central tuft of densely-packed yellow stamens. The brown seed capsules, which are 1.5 cm (0.6 in) long, bear 2.5 cm (1.0 in) long rigid bristles.

The tree reaches a maximum height of 8 m (26 ft).

Whau has very lightweight wood, rivalling balsa (Ochroma pyramidale) for lightness, and less dense than cork (about half the density). The pale brown wood forms several bands of unlignified pith-like parenchyma per year. This is a characteristic shared with related plants including Sparrmannia, and causes there to be no distinct growth rings in the wood.

== Taxonomy ==
Both the genus and species were first formally described in 1824 by Scottish botanist Robert Brown, based on material collected by Joseph Banks and Daniel Solander during the First voyage of James Cook in 1769.

Entelea arborescens is the sole member of the genus Entelea. Phylogenetic analysis based on ndhF DNA sequence data suggests that the genera Sparrmannia and Clappertonia within the Malvaceae subfamily Grewioideae are close relatives of the species.

== Etymology ==
The common name whau is a Māori word that appears to derive from the common Polynesian word for hibiscus, fau, particularly Hibiscus tiliaceus, which it superficially resembles. Alternate names include New Zealand mulberry, corkwood, and evergreen lime. The genus name Entelea means perfect (referring to the flowers having both male and female reproductive organs), while the species epithet means "becoming a tree".

== Distribution and habitat ==
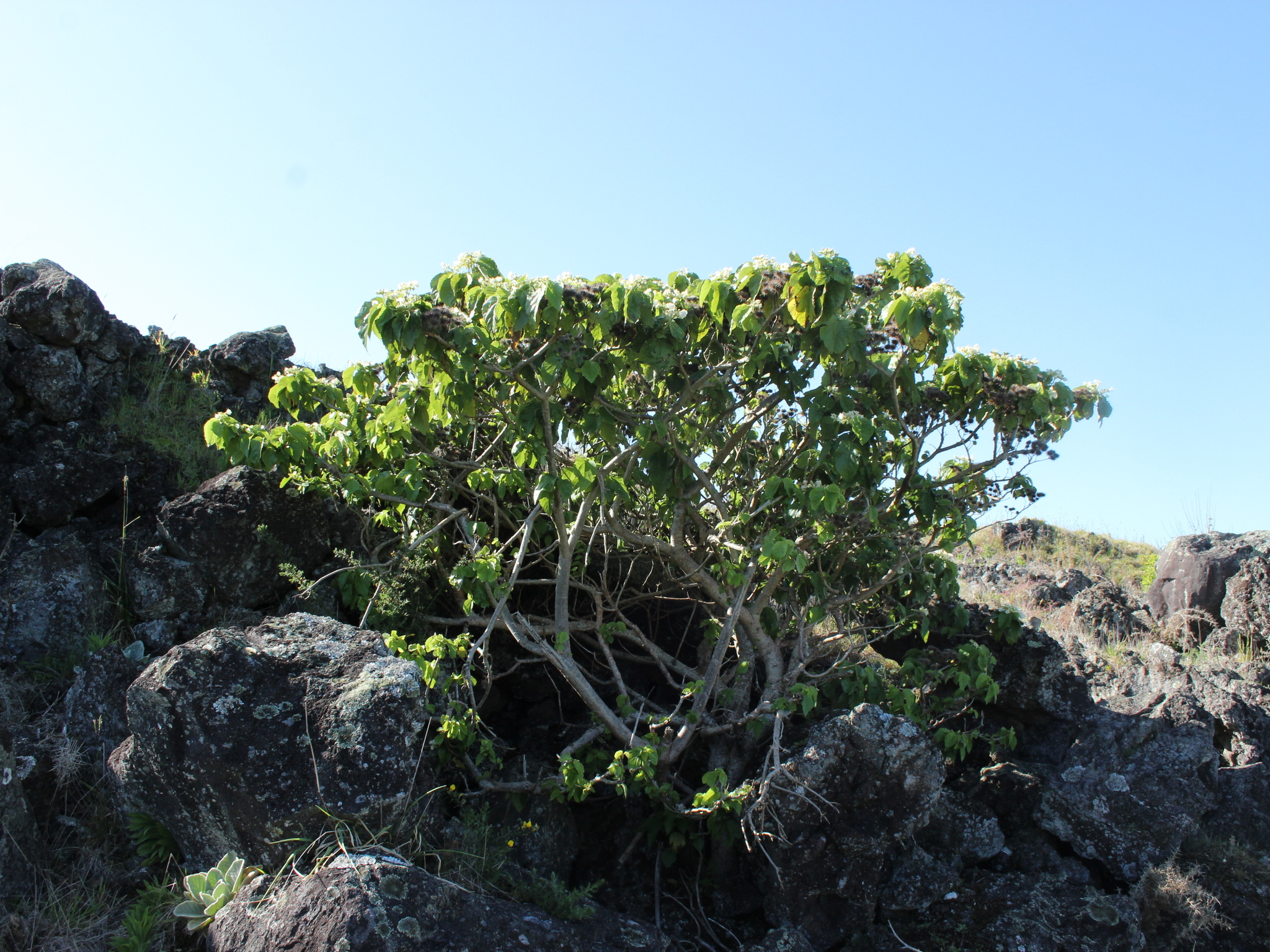
Whau growing in a rocky coastal area at Ōtuataua Stonefields, Ihumātao, near the Manukau Harbour

The species is native to New Zealand, found widely across the North Island north of the Māhia Peninsula and the Kawhia Harbour, and sparsely south of this. It is also found in the South Island around Golden Bay / Mohua and Nelson, and in Manawatāwhi / Three Kings Islands. Whau trees are also an introduced species in Ecuador.

Whau grows in coastal areas, lowland forest or shrubland. While typically found in coastal areas, it also occurs in inland areas close to the Waikato River and Rotorua. Some inland occurrences are hypothesised to be derived from deliberate plantings by Māori prior to contact with Europeans.

== Ecology ==
The species is short-lived, with individual trees typically living only fewer than 15 years. Whau seeds are long lived, and survive for extended periods of time, opportunistically growing in areas of disturbed ground.

Whau seeds can be stimulated into growth by fire after lying on the surface of the ground for many years. Having germinated, whau establishes itself with striking rapidity. In a study on Taranga (Hen Island), in favourable conditions whau was often the first new plant to appear, followed by Urtica ferox (tree nettle), Macropiper excelsum (kawakawa), Coprosma macrocarpa (coastal karamu) and Coprosma lucida (shiny karamu); forest-dominating trees were slower to come in – Corynocarpus (karaka) most quickly, followed by Beilschmiedia tawa (tawa).

== Māori cultural importance ==
In Tainui traditions, whau is explained as an altered version of aute, or the paper mulberry tree. In a traditional story, Marama, wife of waka captain Hoturoa of the Tainui was cursed due to infidelity, causing her seeds to morph into different plants: her kūmara seeds became bindweeds, and her paper mulberry seeds became whau seeds.

The wood was used by Māori to make pōito (fishing floats), kārewa (buoys) and mōkihi (rafts). Because of this, whau trees had high importance in traditional Māori culture, and were actively cultivated, in areas such as Maungawhau / Mount Eden in central Auckland, named due to the abundance of whau trees that grew on its lower slopes. Traditional nets were created using rocks to keep nets anchored to the seafloor, and whau wood as a float. Some nets seen by early European explorers were attested to being almost 2 km (1.2 mi) in length.

== Cultivation ==
Preferring a rich moist loam, whau can be grown outdoors in sun or light shade in mild climates, or in a conservatory or glasshouse in cold climates. It is intolerant of drought and is able to withstand barely 3 °C of frost. Propagation is from seed, which is available commercially. It also strikes readily from hardwood cuttings about 20–30 cm (7.9–11.8 in) long with leaves and twigs removed. Thrust deep into gritty damp soil in black planting bags and covered with a wet sack or newspaper for a week to keep moist; new leaves will appear after about three weeks. Best left a few months until strong re-growth is obvious before transplanting.

== Gallery ==
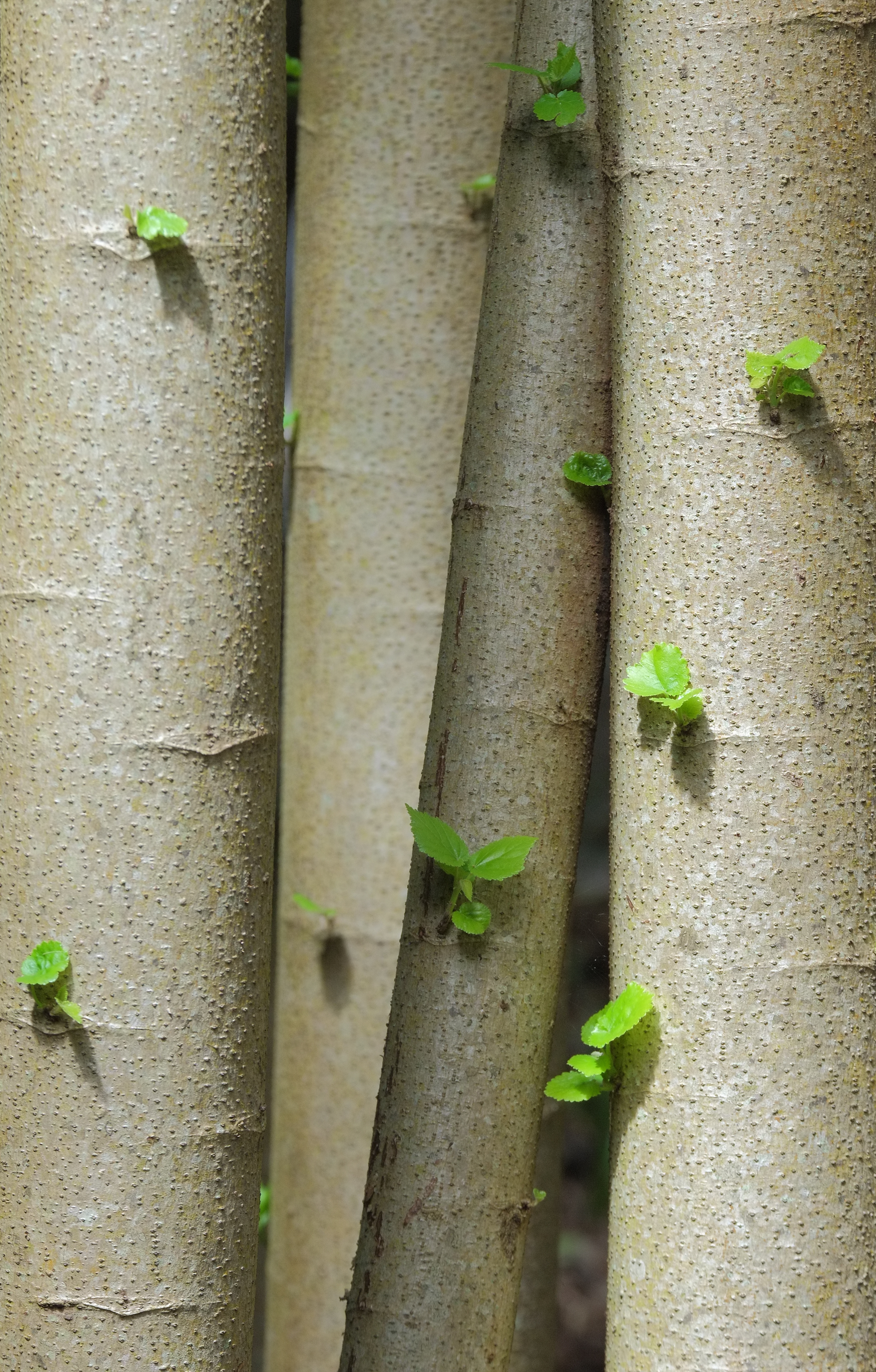
Whau trunks with epicormic shoots

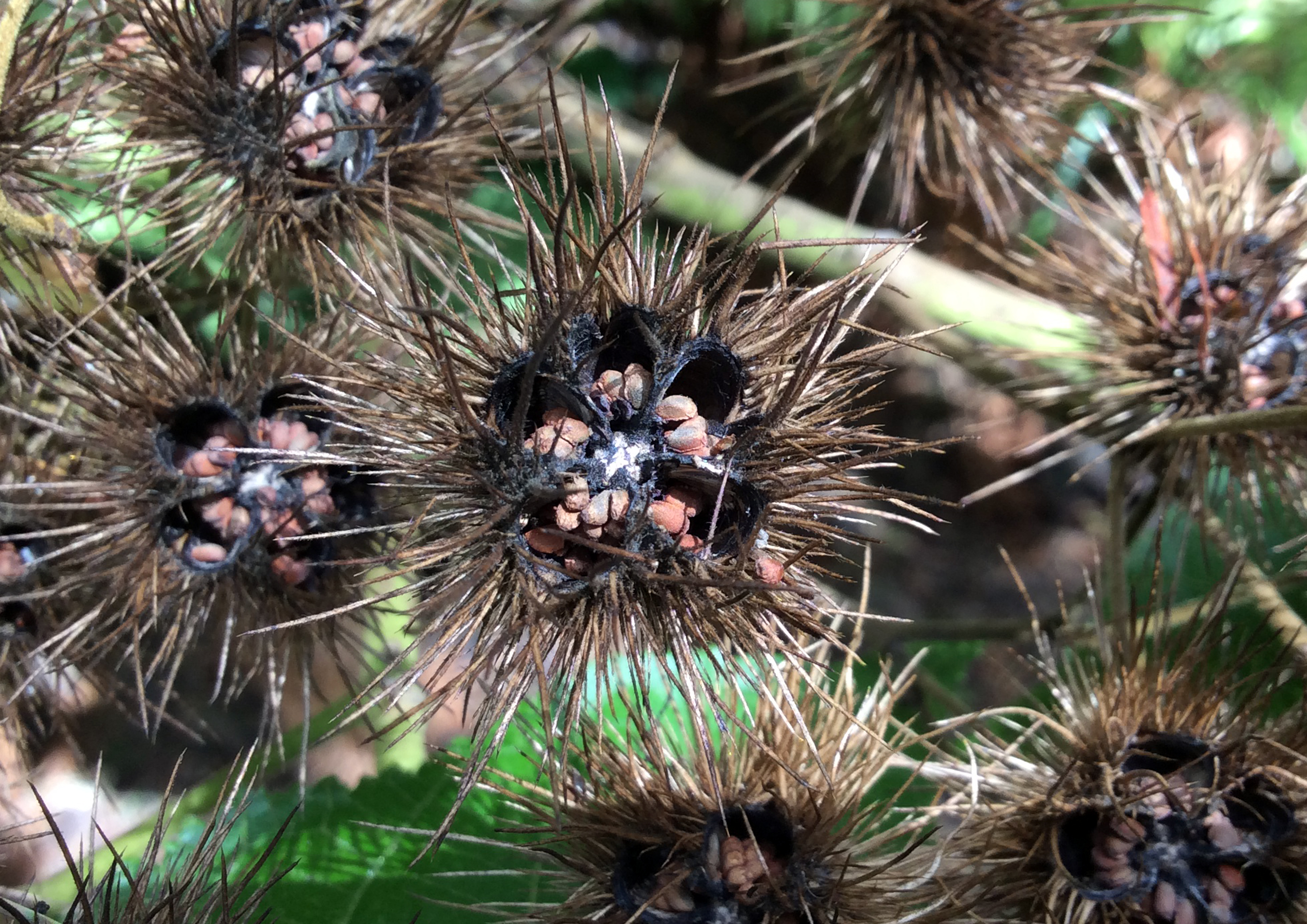
Seed pods

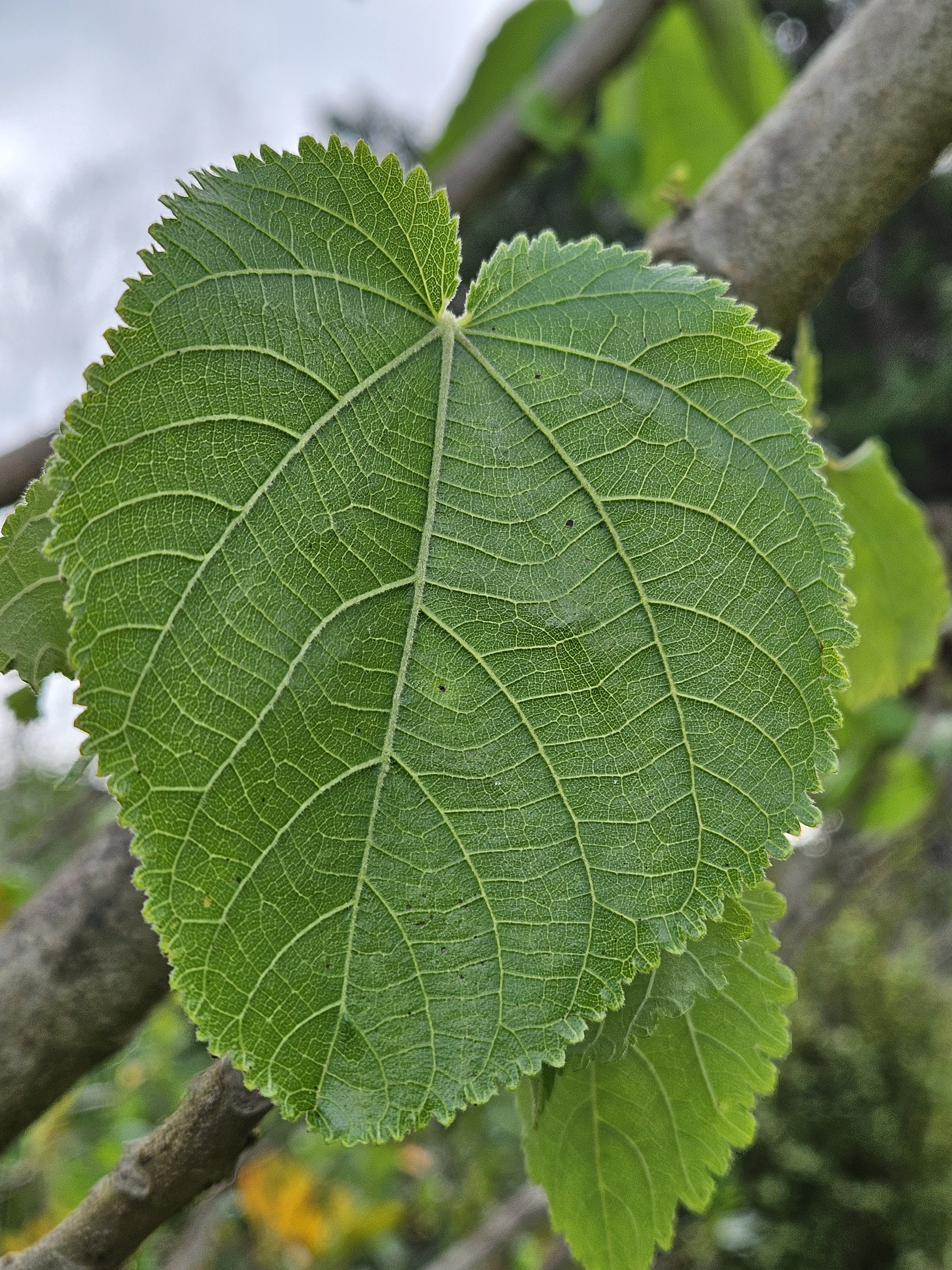
Leaf

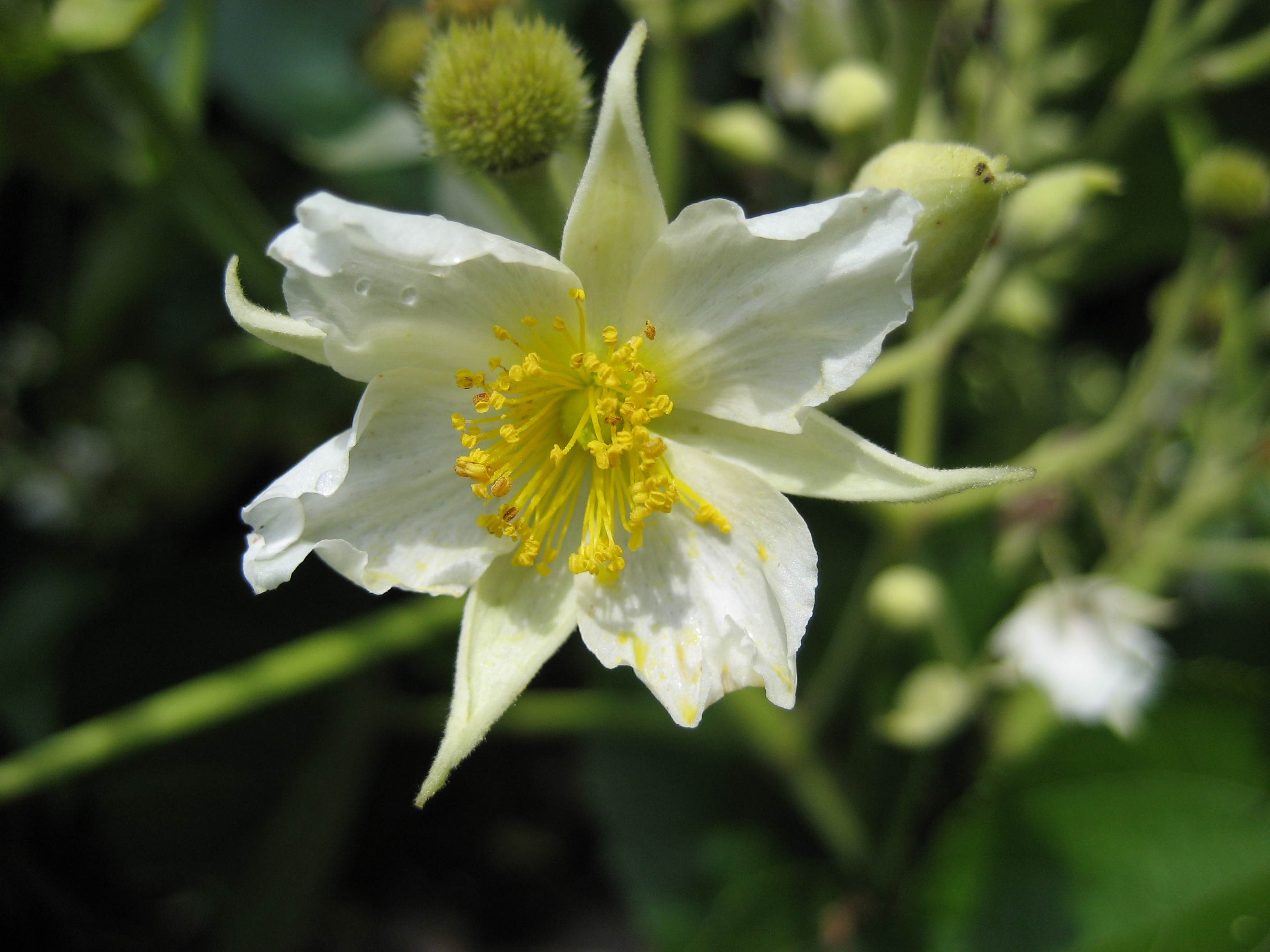
Flower

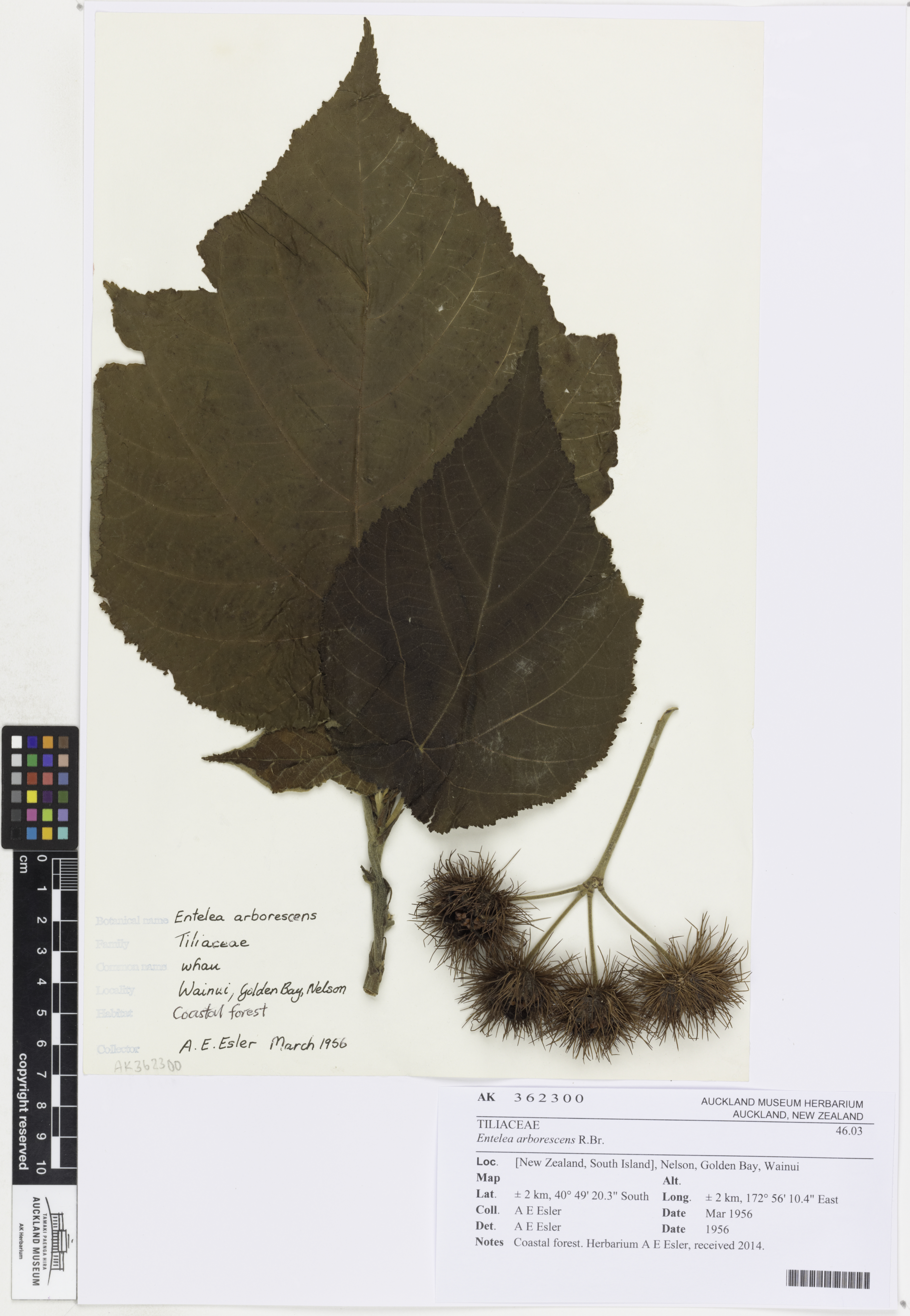
Herbarium specimen

== See also ==
The whau tree gives its name to the Whau River in Auckland, the Whau Local Board of Auckland Council, and Whau Valley, a suburb of Whangārei.
