= Duboscia macrocarpa =

Scientific classification
- Kingdom: Plantae
- Clade: Tracheophytes
- Clade: Angiosperms
- Clade: Eudicots
- Clade: Rosids
- Order: Malvales
- Family: Malvaceae
- Genus: Duboscia
- Species: D. macrocarpa

Binomial name
- Duboscia macrocarpa Bocq.

Synonyms
- Duboscia polyantha Pierre ex. A. Chev. Diplanthemum brieyi De Wild.

Species of flowering plant

Duboscia macrocarpa occurs from Nigeria to the Democratic Republic of Congo. It is a tree which grows to 30 m, and often has a fluted trunk. The leaves and young stems are covered in dense hairs. The flowers are pink-reddish brown, with bracts below. The fruits are ribbed and very fibrous.

The species was first described by Henri Théophile Bocquillon in 1866.
