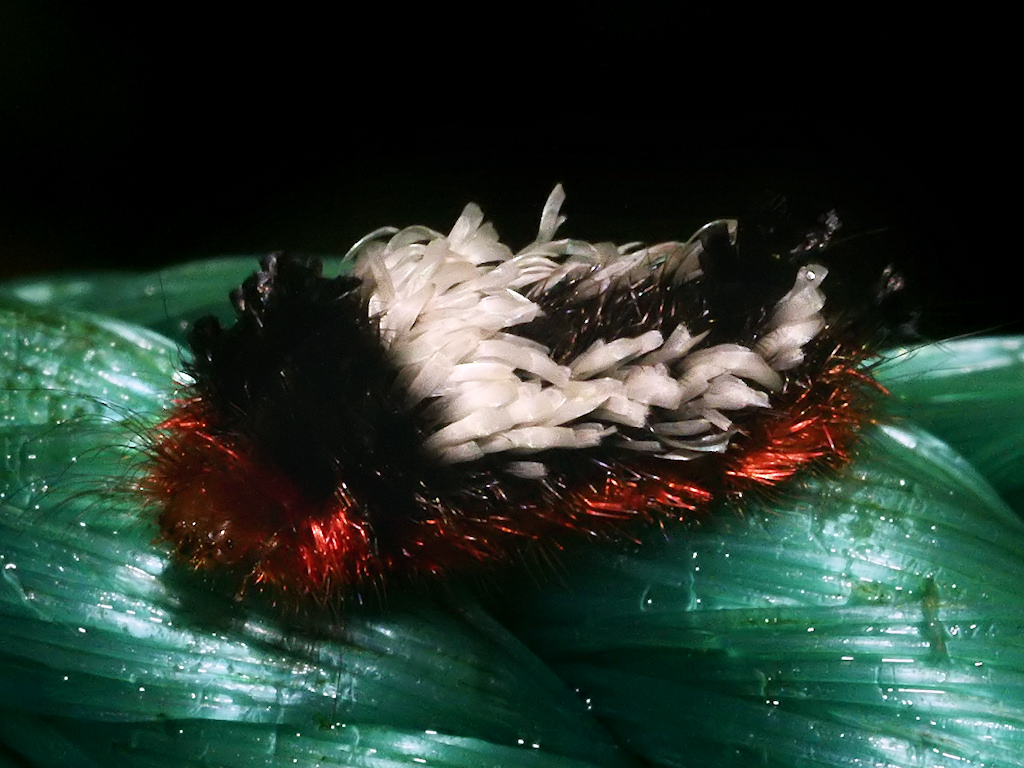
- Prothysana felderi larva

Scientific classification
- Kingdom: Animalia
- Phylum: Arthropoda
- Class: Insecta
- Order: Lepidoptera
- Family: Apatelodidae
- Genus: Prothysana; Walker, 1855

Species
- Prothysana felderi (Druce, 1887); Prothysana terminalis Walker, 1855

Synonyms
- Compsa Walker, 1862 (preocc. Compsa Perty, 1832); Mesotages Felder, 1874 (preocc. Mesotages Foerster, 1862); Tarchon Druce, 1887 (repl. for Mesotages Felder); Zolessia Biezanko & Monné, 1968

= Prothysana =

Genus of moths

Prothysana is a genus of moths of the family Apatelodidae. It contains two species, whose larvae are known as shag-carpet caterpillars. They are found from Mexico, south to Panama and into South America, at least to Ecuador.

== Taxonomy ==
Vitor Osmar Becker included Compsa Walker, 1862, Mesotages Felder, 1874, Tarchon Druce, 1887 and Zolessia Biezanko & Monné, 1968 as new synonyms of Prothysana in 2001, and placed Compsa saturata and Mimallo trilunula as synonyms of Prothysana terminalis in 2001, but excluded Prothysana felderi from this synonymy, retaining it as a separate species. Per Kitching et al. 2018, the genus is placed in family Apatelodidae.

== Biology ==
Recorded food plants include Philodendron, Heliconia, Welfia georgii, Chamaedora tepejilote, Piptocarpha poeppigiana, Pentaclethra macroloba, Stigmaphyllon lindinianum, Piper colonense, Piper hispidum, Piper auretum, Piper peltata, Neea psychotroides, Lycianthes synanthera, Heliocarpus appendiculatus, Miriocarpa longipes and Aegifila falcata.
