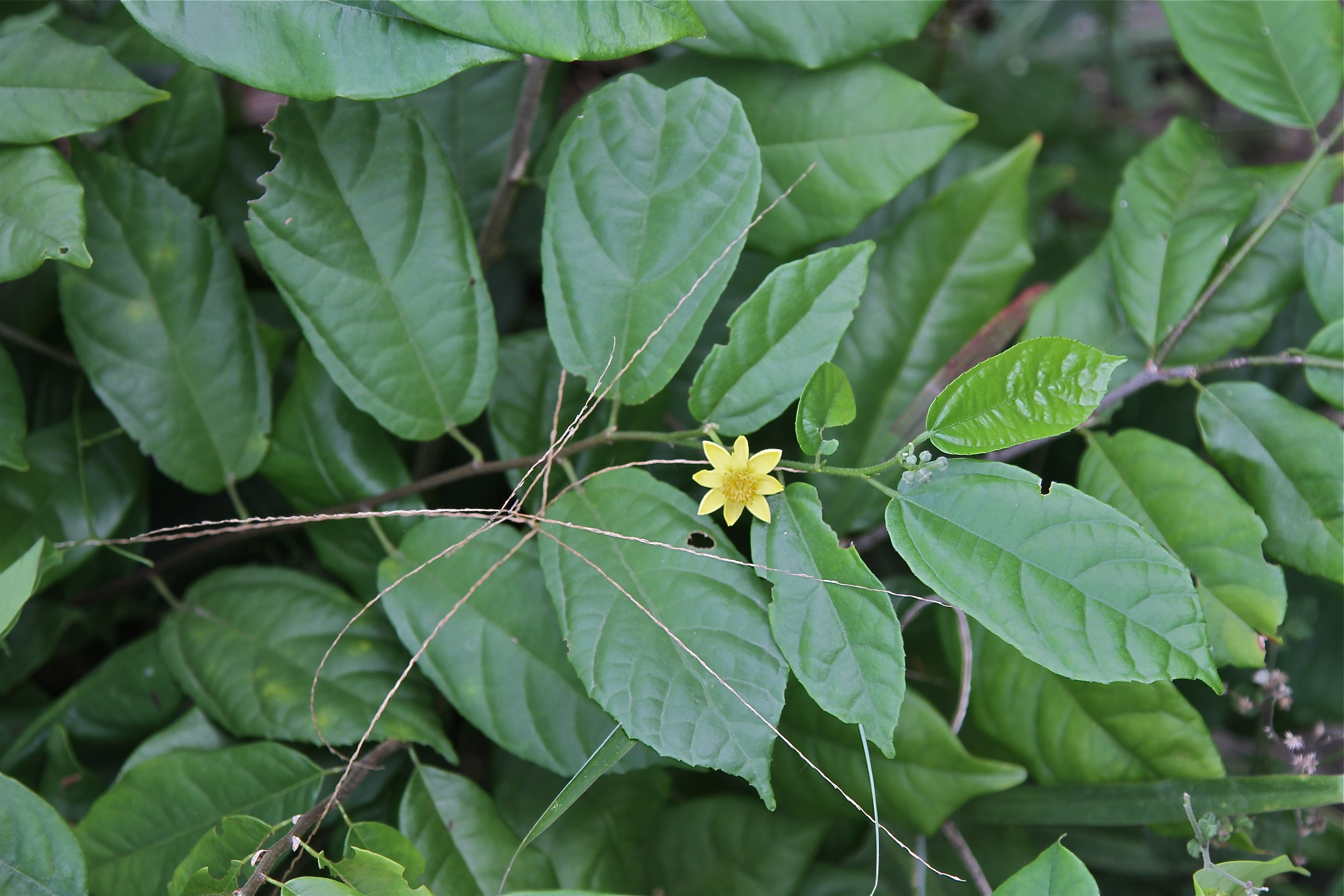
- Glyphaea brevis

Scientific classification
- Kingdom: Plantae
- Clade: Tracheophytes
- Clade: Angiosperms
- Clade: Eudicots
- Clade: Rosids
- Order: Malvales
- Family: Malvaceae
- Subfamily: Grewioideae
- Genus: Glyphaea; Hook.f.

Synonyms
- Schweinfurthafra Kuntze

= Glyphaea =

Genus of flowering plants

Glyphaea is a genus of African flowering plants in the family Malvaceae, which includes two species of shrubs or trees native to tropical Africa. It belongs to subfamily Grewioideae; it was previously placed in the Tiliaceae or Sparrmanniaceae.

It contains the following species:

- Glyphaea brevis (Biehler) Monach.
- Glyphaea tomentosa Mast.
