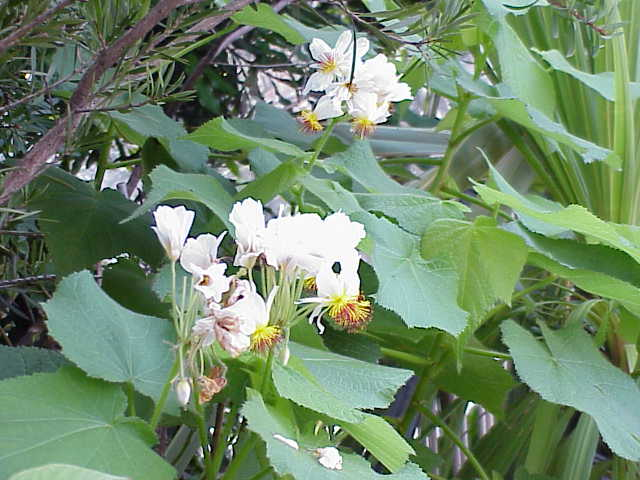

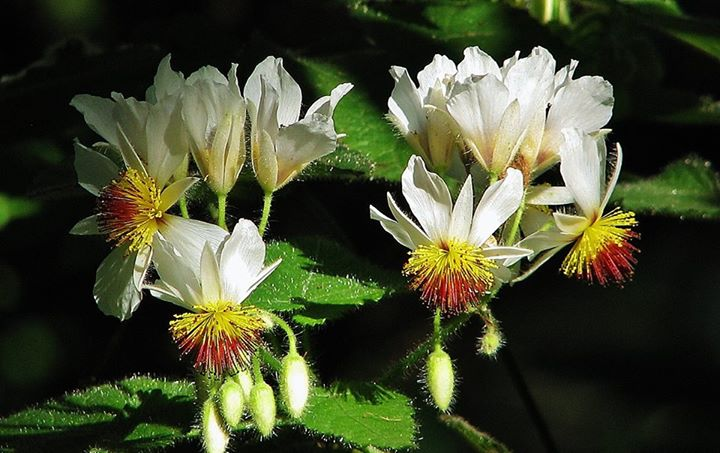

Scientific classification
- Kingdom: Plantae
- Clade: Tracheophytes
- Clade: Angiosperms
- Clade: Eudicots
- Clade: Rosids
- Order: Malvales
- Family: Malvaceae
- Genus: Sparrmannia
- Species: S. africana

Binomial name
- Sparrmannia africana L.f.

= Sparrmannia africana =

Species of flowering plant

Sparrmannia africana, the African hemp or African linden, is a species of flowering plant in the mallow family Malvaceae, native to open woodland in South Africa and Madagascar. It is one of up to seven species in the genus Sparrmannia. The genus name is after Anders Sparrman.

Growing to 3–6 m (10–20 ft) tall by 2–4 m (7–13 ft) broad, S. africana is an evergreen shrub or small tree with large pale green leaves 21 cm (8 in) long and clusters of white flowers with red and yellow stamens. It is not closely related to the true hemp, cannabis.

Sparrmannia species are known for their haptonasty, rapid movements made by the stamens when they are touched. This adaptation helps in more effective pollination.

With a minimum temperature of 7 °C (45 °F), Sparrmannia africana is grown as a houseplant in temperate climates. It has gained the Royal Horticultural Society's Award of Garden Merit.

The name Sparmannia acerifolia hort. ex Steud., with a mis-spelled generic name – an "orthographic variant" – was in the past used for this species.

== See also ==
- List of Southern African indigenous trees
