= Crugny =

- Commune
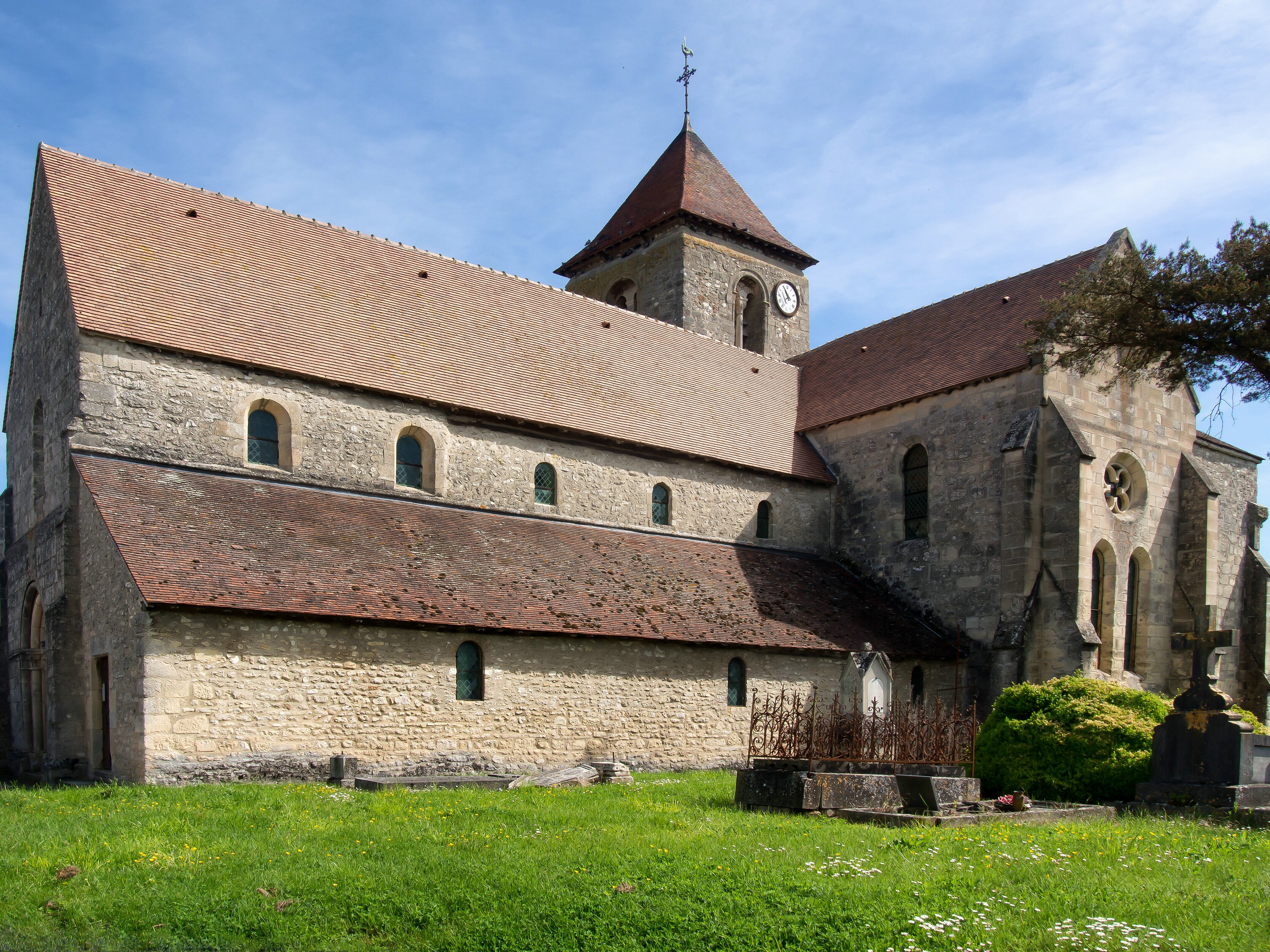
- The church in Crugny
- Location of Crugny
- Location within France Location within Grand Est
- Coordinates: 49°15′18″N 3°44′23″E
- Country: France
- Region: Grand Est
- Department: Marne
- Arrondissement: Reims
- Canton: Fismes-Montagne de Reims
- Intercommunality: CU Grand Reims

Government
  - Mayor (2020–2026): Philippe Salmon
- Area^{1}: 12.46 km^{2} (4.81 sq mi)
- Elevation: 80 m (260 ft)
- Population (2023): 675
  - Density: 54.2/km^{2} (140/sq mi)
- Time zone: UTC+01:00 (CET)
  - Summer (DST): UTC+02:00 (CEST)
- INSEE/Postal code: 51198 /51170
- ^{1} French Land Register data, which excludes lakes, ponds, glaciers > 1 km^{2} (0.386 sq mi or 247 acres) and river estuaries.

Crugny (French pronunciation: [kʁyɲi]) is a commune in the Marne department in north-eastern France.

== See also ==
- Communes of the Marne department

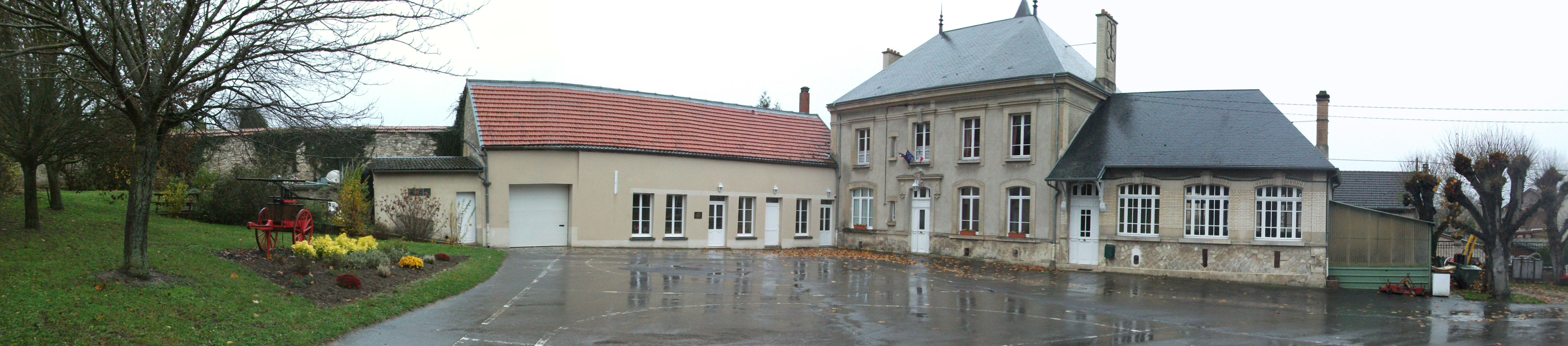
