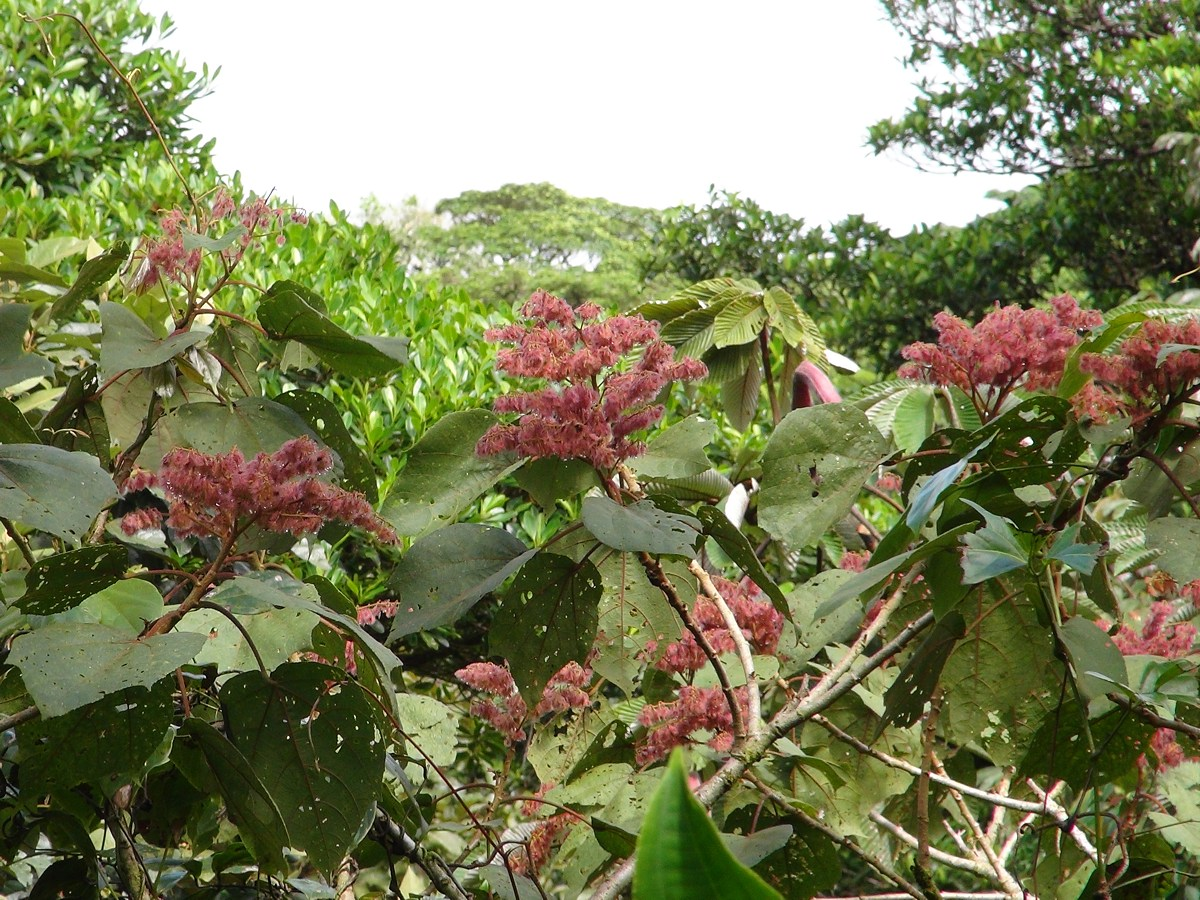
- Heliocarpus sp.

Scientific classification
- Kingdom: Plantae
- Clade: Tracheophytes
- Clade: Angiosperms
- Clade: Eudicots
- Clade: Rosids
- Order: Malvales
- Family: Malvaceae
- Subfamily: Grewioideae
- Genus: Heliocarpus; L.

Synonyms
- Montia Mill. in Gard. Dict. Abr. ed. 4.: s.p. (1754), nom. illeg.

= Heliocarpus =

Genus of flowering plants

Heliocarpus is a genus of flowering plants in the family Malvaceae. It was formerly classified in the Tiliaceae.

It was first published in Linnaeus's book Species Plantarum on page 448 in 1753.

The native range of this genus stretches from Mexico to southern Tropical America and the island of Trinidad. It is found in the countries of Argentina, Belize, Bolivia, Brazil, Colombia, Costa Rica, Ecuador, El Salvador, Guatemala, Honduras, Mexico, Nicaragua, Panamá, Paraguay, Peru, Trinidad, Tobago, and Venezuela.

== Species ==
According to Plants of the World Online (Kew) it contains;

- Heliocarpus americanus L.
- Heliocarpus appendiculatus Turcz.
- Heliocarpus attenuatus S.Watson
- Heliocarpus donnellsmithii Rose
- Heliocarpus mexicanus (Turcz.) Sprague
- Heliocarpus nodiflorus (Donn.Sm.) Donn.Sm. & Rose
- Heliocarpus occidentalis Rose
- Heliocarpus pallidus Rose
- Heliocarpus palmeri S.Watson
- Heliocarpus parvimontis Gual
- Heliocarpus terebinthaceus (DC.) Hochr.
- Heliocarpus velutinus Rose

GRIN only lists Heliocarpus americanus L.

== Ecology ==
In Veracruz in Mexico, a species of rust fungus Pucciniosira pallidula (Speg.) Henn. (1896) infects Heliocarpus donnellsmithii Rose.
