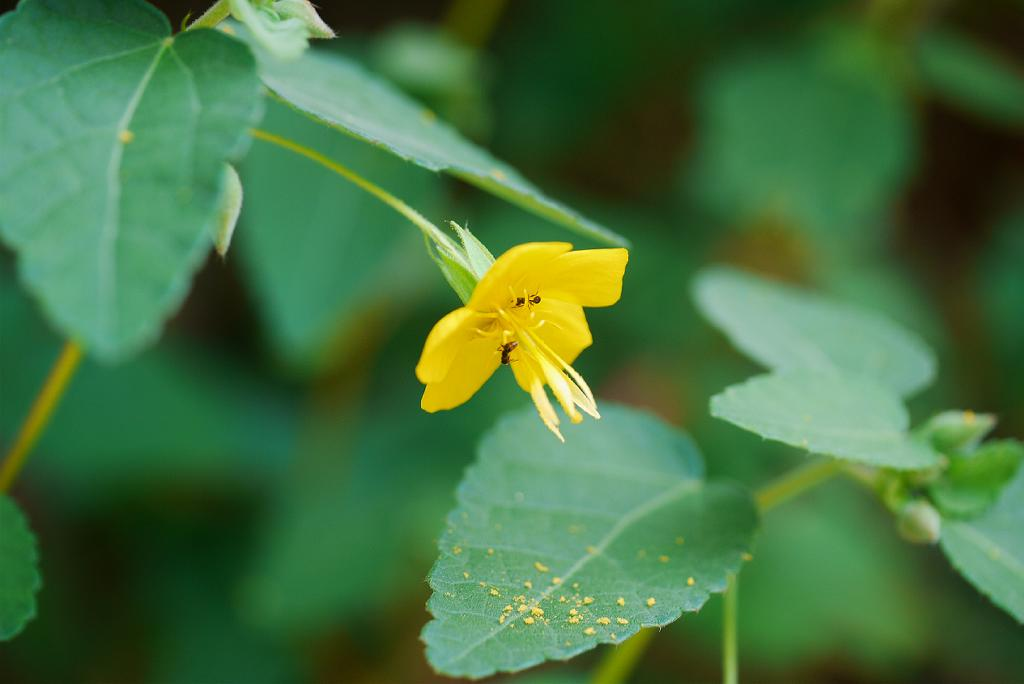
- Corchoropsis crenata

Scientific classification
- Kingdom: Plantae
- Clade: Embryophytes
- Clade: Tracheophytes
- Clade: Spermatophytes
- Clade: Angiosperms
- Clade: Eudicots
- Clade: Rosids
- Order: Malvales
- Family: Malvaceae
- Genus: Corchoropsis; Siebold & Zucc. (1843)

Synonyms
- Paradombeya Stapf (1902)

= Corchoropsis =

Genus of flowering plants

Corchoropsis is a genus of flowering plants belonging to the family Malvaceae. It contains three species native to eastern Asia, which range from Myanmar and Thailand through China to Korea and Japan. Two species, C. burmanica and C. sinensis, are shrubs or small trees, and C. crenata is an annual.

== Species ==
Three species are accepted:

- Corchoropsis burmanica (Stapf) Dorr
- Corchoropsis crenata Siebold & Zucc.
- Corchoropsis sinensis (Dunn) Dorr
