= Duboscia =

Scientific classification
- Kingdom: Plantae
- Clade: Tracheophytes
- Clade: Angiosperms
- Clade: Eudicots
- Clade: Rosids
- Order: Malvales
- Family: Malvaceae
- Subfamily: Grewioideae
- Genus: Duboscia; Bocq.

Species
- Duboscia macrocarpa Bocq.; Duboscia viridiflora (K. Schum) Mildbr.

Synonyms
- Diplanthemum K.Schum.

Genus of flowering plants

Duboscia is a small plant genus, with two species, in the family Malvaceae. The genus occurs in western and west-central tropical Africa from Guinea to the Democratic Republic of the Congo. The genus was previously in the Tiliaceae, under the APG classification it is now placed in the Malvaceae.

The genus was first described by Henri Théophile Bocquillon in 1866.
