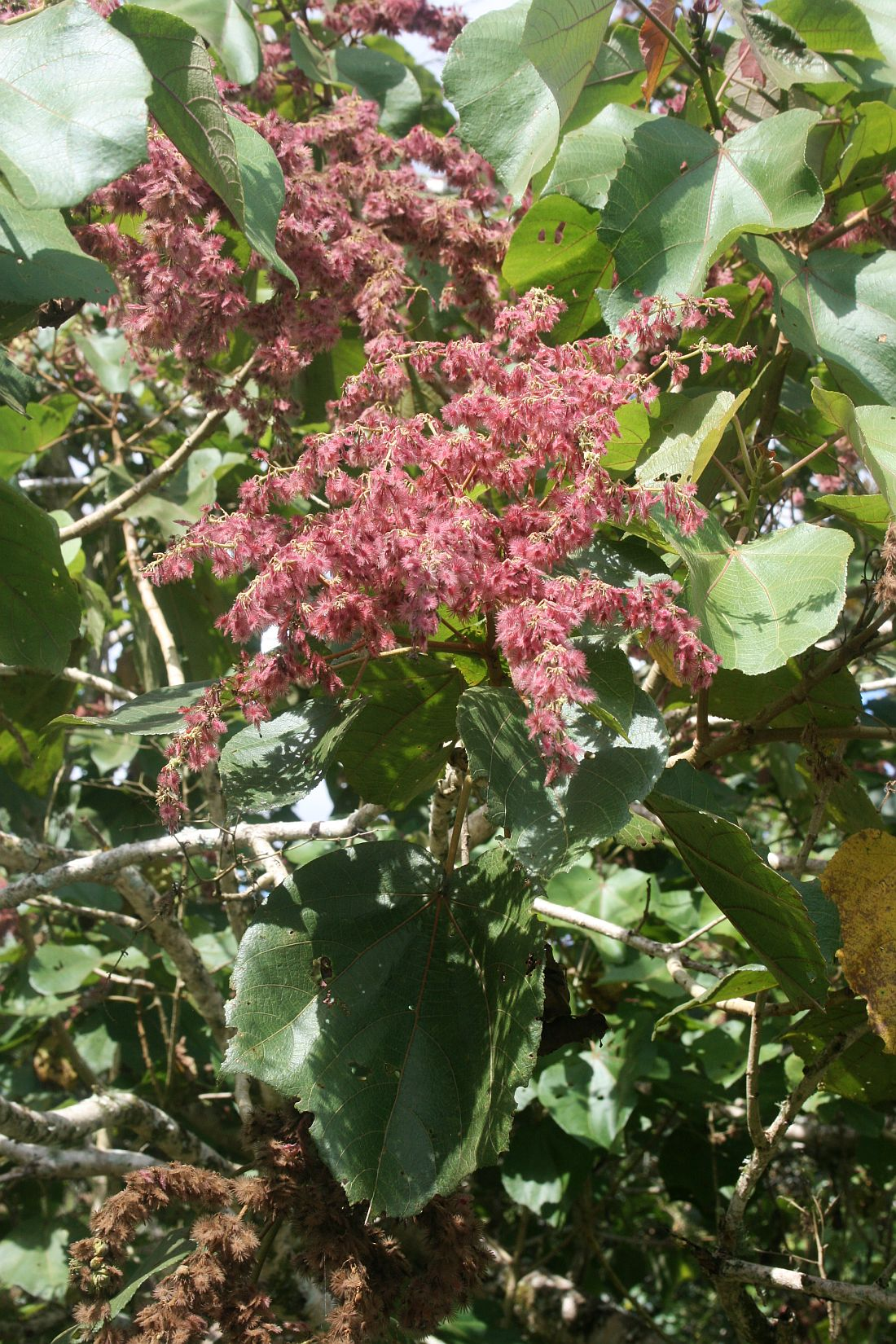

Conservation status
- Least Concern (IUCN 3.1)

Scientific classification
- Kingdom: Plantae
- Clade: Tracheophytes
- Clade: Angiosperms
- Clade: Eudicots
- Clade: Rosids
- Order: Malvales
- Family: Malvaceae
- Genus: Heliocarpus
- Species: H. americanus

Binomial name
- Heliocarpus americanus L.

= Heliocarpus americanus =

Species of tree

Heliocarpus americanus is a tropical tree native to Central America, and native throughout Mexico. It is sometimes called majaguillo or majagua. It is found in montane forest in Costa Rica and Panama at altitudes of 1,300–1,500 metres (4,300–4,900 ft). It bears pinkish-brown flowers in December and January.
