= Lueheopsis =

Scientific classification
- Kingdom: Plantae
- Clade: Embryophytes
- Clade: Tracheophytes
- Clade: Spermatophytes
- Clade: Angiosperms
- Clade: Eudicots
- Clade: Rosids
- Order: Malvales
- Family: Malvaceae
- Genus: Lueheopsis; Burret

Genus of plants

Lueheopsis is a genus of flowering plants belonging to the family Malvaceae. It is also in the subfamily of Grewioideae.

Its native range is southern Tropical America. It is found in the countries of Bolivia, Brazil, Colombia, Ecuador, French Guiana, Guyana, Peru, Suriname and Venezuela.

The genus name of Lueheopsis is in honour of Carl Emil von der Luehe or Lühe (1751–1801), a German botanist and chamberlain of Princess Caroline-Mathilde of Denmark; later a chamberlain in Vienna, Austria. 'Opsis' refers to the Ancient Greek word ὄψις meaning aspect or appearance. It was first described and published in Notizbl. Bot. Gart. Berlin-Dahlem Vol.9 on page 838 in 1926. ὄψις (ópsis, “aspect", "appearance”)

== Species ==
According to Kew:

- Lueheopsis althaeiflora (Spruce ex Benth.) Burret
- Lueheopsis burretiana Ducke
- Lueheopsis duckeana Burret
- Lueheopsis hoehnei Burret
- Lueheopsis rosea (Ducke) Burret
- Lueheopsis rugosa (Pulle) Burret
