= Vasivaea =

Scientific classification
- Kingdom: Plantae
- Clade: Tracheophytes
- Clade: Angiosperms
- Clade: Eudicots
- Clade: Rosids
- Order: Malvales
- Family: Malvaceae
- Subfamily: Grewioideae
- Genus: Vasivaea; Baill.

Genus of flowering plants

Vasivaea is a genus of flowering plants belonging to the family Malvaceae.

Its native range is tropical South America.

Species:

- Vasivaea alchorneoides Baill.
- Vasivaea podocarpa Kuhlm.
