= Grewia renistipulata =

Conservation status
- Endangered (IUCN 3.1)

Scientific classification
- Kingdom: Plantae
- Clade: Tracheophytes
- Clade: Angiosperms
- Clade: Eudicots
- Clade: Rosids
- Order: Malvales
- Family: Malvaceae
- Subfamily: Grewioideae
- Genus: Grewia
- Species: G. renistipulata

Binomial name
- Grewia renistipulata (Burret) Dorr

Synonyms
- Eleutherostylis renistipulata Burret

Genus of plants

Grewia renistipulata is a species of flowering plant in the family Malvaceae. It is a tree endemic to northeastern New Guinea.

The species was first described as Eleutherostylis renistipulata by Karl Ewald Maximilian Burret in 1926, and placed in the monotypic gens Eleutherostylis. In 2024 Laurence Joseph Dorr placed the species in the genus Grewia as Grewia renistipulata. It is within the Grewioideae subfamily. The genus name of Eleutherostylis is derived from the Greek Eleutheria meaning free and also stylus meaning style. The Latin specific epithet of renistipulata is a combination of two words, reni meaning kidney-shaped, from renes, and stipule, a small appendage at the base of leaves. It was first described and published in Notizbl. Bot. Gart. Berlin-Dahlem Vol.9 on page 629 in 1926.
