= Goethalsia meiantha =

Conservation status
- Least Concern (IUCN 3.1)

Scientific classification
- Kingdom: Plantae
- Clade: Tracheophytes
- Clade: Angiosperms
- Clade: Eudicots
- Clade: Rosids
- Order: Malvales
- Family: Malvaceae
- Subfamily: Grewioideae
- Genus: Goethalsia; Pittier
- Species: G. meiantha

Binomial name
- Goethalsia meiantha (Donn.Sm.) Burret
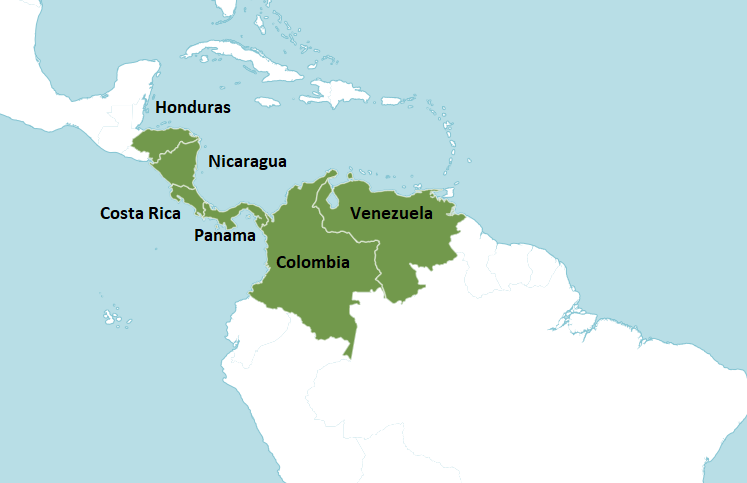
- Species range in Central and South America

Synonyms
- Goethalsia isthmica Pittier; Luehea meiantha Donn.Sm.

Species of flowering plant

Goethalsia is a monotypic genus of flowering plants belonging to the family Malvaceae. It only contains one species, Goethalsia meiantha (Donn.Sm.) Burret. It is within the Grewioideae subfamily.

== Description ==
Goethalsia meiantha is a fast growing, tree reaching to 15–40 m (49–131 ft) in height. It is buttressed at the base, and has thin bark which whitish or pale, and smooth.

The trunk can be up to 40 cm (16 in) in diameter and straight. Inside, the trunk is fibrous material, sometimes hanging in strips. The tree branches are coffee-coloured, with numerous whitish lenticules (lens-shaped, porous tissue). Young branches have sparse simple hairs among a dense coat of short fasciculate (in clusters or bunckes) hairs.

The leaves are alternate arranged and ranked along the twigs. They are elliptic-oblong to obovate-oblong shaped. Situated on 10–12 mm long petioles, with small, caducous (falling off early), stipules (small appendage at the bases of leaf). The leaf-blades are 7–22 cm (3–9 in) long, and 3–8 cm (1–3 in) wide. The apex of the leaf is narrowly acuminate (tapering gradually to a point), while the base is cuneate (wedge-shaped) to rounded. It has a toothed margin. The upper surface of the leaf, has stellate (star shaped) hairs along the veins. While, the lower surface is off-white in colour, and densely covered with appressed (pressed closely but not fused) stellate hairs. There are 2 to 3 pairs of lateral or major veins, the basal pair of veins, being almost as well developed as the principal vein. The tertiary venation is parallel.

It blooms between June and September, with small yellow, fragrant flowers. The inflorescences are paniculate, both terminal and axillary (arising from the axil) situated. They are shorter than the leaves, and with small (about 2 mm long) persistent bracts. The flowers have an epicalyx (an involucre bract resembling an outer calyx or sepals) of 3 bracteoles (small bracts), which are each 3–4 mm long, and with a pale yellowish pubescence (soft down on the leaves). The calyx and corolla (petals of a flower) are 5-merous. The sepals are lanceolate, shortly connate (cone shaped) at the base, and 10 mm long. They are villous (covered with long, soft, straight hairs), with long simple hairs, on the internal surface, and tomentose (dense covering of short, matted hairs), with fine, stellate, deciduous, hairs, on the outer surface. They are yellow on the inner surface and green on the outer surface. The petals are also yellow. They are oblong or obovate, about 4 mm long and densely villous on the claw of the petal. The remainder of the petal is pappillose (has many small fleshy projections), and is scattered with long stellate hairs. Their base bears long oblong nectarial glands.

The flowers are hermaphroditic, as the stamens and pistils are borne on a short (1.5-1.8 mm long) glabrous (smooth) stalk, or (androgynophore - a stalk bearing both the androecium and gynoecium of a flower). It is surmounted by a villous urceolus (flask-shaped body) which is about 2 mm in diameter, which surrounds the base of the stamens. There are about 25 stamens, in 5 indistinct bundles or groups. they are slightly connate at the base, and have globose anthers. The ovary is sessile (attached without a stalk) on the androgynophore. It has 3 or 4 locules (chambers), each containing 4 ovules. There is a simple, single, filiform (thread-like) style, with an indistinctly 3-lobed stigma.

It fruits from July to January. The fruit (or seed capsule) is composed of 3, or less commonly 2 or 4, connate, indehiscent, samaroid, (similar to a winged seed capsule) mericarps, (one segment of the fruit), which is eventually separate from the central axis. Each fruit is approx. 10 cm (4 in) long and 6 cm (2 in) wide. They are green when young, maturing to a purplish-grey, or dark green. Each samara is oblong in contour, widely winged around a more or less globular and dark, thicker, central portion, which has an irregular transverse crest. The wings are 3–5 cm (1–2 in) long and 1.5–2 cm (1–1 in) wide. Each samara contains 1 to 4 flattened, pyriform (pear-shaped) seeds, which are 2.8–4 mm long and 1.8-2.5 mm wide. The seed possesses abundant endosperm (tissue around the seed). The cotyledons are flat and leaf-like. Few seeds are viable, because only one of the three joined fruits has an embryo.

== Taxonomy ==
It has the common names of Guácimo blanco, or jaunilama, chancho blanco, guaicimo.

The genus name of Goethalsia is in honour of George Washington Goethals (1858–1928), an American army officer with the United States Army and also Civil engineer. The Latin specific epithet of meiantha is derived from refers to the Greek word meion meaning less, smaller or lesser, and also anther (the pollen-bearing part of a stamen)

The genus was first described and published in Repert. Spec. Nov. Regni Veg. Vol.13 on page 313 in 1914, and then the species was first described and published in Notizbl. Bot. Gart. Berlin-Dahlem Vol.9 on page 815 in 1926.

It was originally placed within the Tiliaceae family, and some sources still class it within that family. It was then placed in the Flacourtiaceae family, before that was dismantled in 1975. It was then placed within the family of Malvaceae alongside Luehea Willd.. DNA sequencing then further narrowed down its origin and placed it among the "grewioids".

It has a close relationship with Colona Cav. (also within the subfamily Grewioideae) but with enough differences such as in the epicalyx to make it a different genus.

== Range and habitat ==
It is native range is the neotropics, from Central America to Venezuela. It is also found in the countries of Colombia, Costa Rica, Honduras, Nicaragua and Panama.

It is very common to the second-growth forests in Costa Rica, and other forests in humid regions.

Goethalsia meiantha of the most common trees in the Golfo Dulce, Costa Rica region and it also grows in La Selva Biological Station.

It is also known as a pioneer tree.

=== Habitat ===
It is found growing in clay-like soils, in moist to very wet lowland in open sites. It is also found at the edges of forest and in light gaps (within a forest). The tree grows at elevations from 0–900 m (0–2,953 ft) in areas where annual rainfall is about 4000 mm and the average temperature is 26°C.

== Uses ==
It has low to moderate timber value, The wood is white when green, it is classified as light (with a specific gravity is 0.35) and soft, and it also dries quickly without the appearance of major defects. It is deemed easy to work and preserve, and it can be finished well, but it has a low resistance to biodegrading organisms (i.e. woodworm, etc.). It is often used for making fenceposts, handles for light tools, boxes, cases, broomsticks and roof boards and in interior and external construction. The species ranks second in demand in the match industry (within South America), because it is very abundant and grows fast.

It also has a thick fibrous bark which can be torn into long strips and is used in the manufacture of local handicrafts.

It has been evaluated for an early species selected for tropical reforestation.

The fruit can be collected between February and April and also in October. The fruits can then be collected directly from the tree, when they start to turn dark brown. They are then spread over the ground to dry and then can be planted.

== Cultivation ==
It can be affected by fungal species, such as Diaporthe.

Nymphs of cicada species of Zammara smaragdina burrow into the earth beside the roots of this tree and those of Pentaclethra macroloba.

== Other sources ==
- Williams, L. 1928, Studies of some tropical American woods. Tropical Woods 15:14-24
