= Ancistrocarpus =

Scientific classification
- Kingdom: Plantae
- Clade: Tracheophytes
- Clade: Angiosperms
- Clade: Eudicots
- Clade: Rosids
- Order: Malvales
- Family: Malvaceae
- Subfamily: Grewioideae
- Genus: Ancistrocarpus; Oliv. (1867)

Synonyms
- Acrosepalum Pierre (1898)

Genus of flowering plants

Ancistrocarpus is a genus of flowering plants belonging to the family Malvaceae.

Its native range is Nigeria to Western Central Tropical Africa.

Species:

- Ancistrocarpus bequaertii De Wild.
- Ancistrocarpus comperei R.Wilczek
- Ancistrocarpus densispinosus Oliv.
