= Tetralix =

Scientific classification
- Kingdom: Plantae
- Clade: Embryophytes
- Clade: Tracheophytes
- Clade: Angiosperms
- Clade: Eudicots
- Clade: Rosids
- Order: Malvales
- Family: Malvaceae
- Subfamily: Grewioideae
- Genus: Tetralix; Griseb.

Species
- See text

Genus of flowering plants

Tetralix is a genus of flowering plant in the mallow family, Malvaceae. It is native to Cuba. Members of the genus are adapted to serpentine soils, and are nickel hyperaccumulators.

== Species ==
Five species are currently accepted.

- Tetralix brachypetalus Griseb.
- Tetralix cristalensis Bisse
- Tetralix jaucoensis Bisse
- Tetralix moaensis Bisse
- Tetralix nipensis Urb.
