= Desplatsia =

Scientific classification
- Kingdom: Plantae
- Clade: Tracheophytes
- Clade: Angiosperms
- Clade: Eudicots
- Clade: Rosids
- Order: Malvales
- Family: Malvaceae
- Genus: Desplatsia; Bocq.

Synonyms
- Grewiella Kuntze; Grewiopsis De Wild. & T.Durand; Ledermannia Mildbr. & Burret; Pleianthemum K.Schum. ex A.Chev.

Genus of flowering plants

Desplatsia is a genus of flowering plants belonging to the family Malvaceae. Its native range is western and west-central tropical Africa to Uganda.

The genus name of Desplatsia is in honour of Mr Desplats, thought possibly to be Victor Desplats (1819–1888).

== species ==
Four species are accepted.

- Desplatsia chrysochlamys (Mildbr. & Burret) Mildbr. & Burret
- Desplatsia dewevrei (De Wild. & T.Durand) Burret
- Desplatsia mildbraedii Burret
- Desplatsia subericarpa Bocq.
