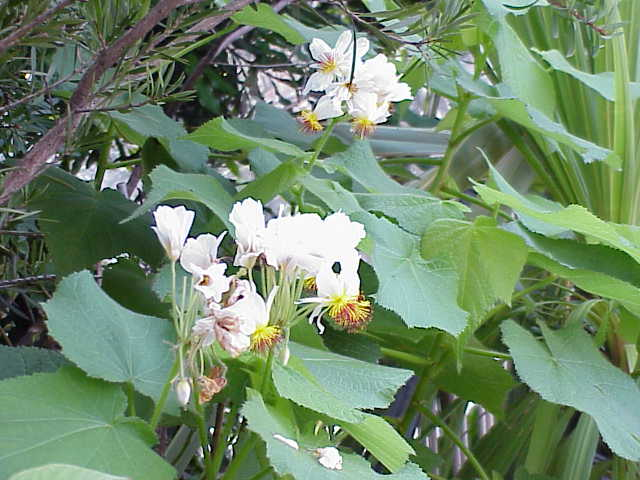
- Sparrmannia africana

Scientific classification
- Kingdom: Plantae
- Clade: Tracheophytes
- Clade: Angiosperms
- Clade: Eudicots
- Clade: Rosids
- Order: Malvales
- Family: Malvaceae
- Subfamily: Grewioideae
- Genus: Sparrmannia; L.f.

Synonyms
- Vossianthus Kuntze

= Sparrmannia =

Genus of plants

Sparrmannia is a genus of flowering plants in the family Malvaceae. It includes three species native to eastern, central, and southern Africa and Madagascar.

== Species ==
Plants of the World Online accepts three species.

- Sparrmannia africana L.f.
- Sparrmannia palmata Baker
- Sparrmannia ricinocarpa (Eckl. & Zeyh.) Kuntze
