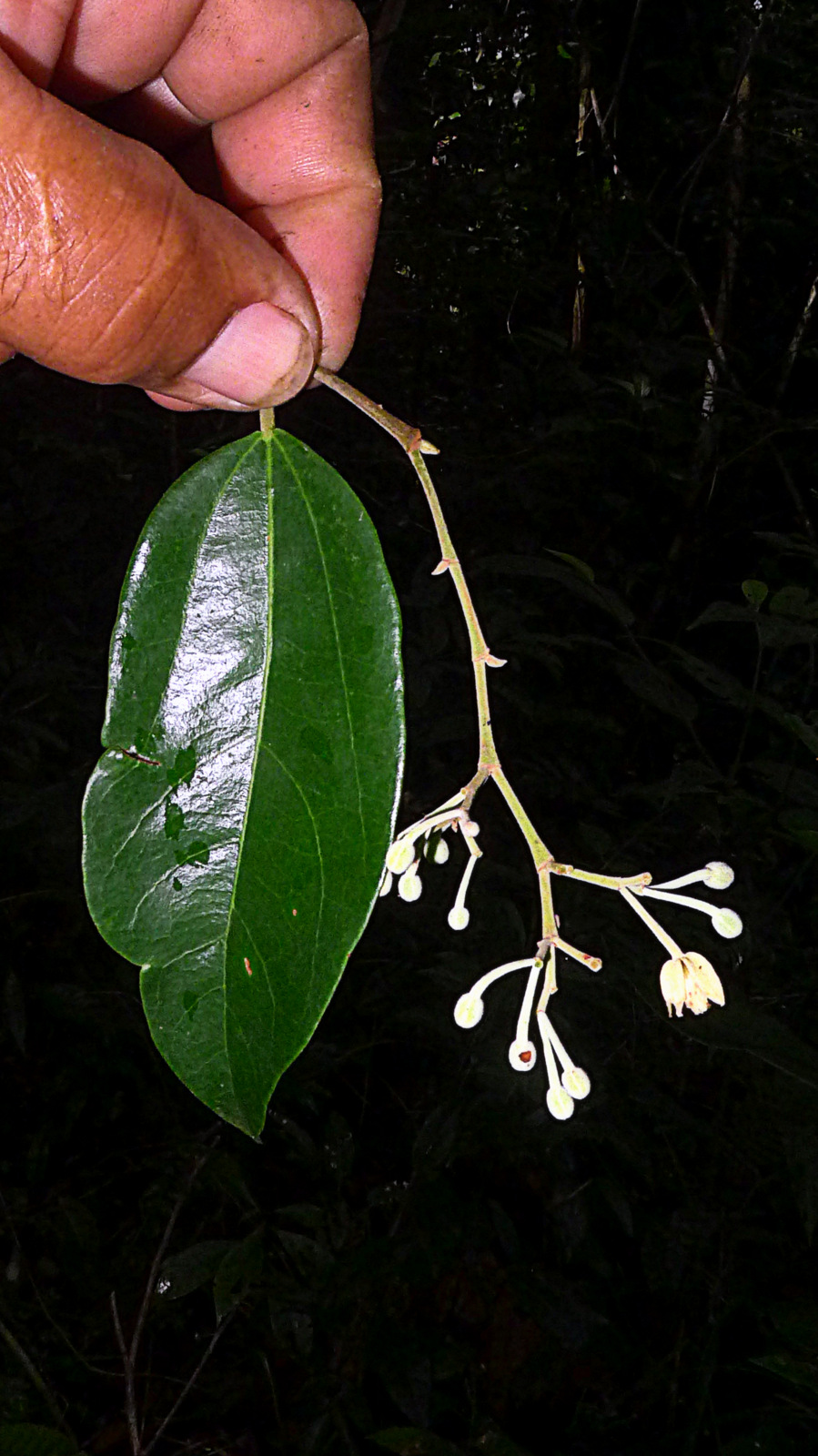
- Hydrogaster trinervis Kuhlm

Scientific classification
- Kingdom: Plantae
- Clade: Tracheophytes
- Clade: Angiosperms
- Clade: Eudicots
- Clade: Rosids
- Order: Malvales
- Family: Malvaceae
- Genus: Hydrogaster; Kuhlm.
- Species: H. trinervis

Binomial name
- Hydrogaster trinervis Kuhlm.

= Hydrogaster =

Genus of plants

Hydrogaster is a monotypic genus of flowering plants belonging to the family Malvaceae. It only contains one species, Hydrogaster trinervis, a tree native to eastern Brazil.
