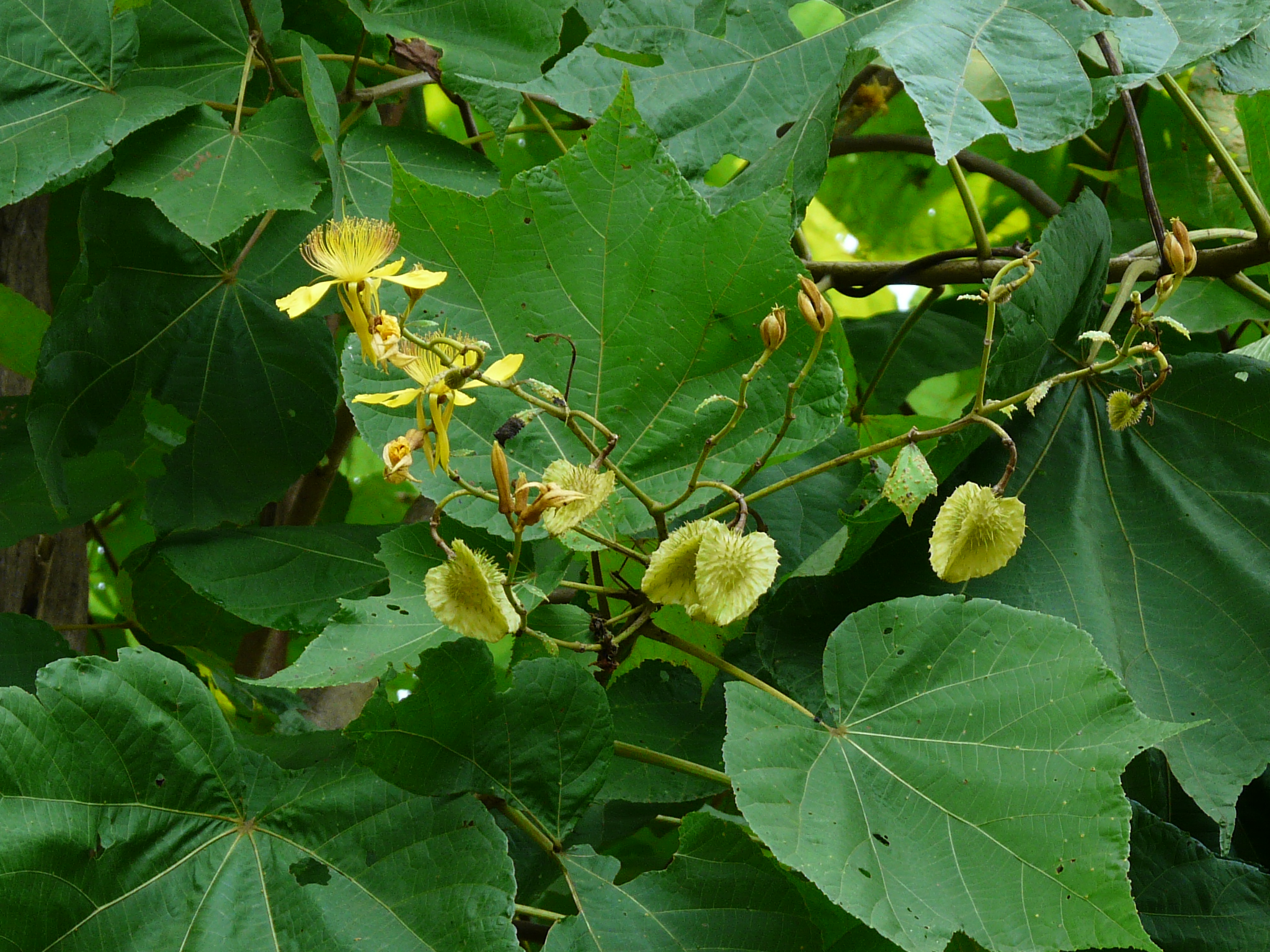

Conservation status
- Vulnerable (IUCN 3.1)

Scientific classification
- Kingdom: Plantae
- Clade: Embryophytes
- Clade: Tracheophytes
- Clade: Spermatophytes
- Clade: Angiosperms
- Clade: Eudicots
- Clade: Rosids
- Order: Malvales
- Family: Malvaceae
- Genus: Erinocarpus; Nimmo ex J.Graham (1839)
- Species: E. nimmonii

Binomial name
- Erinocarpus nimmonii J.Graham (1839)

Synonyms
- Erinocarpus knimonii Hassk. (1855); Erinocarpus nimmoanus Mast. (1874)

= Erinocarpus =

Species of flowering plant

Erinocarpus nimmonii is a species of flowering plant in the family Malvaceae. It is the sole species in genus Erinocarpus. It is a tree which grows about 10 meters (33 ft) tall. It is native to southwestern India.

Erinocarpus nimmonii is mostly found in the central and northern Western Ghats, in the states of Goa, Gujarat, Karnataka, and Maharashtra. Its northernmost range extends to Valsad in southern Gujarat. It grows on hill slopes and along stream and river banks in moist deciduous forests from 600 to 1,000 meters (2,000 to 3,300 ft) elevation.
