= Heliocarpus appendiculatus =

Conservation status
- Least Concern (IUCN 3.1)

Scientific classification
- Kingdom: Plantae
- Clade: Embryophytes
- Clade: Tracheophytes
- Clade: Spermatophytes
- Clade: Angiosperms
- Clade: Eudicots
- Clade: Rosids
- Order: Malvales
- Family: Malvaceae
- Genus: Heliocarpus
- Species: H. appendiculatus

Binomial name
- Heliocarpus appendiculatus Turcz.

Synonyms
- Heliocarpus chontalensis Sprague

Species of plant

Heliocarpus appendiculatus is a widespread species of flowering plant in the family Malvaceae. It is native to Mexico, Central America, and Trinidad. A tree reaching 15 m (49 ft), it is typically found in forests at elevations from 100 to 2,200 m (300 to 7,200 ft). It has been assessed as Least Concern.
