= Pseudocorchorus =

Scientific classification
- Kingdom: Plantae
- Clade: Tracheophytes
- Clade: Angiosperms
- Clade: Eudicots
- Clade: Rosids
- Order: Malvales
- Family: Malvaceae
- Genus: Pseudocorchorus; Capuron

Genus of plants

Pseudocorchorus is a genus of flowering plants belonging to the family Malvaceae.

Its native range is Madagascar.

Species:

- Pseudocorchorus alatus Capuron
- Pseudocorchorus cornutus Capuron
- Pseudocorchorus greveanus (Baill.) Capuron
- Pseudocorchorus mamillatus Capuron
- Pseudocorchorus pusillus Capuron
- Pseudocorchorus rostratus (Danguy) Mabb.
