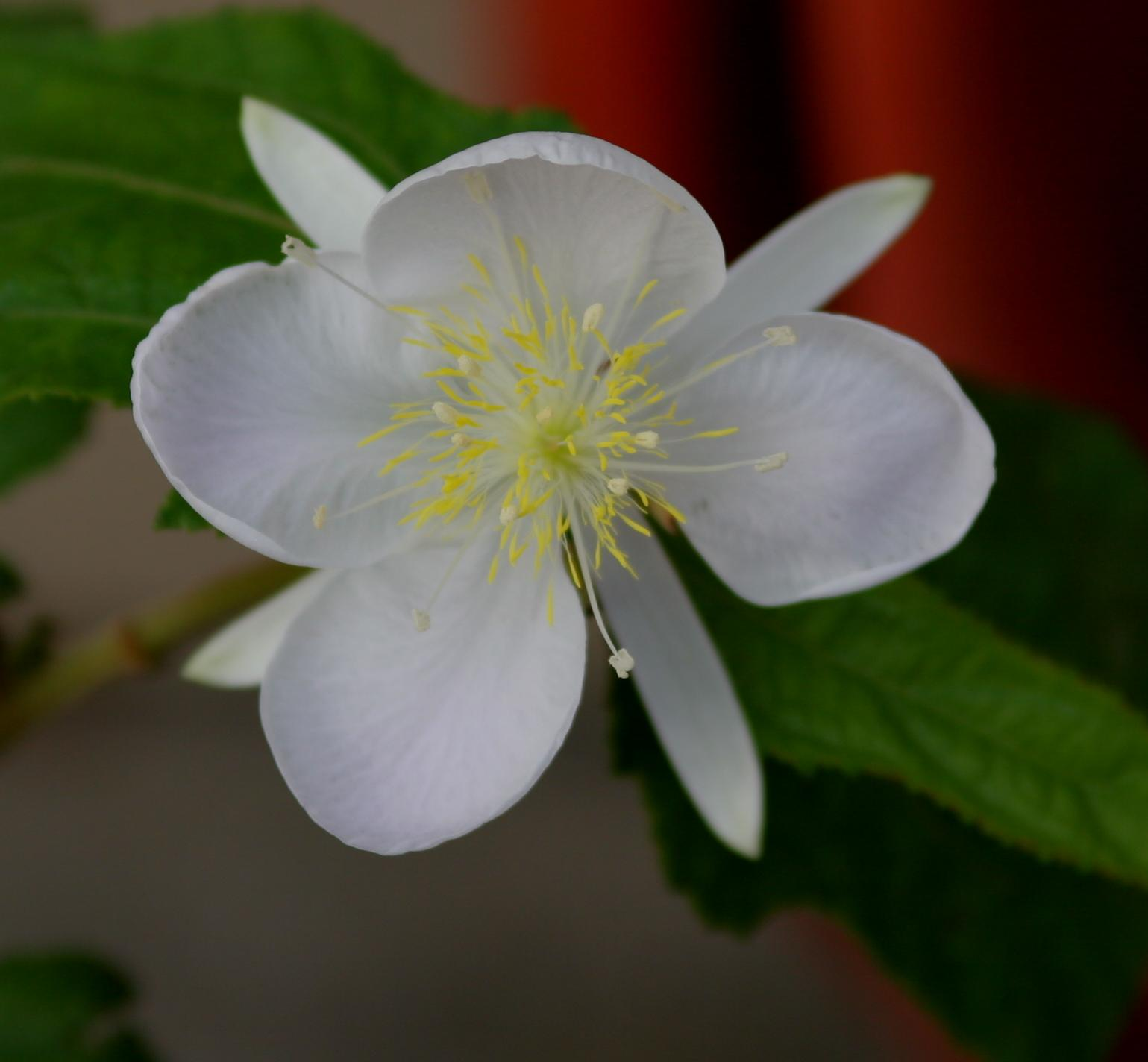
- Clappertonia ficifolia

Scientific classification
- Kingdom: Plantae
- Clade: Tracheophytes
- Clade: Angiosperms
- Clade: Eudicots
- Clade: Rosids
- Order: Malvales
- Family: Malvaceae
- Genus: Clappertonia; Meisn.

Synonyms
- Cephalonema K.Schum. ex Sprague; Honkenya Willd. ex Cothen.

= Clappertonia =

Genus of flowering plants

Clappertonia is a genus of flowering plants belonging to the family Malvaceae.

Its native range is Tropical Africa.

Species:

- Clappertonia ficifolia (Willd.) Decne.
- Clappertonia minor (Baill.) Bech.
- Clappertonia polyandra (K.Schum. ex Sprague) Bech.
