= Monic languages =

Branch of Austroasiatic languages in Southeast Asia

Monic
- Geographic distribution: Indochina, Malay Peninsula
- Linguistic classification: Austroasiatic: Monic
- Early form: Old Mon
- Subdivisions: Mon; Nyah Kur

Language codes
- Glottolog: moni1258
- Monic

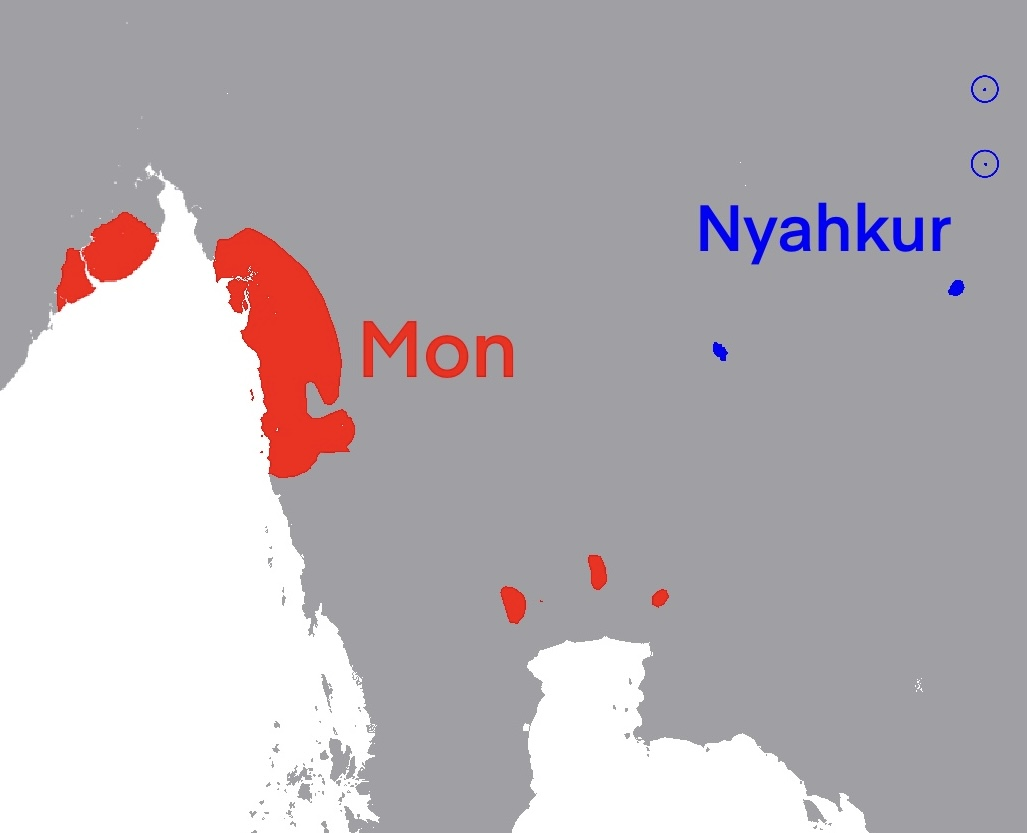
- Monic languages distribution in Thailand and Myanmar. Mon language Nyah Kur language

The Monic /ˈmoʊnɪk/ languages are a branch of the Austroasiatic language family descended from the Old Monic language of the kingdom of Dvaravati in what is now central Thailand. The Nyahkur people continue directly from that kingdom, whereas the Mon are descendants of those who migrated to Pegu after the 11th century Khmer conquest of Dvaravati.

== Classification ==
Paul Sidwell proposed the following tree ("stammbaum") for Monic, synthesizing past classifications from Theraphan L-Thongkum (1984) and Gérard Diffloth (1984).

- Old Mon / Proto-Monic
  - Nyah Kur
    - North
    - Central
    - South
  - Middle Mon
    - Literary Mon
    - Mon Ro: Northernmost dialect, spoken in the Pegu-Paung-Zin Kyaik area
      - West Mon Ro variety: Spoken from north of Martaban to Thaton
      - East Mon Ro variety: Spoken in a small area on the south bank of the Gyaing River
    - Mon Rao: Spoken around Mawlamyine, extending several hundred kilometers south to Dawei
      - North Mon Rao
      - Kamarwet area Mon
      - South Mon Rao
      - Ye Mon Rao: This is the southernmost Mon variety.
    - Thai Mon (mix of Mon Ro and Mon Rao)

== Proto-language ==
Proto-Monic
- Reconstruction of: Monic languages
- Reconstructed ancestor: Proto-Austroasiatic
- Lower-order reconstructions: Proto-Nyah Kur; Proto-Mon

Selected animal and plant names in Proto-Monic, Proto-Nyah Kur, and Proto-Mon (Diffloth 1984):

=== Mammals ===
species	Proto-Monic	Proto-Nyah Kur	Proto-Mon
Tupaia sp.	*[c/s]naaʔ	*ɕhna̱aʔ	
Panthera tigris corbetti	*klaaʔ	*khla̱aʔ	*kla̱ʔ
Lutrogale perspicillata, Lutra lutra nair	*phɛɛʔ	*phɛ̱ɛʔ	*phɛ̱ʔ
Bos gaurus readei	*kndiiŋ	*kənti̤iɲ	*kəlɤ̱i̯ɲ
Rusa unicolor equinus	*tɓuŋ	*thbu̱ŋ	*ɓɒ̱ɨ̯ŋ
Rucervus eldii thamin, Cervus eldi siamensis	*[r]maŋ	*ləma̤ŋ	*mɛ̤a̯ŋ
Muntiacus muntjak vaginalis, Muntiacus feae	*pas	*pa̱j̊	*pɔ̱h
Hystrix hodgsoni	*lmliəŋ	*ləmli̤aŋ	*pəli̤ə̯ŋ
Ursus thibetanus	*kmu̱m	*khmu̱m	*[k]hmi̱m

=== Birds ===
species	Proto-Monic	Proto-Nyah Kur	Proto-Mon
Corvus splendens	*klʔaak	*kəlʔa̱ak	*həɗa̱i̯c
Caprimulgus macrurus	*klwaaʔ	*kəwa̱aʔ	*kəwa̱ʔ
Caprimulgus macrurus?	*ʔ[m]blak	*bla̱k	*ʔəplɛ̤a̯k
Spizaetus sp.	*liŋ-liəŋ	*liŋ-li̤aŋ	*kəni̤ə̯ŋ
Gallus gallus	*tjaaŋ	*chja̱aŋ	*ca̱i̯ɲ
Psittacula eupatria avensis, Psittacula finschii?	*kreeɲ	*krə̱əɲ	*krʌ̱i̯ɲ
Coturnix sp.	*cgɯt	*cəkɯ̤t	*hək[i̤/ɯ̤]t
Pseudogyps bengalensis?	*t-[m]-maat	*tə(m)ma̱at	*[k]əma̱t
Oriolus chinensis?	*mit	*mɯ̤t	*mi̤t
Treron phoenicopterus viridifrons	*prgum	*pərkṳm	*həkə̤m
Eudynamis scolopacea malayana	*t[]wa(a)w	*t()wa̱w	*kəwa̱o̯
Streptopelia orientalis	*puur	*pu̱ur	*pɒ̱u̯

=== Other animals ===
species	Proto-Monic	Proto-Nyah Kur	Proto-Mon
Periplaneta sp.	*sdɛɛʔ	*ɕətɛ̤ɛʔ	*həte̤ʔ
Apis dorsata	*saaj	*ɕa̱aj	*sa̱i̯
Trionyx cartilageneus	*dwiiʔ	*[c/t]həwi̤iʔ	*kwi̤ʔ
Fluta alba	*doŋ-nooŋ	*kənto̤oŋ ~ *tṳŋ-to̤oŋ	*hələ̤ɨ̯ŋ
Ophiocephalus striatus	*knlɔɔn	*kənlu̱an	*kəno̤n
Varanus nebulosus	*trkɔɔt	*təku̱at	*həko̱t

=== Plants ===
species	Proto-Monic	Proto-Nyah Kur	Proto-Mon
Bambusa arundinacea	*ɟrlaaʔ	*chəla̤aʔ	*həlɛ̤ə̯ʔ
Antiaris toxicaria	*kɟiiʔ	*kəci̤iʔ	*kji̤ʔ
Imperata cylindrica	*cwooʔ	*chwo̱oʔ	*khwɒ̱ɨ̯ʔ
Entada rheedei	*ɟnlɛɛʔ	*khənlɛ̤ɛʔ	*həne̤ʔ
Eugenia cumini	*kriəŋ	*kri̱aŋ	*kri̱ə̯ŋ
Dipterocarpus alatus, Dipterocarpus turbinatus	*g[]jaaŋ	*khəja̤aŋ	*həja̤i̯ɲ
Pentace burmanica	*sit-siət	*ɕit-ɕi̱at	*kəsə̱t
Berrya mollis	*klwaan	*kəlwa̱an	*kəlwa̱an
Spondias mangifera	*[k]ʔiil	*[kh]əʔi̱il	*ʔi̱
Ficus bengalensis, Ficus religiosa	*ɟrəj	*chrə̤j	*sɔ̤e̯
Phyllanthus emblica	*trluuj	*təlu̱uj	*kəlu̱i̯

== Lexical innovations ==
Selected Monic lexical innovations:

Gloss	Proto-Austroasiatic	Proto-Monic	Old Mon	Nyah Kur
‘knee’	*psaɲ	*ɟroːm	–	chròːm
‘money’	*swaːʔ	*knuːj	knuj	khǝnúːj
‘chicken’	*ʔiər	*tjaːŋ	tyaiŋ	cháːŋ
‘dog’	*cɔːʔ	*clur	kløw	chúr

== See also ==
- List of Proto-Monic reconstructions (Wiktionary)
- Mon language
- Nyah Kur language
