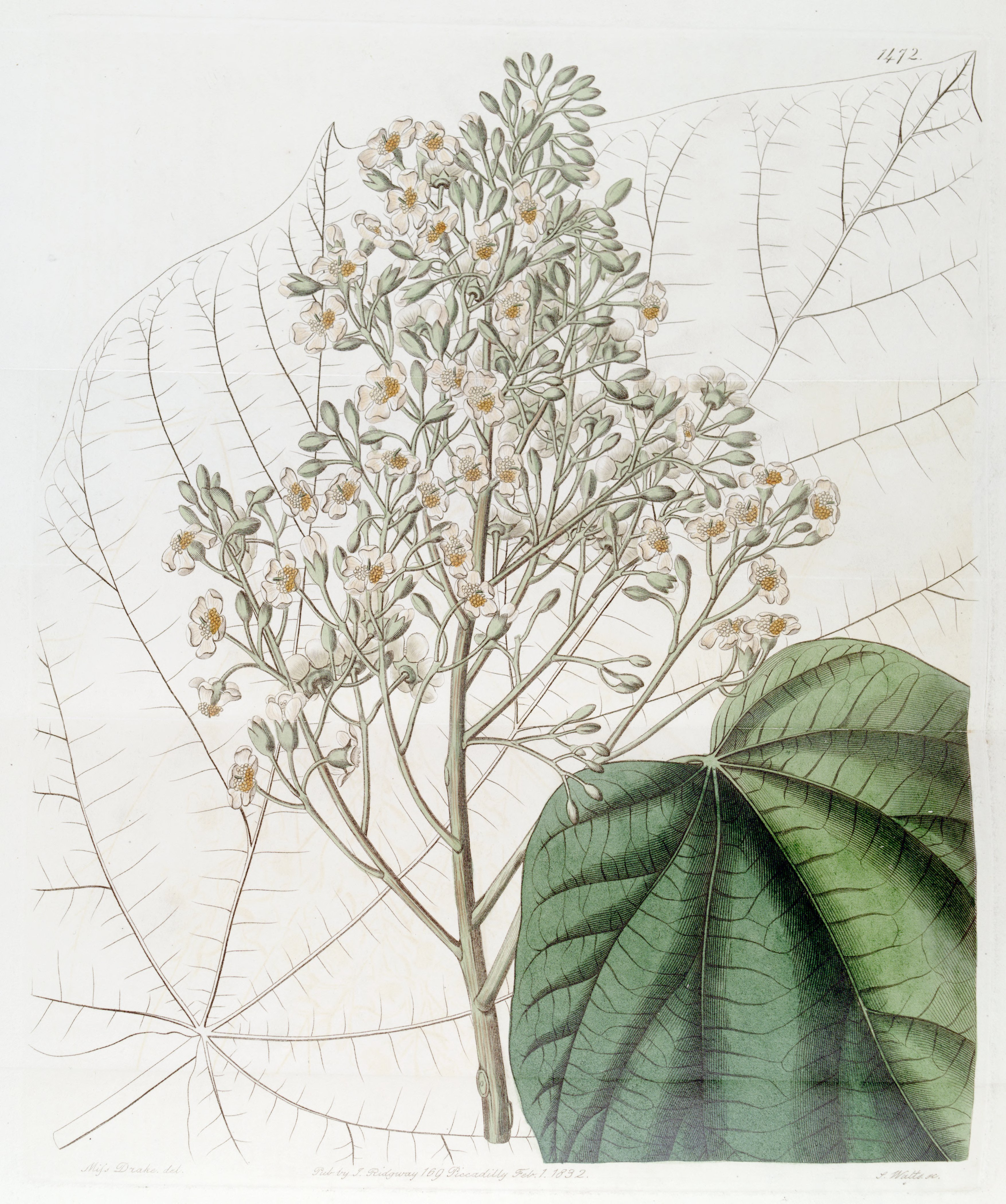
- Brownlowia elata

Scientific classification
- Kingdom: Plantae
- Clade: Embryophytes
- Clade: Tracheophytes
- Clade: Spermatophytes
- Clade: Angiosperms
- Clade: Eudicots
- Clade: Rosids
- Order: Malvales
- Family: Malvaceae
- Subfamily: Brownlowioideae; Burret

Genera
- Berrya Roxb.; Brownlowia Roxb.; Carpodiptera Griseb.; Christiana DC.; Diplodiscus Turcz.; Indagator Halford; Jarandersonia Kosterm.; Pentace Hassk.; Pityranthe Thwaites; Somnuekia Duangjai, Chalermw., Sinbumr. & Suddee

= Brownlowioideae =

Subfamily of flowering plants

Brownlowioideae is a subfamily of the botanical family Malvaceae. It includes ten genera distributed in the tropical Americas, Africa, Asia, New Guinea, Australia, and the Pacific. The genera in this subfamily used to be a part of the paraphyletic Tiliaceae until taxonomic revisions in part by the APG II system.

== Genera ==
Ten genera are accepted.

- Berrya Roxb. – 6 sp., tropical Asia, Australia, and southwest Pacific
- Brownlowia Roxb. – 29 sp., tropical Asia and New Guinea
- Carpodiptera Griseb. – 4 sp., tropical Africa and tropical Americas
- Christiana DC. – 6 sp., tropical Africa and tropical Americas
- Diplodiscus Turcz. – 11 sp., Malesia
- Indagator Halford – 1 sp., Queensland
- Jarandersonia Kosterm. – 8 sp., Borneo
- Pentace Hassk. – 30 sp., Indochina and Malesia
- Pityranthe Thwaites (synonym Hainania Merr.) – 2 sp., Sri Lanka and southern China
- Somnuekia Duangjai, Chalermw., Sinbumr. & Suddee – 1 sp., Thailand
