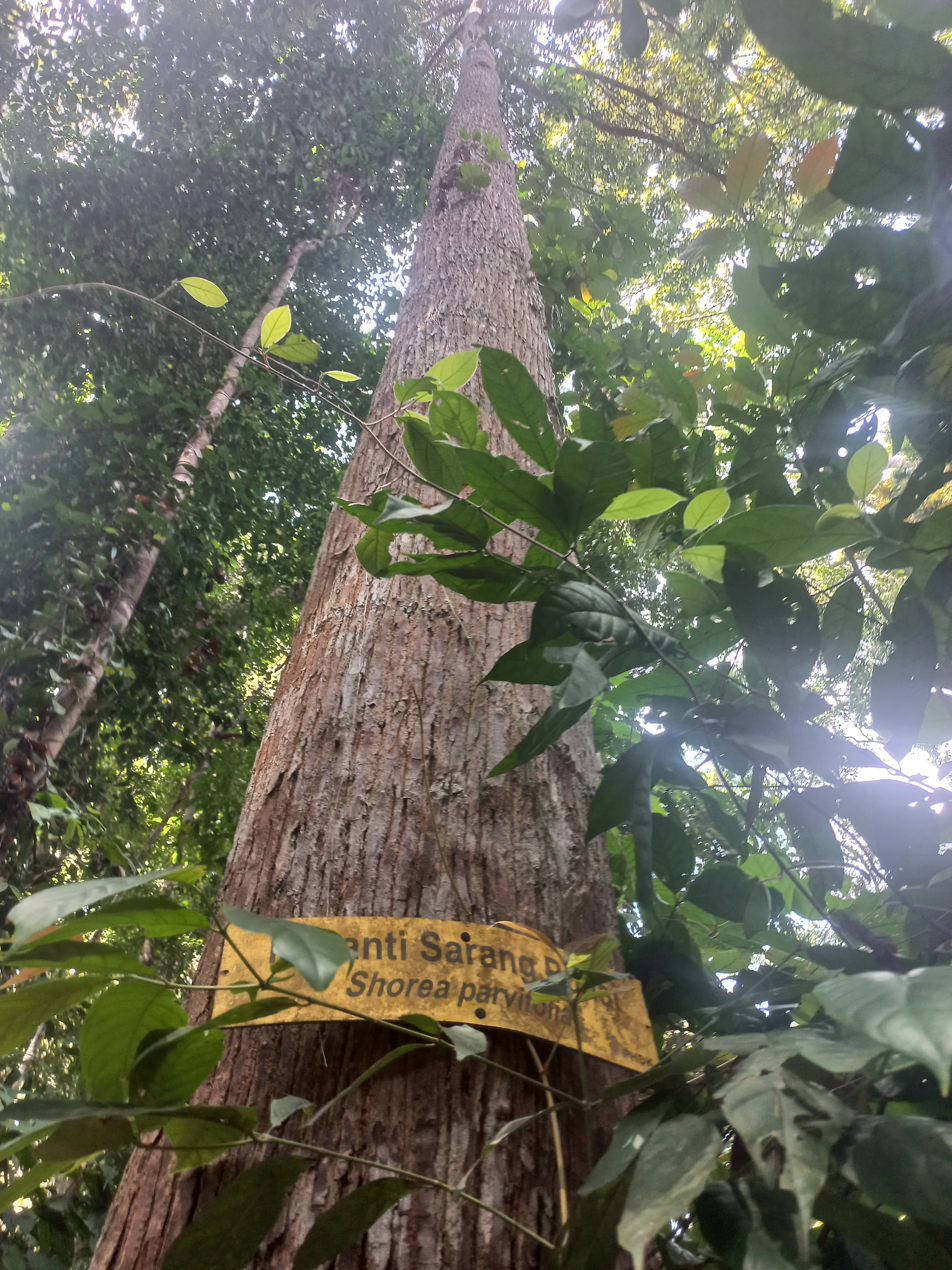
- Bark of Rubroshorea parvifolia

Conservation status
- Least Concern (IUCN 3.1)

Scientific classification
- Kingdom: Plantae
- Clade: Embryophytes
- Clade: Tracheophytes
- Clade: Spermatophytes
- Clade: Angiosperms
- Clade: Eudicots
- Clade: Rosids
- Order: Malvales
- Family: Dipterocarpaceae
- Genus: Rubroshorea
- Species: R. parvifolia

Binomial name
- Rubroshorea parvifolia (Dyer) P.S.Ashton and J.Heck.

Synonyms
- Shorea gentilis Parijs; Shorea parvifolia Dyer (1874) (basionym); Shorea parvifolia subsp. velutinata P.S.Ashton; Shorea scutulata King

= Rubroshorea parvifolia =

Species of tree native to Southeast Asia

Rubroshorea parvifolia is a species of tree in the family Dipterocarpaceae, commonly known as light red meranti and white lauan. It is native to Borneo, Sumatra, Peninsular Malaysia, and Peninsular Thailand.

== Description ==
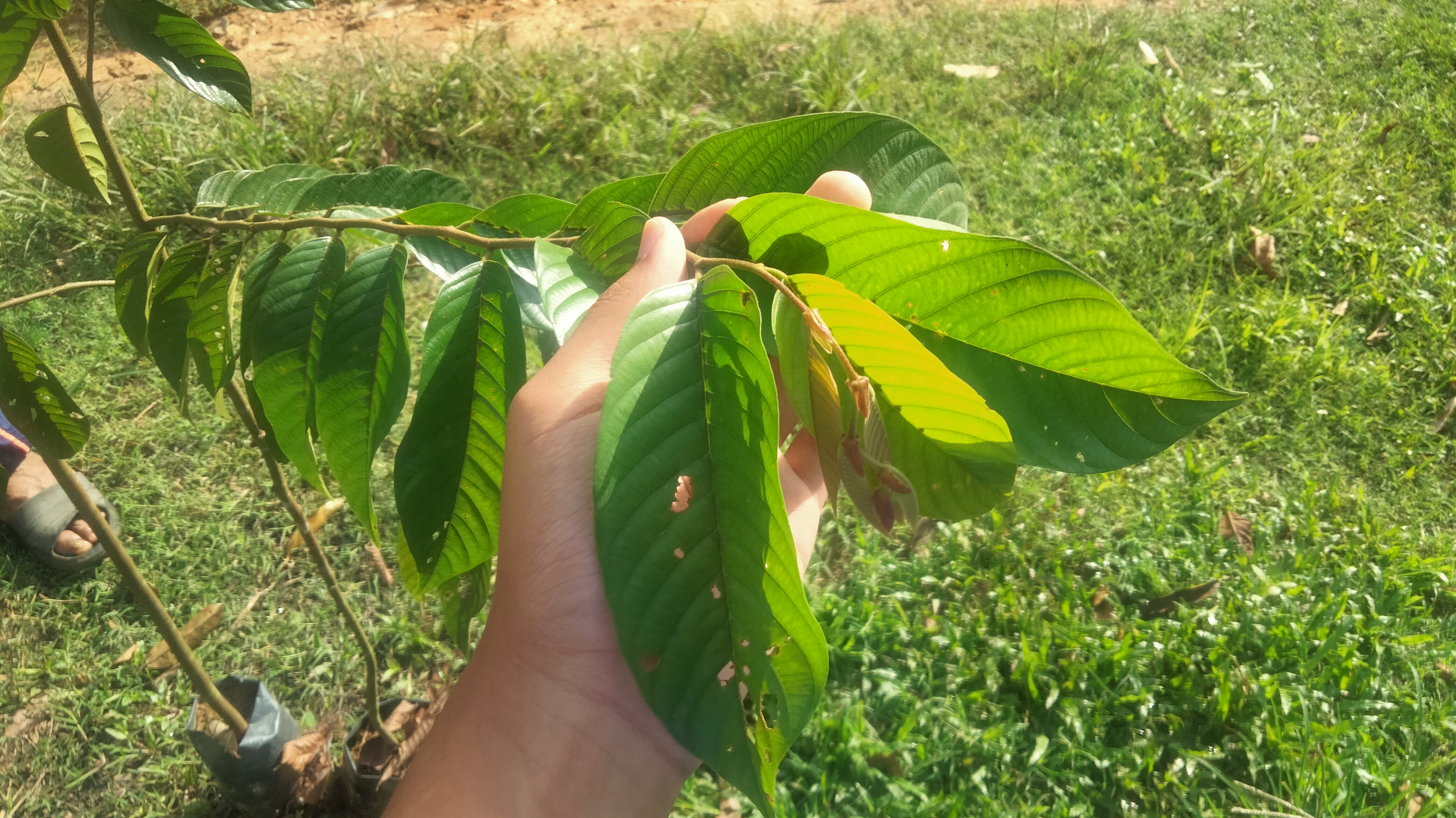
Leaves of Rubroshorea parvifolia

Rubroshorea parvifolia develops into a large forest tree up to 65 m (210 ft) tall with a wide crown. The trunk can grow to a diameter of 2 m (7 ft) with large buttresses up to 4 m (13 ft) high, but most of the largest trees have been selectively logged, leaving behind more modest specimens.

== Distribution and habitat ==
Rubroshorea parvifolia is native to Peninsular Malaysia, Peninsular Thailand, Borneo and Sumatra. It is one of the commonest dipterocarp species in lowland forests in the region, growing at elevations of up to 800 m (2,600 ft). It grows on both clayey and sandy soils, in swampy areas and riverbanks, and on drier hillsides and ridges.

== Ecology ==
This tree flowers in an irregular cycle lasting three to seven years, with all the trees flowering simultaneously. Pollination is mostly performed by beetles and thrips. The fruits have wings but mostly land within 30 m (100 ft) of the parent tree. When the seeds falls on fallow land, the saplings do not at first grow as fast as the pioneer species such as Macaranga. However the saplings are shade tolerant, and after thirty years, Rubroshorea parvifolia and Pentace laxiflora dominate the other tree species. The tree roots form ectomycorrhizal relationships with a variety of soil fungi.

== Uses ==
The timber is pink or pinkish-brown with white resinous streaks. It is typically used for panelling, joinery, light carpentry, furniture, plywood, crates, boxes, veneers and other purposes.

== Status ==
Rubroshorea parvifolia has a wide range and is a common species. It is under threat from selective logging of the best trees, which may reduce the genetic diversity of the population, and from clearance of forests to make way for palm oil and other plantations. Nevertheless, it is listed by the International Union for Conservation of Nature as being of least concern as it does not currently meet the criteria for a more threatened category.
