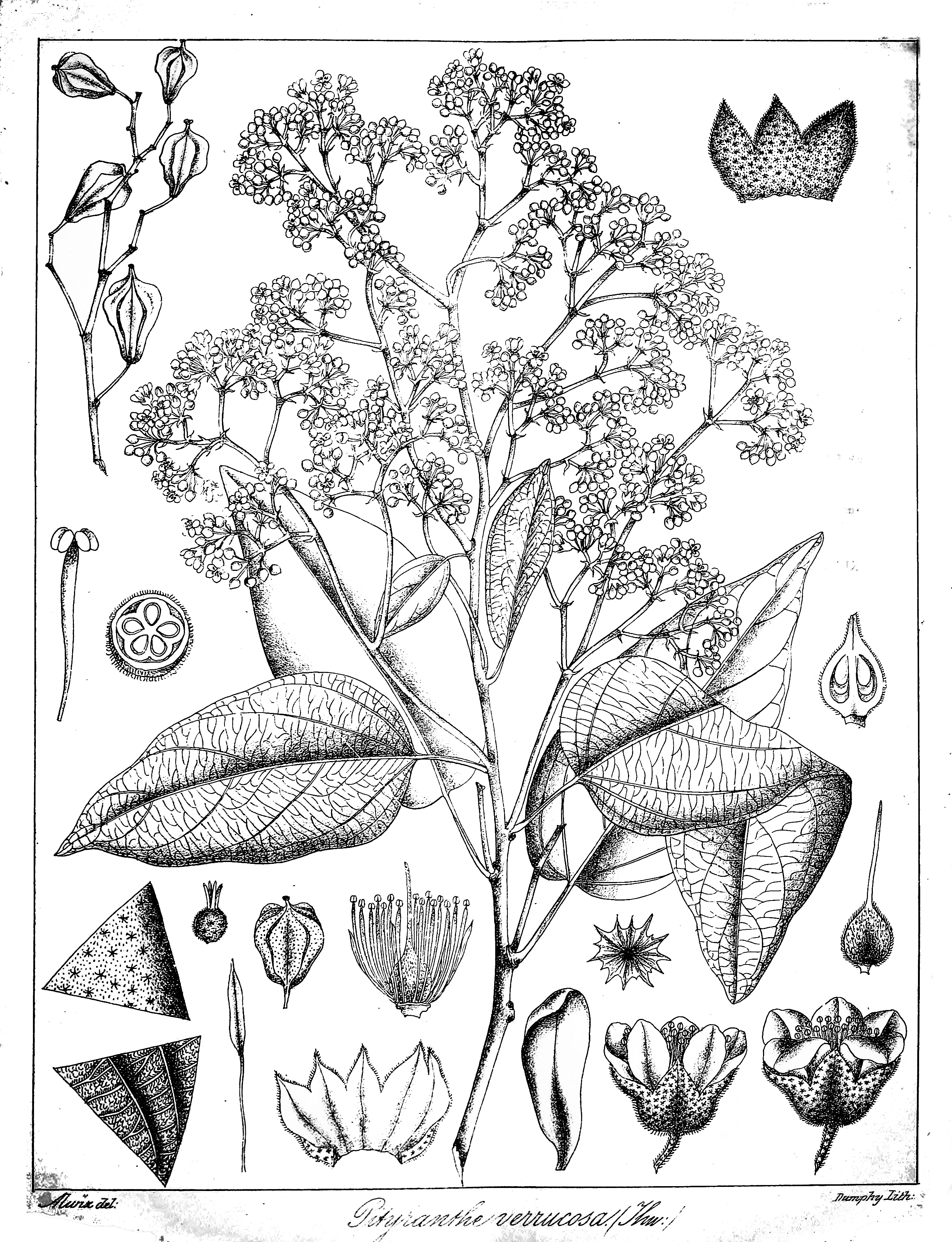
- Diplodiscus verrucosus

Scientific classification
- Kingdom: Plantae
- Clade: Tracheophytes
- Clade: Angiosperms
- Clade: Eudicots
- Clade: Rosids
- Order: Malvales
- Family: Malvaceae
- Subfamily: Brownlowioideae
- Genus: Diplodiscus; Turcz.

= Diplodiscus =

Genus of flowering plants

Diplodiscus is a genus of flowering plants in the family Malvaceae. It includes 11 species native to Borneo, Peninsular Malaysia, and the Philippines.

They are trees and shrubs with bell-shaped flowers.

== Species ==
11 species are accepted.

- Diplodiscus aureus Kosterm.
- Diplodiscus decumbens Kosterm.
- Diplodiscus hookerianus (King) Kosterm.
- Diplodiscus latifii R.C.K.Chung
- Diplodiscus longifolius (Merr.) Burret
- Diplodiscus longipetiolatus Kosterm.
- Diplodiscus microlepis Kosterm.
- Diplodiscus paniculatus Turcz.
- Diplodiscus parviflorus Kosterm.
- Diplodiscus scortechinii (King) Ashton ex Kochummen
- Diplodiscus suluensis (Warb. ex Perkins) Burret
