= Diplodiscus scortechinii =

Conservation status
- Endangered (IUCN 3.1)

Scientific classification
- Kingdom: Plantae
- Clade: Tracheophytes
- Clade: Angiosperms
- Clade: Eudicots
- Clade: Rosids
- Order: Malvales
- Family: Malvaceae
- Genus: Diplodiscus
- Species: D. scortechinii

Binomial name
- Diplodiscus scortechinii (King) Ashton ex Kochummen

Synonyms
- Pentace scortechinii King

Species of tree

Diplodiscus scortechinii is a species of flowering plant in the family Malvaceae sensu lato. It is a tree found in Peninsular Malaysia and Borneo.
