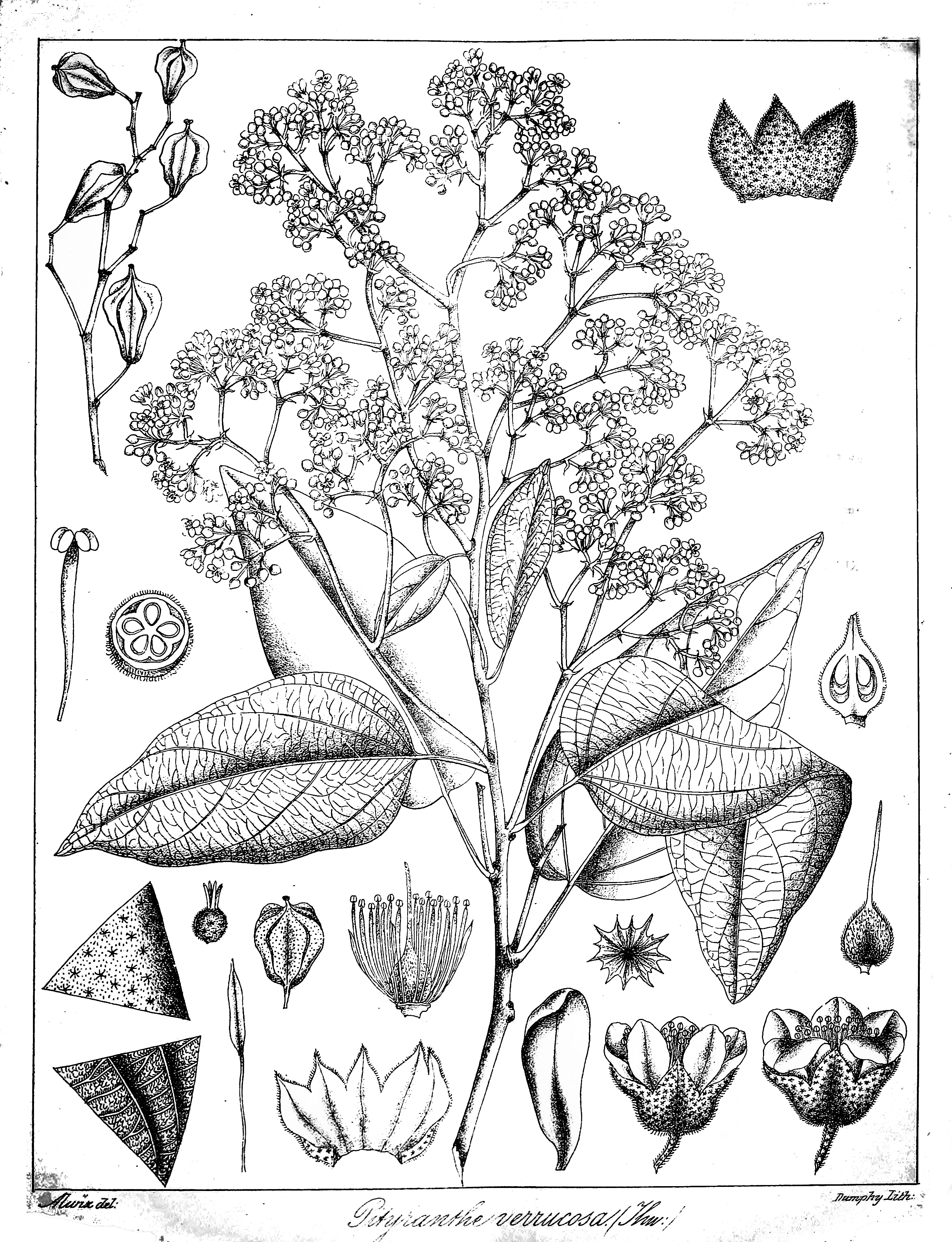
- Pityranthe verrucosa

Scientific classification
- Kingdom: Plantae
- Clade: Tracheophytes
- Clade: Angiosperms
- Clade: Eudicots
- Clade: Rosids
- Order: Malvales
- Family: Malvaceae
- Subfamily: Brownlowioideae
- Genus: Pityranthe; Thwaites

Synonyms
- Hainania Merr.

= Pityranthe =

Genus of plants

Pityranthe is a genus of flowering plants belonging to the family Malvaceae.

Its native range is China (Guangxi) to Hainan, Sri Lanka.

Species:

- Pityranthe trichosperma (Merr.) Kubitzki
- Pityranthe verrucosa Thwaites
