= Nyah Kur language =

Austroasiatic language of Thailand

Nyah Kur
- ญัฮกุร
- Native to: Thailand
- Native speakers: 1,500 (2006)
- Language family: Austroasiatic: Monic; Nyah Kur
- Early form: Old Mon
- Dialects: Chaiyaphum; Petchabun
- Writing system: Thai script

Language codes
- ISO 639-3: cbn
- Glottolog: nyah1250
- ELP: Nyahkur
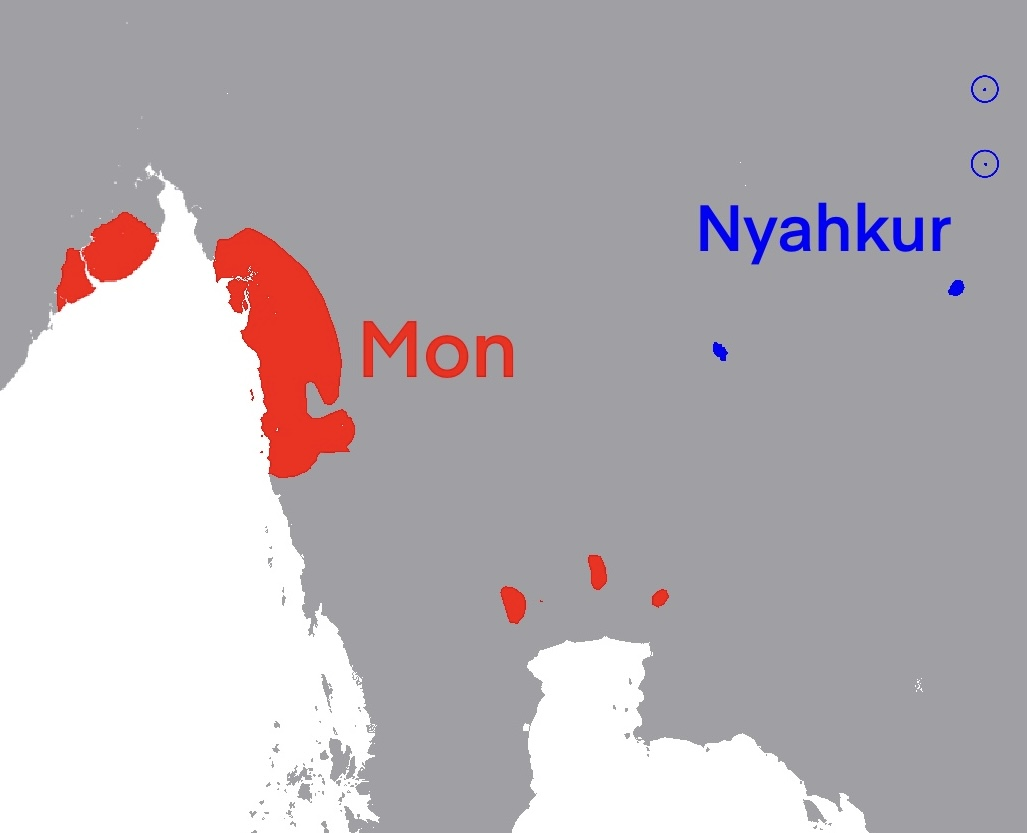
- Monic languages distribution in Thailand and Myanmar where Nyah Kur is denoted by blue area.

The Nyah Kur language, also called Chao-bon (Thai: ชาวบน), is an Austroasiatic language spoken by remnants of the Mon people of Dvaravati, the Nyah Kur people, who live in present-day Thailand. Nyah Kur shares 69% lexical similarity with Mon, the only other language in the Monic language family.

== Distribution ==
Nyah Kur (ɲɑ̤h kur) is spoken by a few thousand people in the central and northeastern provinces (Sidwell 2009:113-114). According to Premsrirat (2002), there are 4,000 to 6,000 speakers of Nyah Kur, the vast majority living in Chaiyaphum Province. The northern dialects of Phetchabun Province are highly endangered.

Southern dialects

- Chaiyaphum Province
- Nakhon Ratchasima Province (Dan Khun Thot District, Pak Thong Chai District, and Khong District)

Northern dialects

- Phetchabun Province (Ban Thaduang, etc.)
- Phitsanulok Province (Nakhon Thai District)

The northern-southern bipartite classification is from Theraphan Luangthongkum's 1984 multi-dialectal Nyah Kur dictionary. However, Gerard Diffloth considers Nyah Kur to be made up of three dialects, namely North, Central, and South.

== Classification ==
Being the only languages of the Monic branch of the Mon–Khmer language family, Mon and Nyah Kur are very closely related.

== History ==
The modern speakers of Nyah Kur are generally considered descendants of Monic-speaking populations associated with the former Dvaravati region who remained in present-day Thailand as Khmer influence expanded into the area between the 9th and 11th centuries. Nyah Kur and modern Mon subsequently developed separately from earlier Monic stages for nearly a millennium. Historical linguists have found that the Nyah Kur language currently spoken bears such a striking resemblance to the Old Mon language found in Dvaravati inscriptions discovered in Thailand that they may be regarded as the same language.

Due to integration into Thai society, the number of speakers of Nyah Kur as a first language is rapidly decreasing. Some predict the language will become extinct within the next century unless the current course is reversed. Language change influenced by Thai is also occurring as younger generations pronounce certain phonemes different from older generations. For instance, final -/r/ and -/l/, which do not occur as finals in Thai, are now often pronounced as -[n] by younger generations (Premsrirat 2002). However, since the younger generations also generally have positive attitudes about their language and support the idea of having an orthography for Nyah Kur, the language may be preserved (Premsrirat 2002).

== Phonology ==
=== Consonants ===
	Bilabial	Dental	Palatal	Velar	Glottal
Stops	p pʰ b	t tʰ d	c cʰ	k kʰ	ʔ
Fricatives	(f)	(s)	ç		h
Nasals	m̥ m	n̥ n	ɲ	ŋ̊ ŋ	
Approximant	ʍ w	l̥ l	j		
Trill		r̥ r			

=== Vowels ===
	Front	Central	Back	
	Front	Central	unround	round
Close	i iː		ɯ ɯː	u uː
Mid	e eː		ɤ ɤː	o oː
Open	ɛ ɛː	a aː	ʌ	ɔ ɔː

- All vowels can have breathy voice e.g. /a̤/

==== Diphthongs ====
	Front	Back	
	Front	unround	round
Close	ia	ua	ɯa

== Orthography ==
Nyah Kur is written in the Thai alphabet. Here the Thai Nyah Kur orthography will be shown side by side with a mix of traditional Mon and Khamti script. Mon being the only extant linguistic relative of Nyah Kur within the Monic branch of Austroasiatic languages and Khamti being close relative of Standard Thai, the likes of which has influenced Nyah Kur greatly in terms of phonology, but unlike Thai, uses a derivative of the Mon-Burmese script similar to Mon.

=== Consonants ===
- ก/က - [k]
- ค/ခ - [kʰ]
- ง/ၚ - [ŋ]
- จ/စ - [c]
- ช/ဆ - [cʰ]
- ญ/ဉ - [ɲ]
- ด/ဒ - [d]
- ต/တ - [t]
- ท/ထ - [tʰ]
- น/န - [n]
- บ/ၜ - [b]
- ป/ပ - [p]
- พ/ဖ - [pʰ]
- ฟ/ꩯ - [f]
- ม/မ - [m]
- ย/ယ - [j]
- ร/ရ - [r]
- ล/လ - [l]
- ว/ဝ - [w]
- ซ/သ - [ç/s]
- ฮ/ဟ - [h]
- ฮง/ငှ - [ŋ̊]
- ฮน/နှ - [n̥]
- ฮม/မှ - [m̥]
- ฮร/ရှ - [r̥]
- ฮล/လှ - [l̥~l]
- ฮว/ဝှ - [ʍ]
- อ/အ - [ʔ][Placeholder]

=== Vowels ===
- อะ,อั/ ႊ - [a]
- อา/ ာ - [aː]
- อิ/ ိ - [i]
- อี/ ဳ - [iː]
- อึ/ ို - [ɯ]
- อื/ ိုဝ် - [ɯː]
- อุ/ ု - [u]
- อู/ ူ - [uː]
- เอ็/ ေ - [e]
- เอ/ ေဝ်- [eː]
- แอะ/ ႄ - [ɛ]
- แอ/ ႄဝ် - [ɛː]
- โอะ,โอ็/ ဴ - [o]
- โอ/ ဴဝ် - [oː]
- เอาะ,อ็อ/ ွ - [ɔ]
- ออ/ ွဝ် - [ɔː]
- เออะ/ ိူ - [ɤ]
- เออ,เอิ/ ိူဝ် - [ɤː]
- เอ็อ/ ဵု - [ʌ]
- เอา/ ်ွ - [aw]
- เอีย/ ႅ - [iə]
- เอือ/ ိုဝ် - [ɯə]
- อัว,-ว-/ ွ - [uə]
