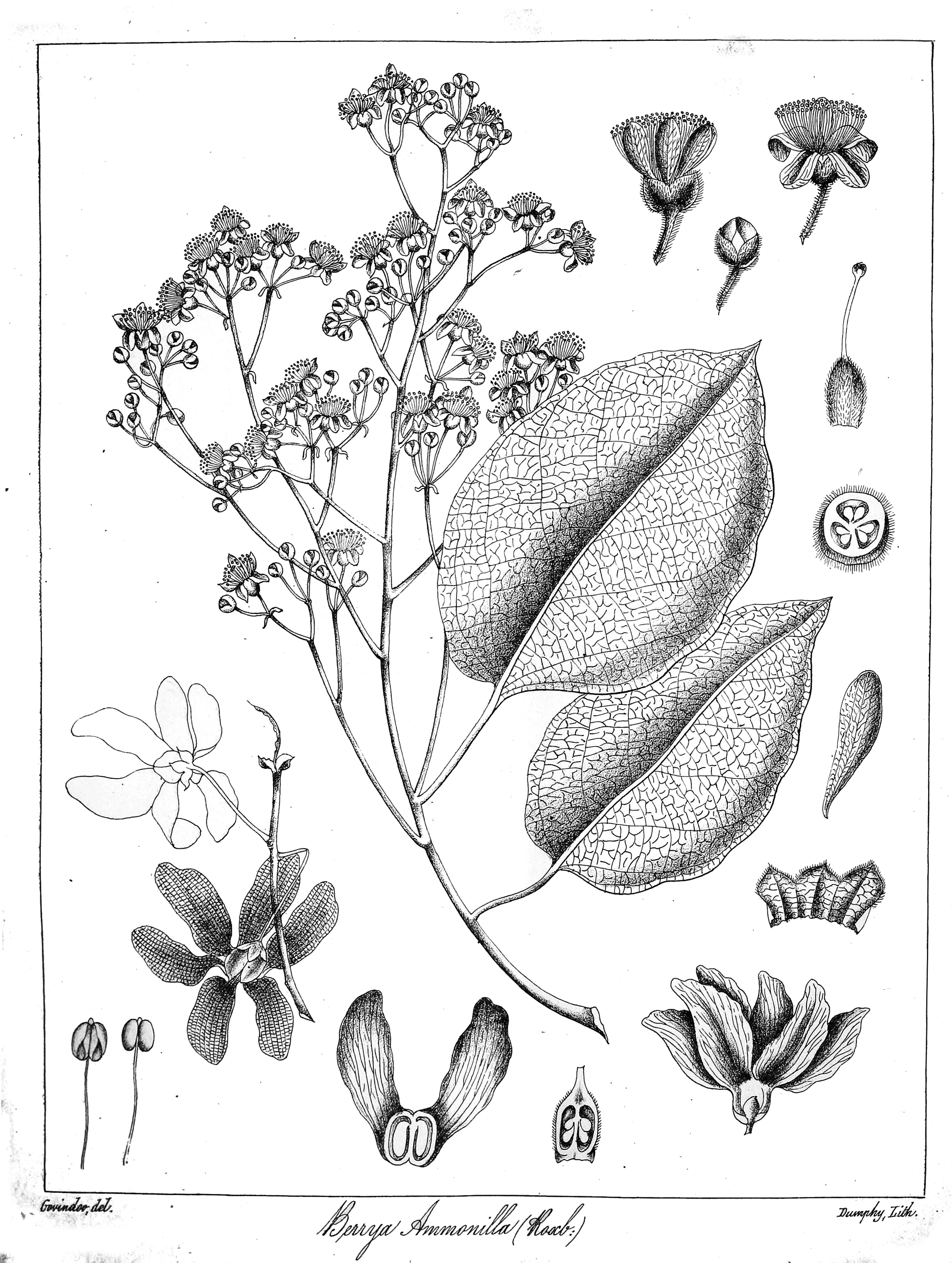

Scientific classification
- Kingdom: Plantae
- Clade: Embryophytes
- Clade: Tracheophytes
- Clade: Angiosperms
- Clade: Eudicots
- Clade: Rosids
- Order: Malvales
- Family: Malvaceae
- Genus: Berrya
- Species: B. cordifolia

Binomial name
- Berrya cordifolia (Willd.) Burret

Synonyms
- Berrya ammonilla Roxb.; Espera cordifolia Willd.; Triopterys poliandra Blanco

= Berrya cordifolia =

Trincomalee wood

Species of flowering plant

Berrya cordifolia, the Trincomalee wood, is a species of tree native to much of tropical Asia and introduced to Africa. It is also found in the forests of Christmas Island. It is widely used for timber, and its bark is used for fibers. The wood has a number of uses, including furniture and historical applications in shipbuilding. It grows up to 27 meters tall.

The tree is known as Halmilla (හල්මිල්ල) in Sri Lanka, and the wood is traditionally used to make vats in which Coconut Arrack is stored and aged after distillation, as this adds desirable qualities to the mature spirit.
