= Brownlowia emarginata =

Scientific classification
- Kingdom: Plantae
- Clade: Tracheophytes
- Clade: Angiosperms
- Clade: Eudicots
- Clade: Rosids
- Order: Malvales
- Family: Malvaceae
- Genus: Brownlowia
- Species: B. emarginata

Binomial name
- Brownlowia emarginata Pierre, Fl. Forest. Cochinch. t. 131 (1888)

Species of flowering plant

Brownlowia emarginata is a slightly climbing tree, a member of the family Malvaceae. It occurs in Vietnam, Cambodia, Laos and Thailand.

In southern Vietnam and Cambodia, B. emarginata, usually a "slightly climbing" tree, sometimes a long liana, occurs in deciduous dense forests. This treelet is found frequently as an understorey species in the Deciduous Dipterocarp Forest (canopy dominated by 5 Dipterocarpaceae species) occurring in small areas in the Phnom Kulen National Park, Siem Reap Province, Cambodia. It is recorded from Khong District in Champasak Province, southwestern Laos.

The leaves of the tree are non-peltate, in common with only 14 other Brownlowia species in Southeast Asia.

One of the vernacular names by which the plant is known is ach' sat' (Khmer, ="bird droppings", alluding to shape of the fruit), or archsatt.

The wood, reddish in colour, is valued highly for rafters, pillars, tool handles and other building uses in Cambodia. Charcoal made from the wood is excellent.
