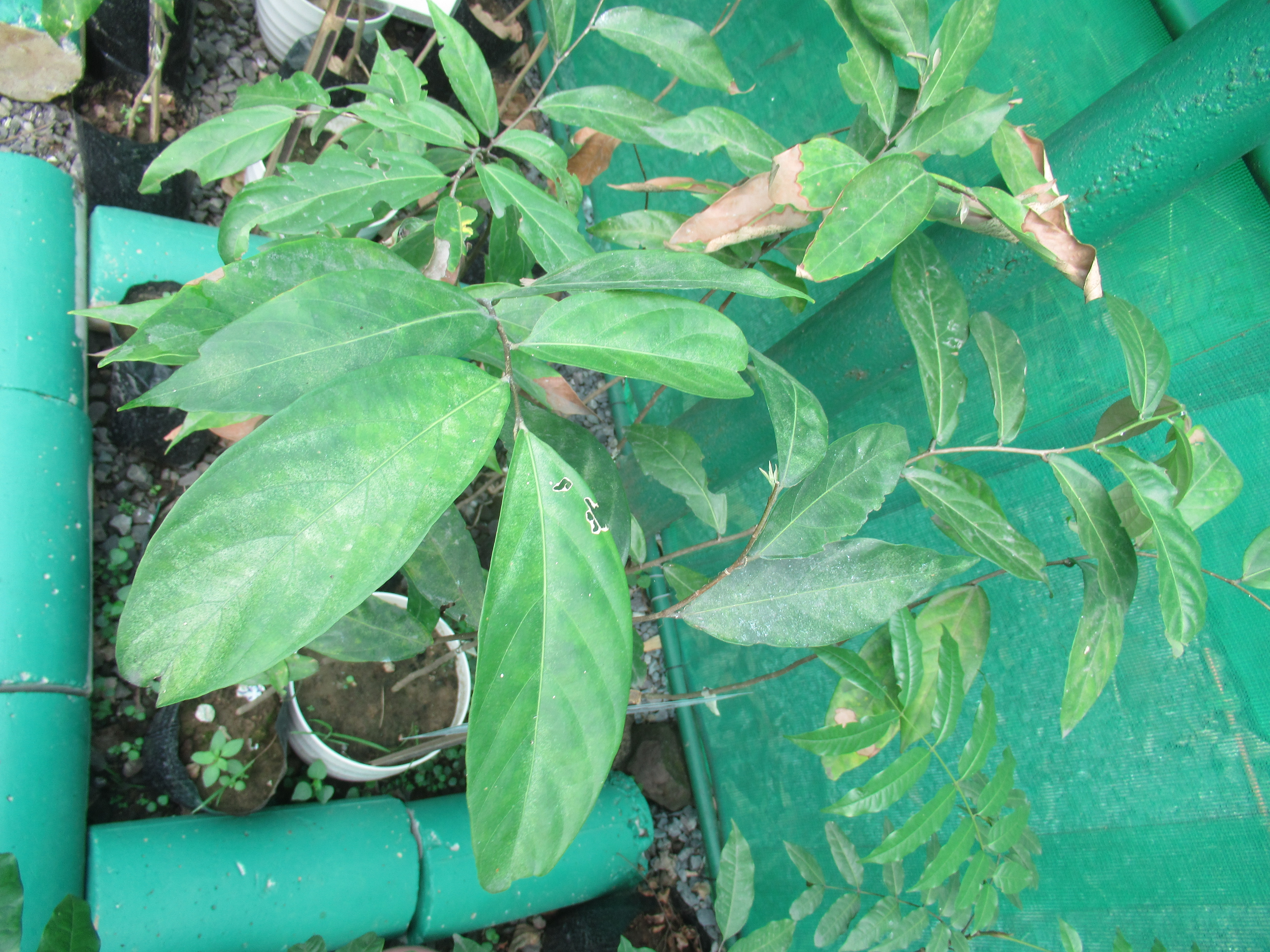
- Diplodiscus paniculatus seedling (Philippines)

Conservation status
- Least Concern (IUCN 3.1)

Scientific classification
- Kingdom: Plantae
- Clade: Tracheophytes
- Clade: Angiosperms
- Clade: Eudicots
- Clade: Rosids
- Order: Malvales
- Family: Malvaceae
- Genus: Diplodiscus
- Species: D. paniculatus

Binomial name
- Diplodiscus paniculatus Turcz.

= Diplodiscus paniculatus =

Species of flowering plant

Diplodiscus paniculatus is a species of flowering plant in the family Malvaceae sensu lato or Tiliaceae. It is found only in the Philippines. It is threatened by habitat loss.
