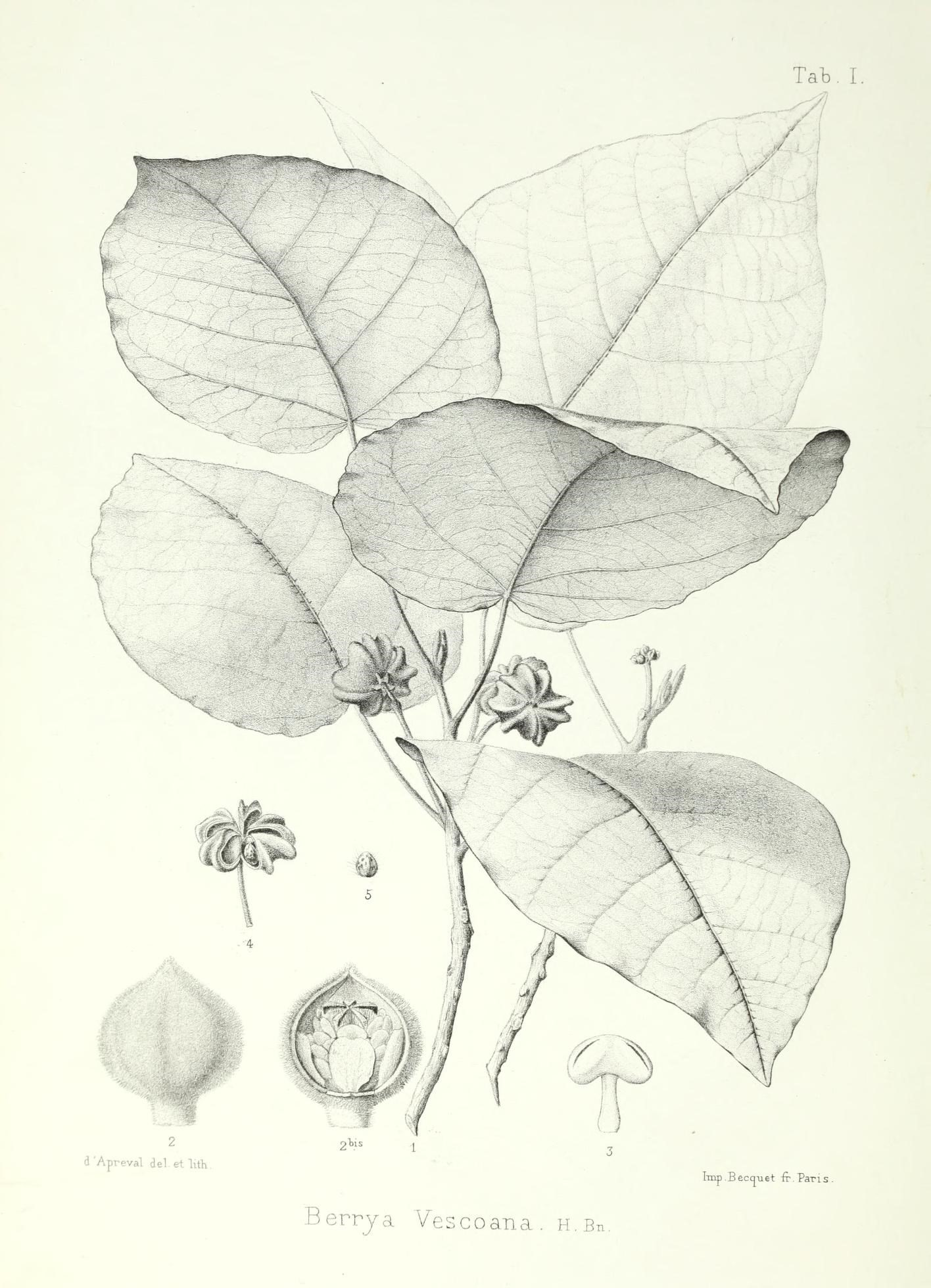
- Illustrationes florae insularum Maris Pacifici

Conservation status
- Endangered (IUCN 3.1)

Scientific classification
- Kingdom: Plantae
- Clade: Embryophytes
- Clade: Tracheophytes
- Clade: Angiosperms
- Clade: Eudicots
- Clade: Rosids
- Order: Malvales
- Family: Malvaceae
- Genus: Christiana
- Species: C. vescoana

Binomial name
- Christiana vescoana (Baill.) Kubitzki

Synonyms
- Berrya tahitensis (Nadeaud) Drake; Berrya vescoana Baill.; Entelea tahitensis Nadeaud; Tahitia tahitensis (Nadeaud) S.L.Welsh; Tahitia vescoana (Baill.) Burret

= Christiana vescoana =

Species of flowering plant

Christiana vescoana is a species of plant in the family Malvaceae. It is endemic to the Society Islands (Moorea and Tahiti) in French Polynesia.
