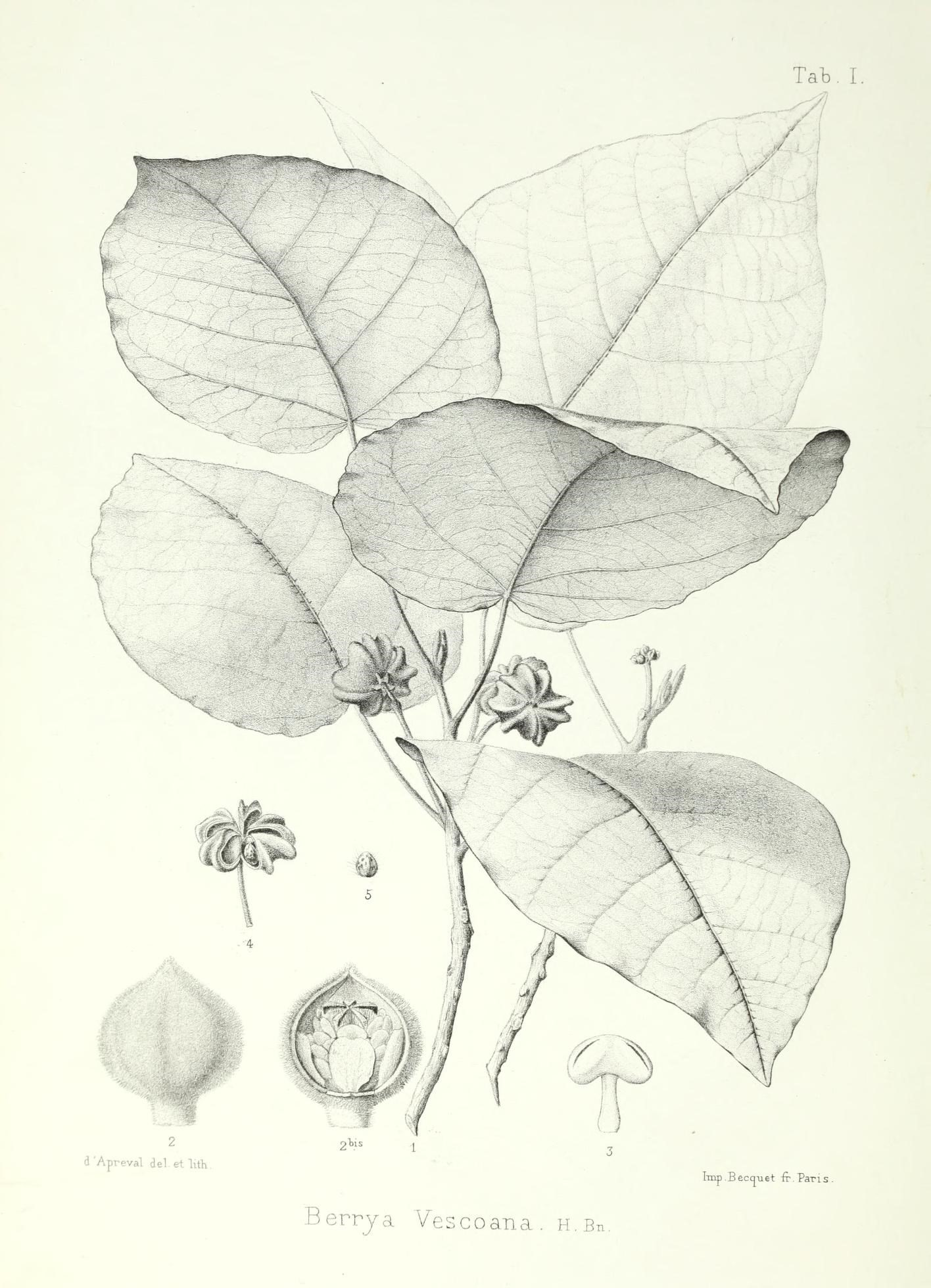
- Christiana vescoana

Scientific classification
- Kingdom: Plantae
- Clade: Tracheophytes
- Clade: Angiosperms
- Clade: Eudicots
- Clade: Rosids
- Order: Malvales
- Family: Malvaceae
- Subfamily: Brownlowioideae
- Genus: Christiana; DC.

Synonyms
- Asterophorum Sprague

= Christiana (plant) =

Genus of flowering plants

Christiana is a genus of flowering plants in the family Malvaceae.

Species accepted by the Plants of the World Online as of September 2021:

- Christiana africana DC.
- Christiana eburnea (Sprague) Kubitzki
- Christiana macrodon Toledo
- Christiana mennegae (Jans.-Jac. & Westra) Kubitzki
- Christiana vescoana (Baill.) Kubitzki
