= Christiana mennegae =

Conservation status
- Vulnerable (IUCN 2.3)

Scientific classification
- Kingdom: Plantae
- Clade: Tracheophytes
- Clade: Angiosperms
- Clade: Eudicots
- Clade: Rosids
- Order: Malvales
- Family: Malvaceae
- Genus: Christiana
- Species: C. mennegae

Binomial name
- Christiana mennegae (Jans.-Jac. & Westra) Kubitzki

Synonyms
- Asterophorum mennegae Jans.-Jac. & Westra

Species of flowering plant

Christiana mennegae is a species of flowering plant in the family Malvaceae. It is found only in Suriname.
