= Brownlowia velutina =

Conservation status
- Endangered (IUCN 2.3)

Scientific classification
- Kingdom: Plantae
- Clade: Tracheophytes
- Clade: Angiosperms
- Clade: Eudicots
- Clade: Rosids
- Order: Malvales
- Family: Malvaceae
- Genus: Brownlowia
- Species: B. velutina

Binomial name
- Brownlowia velutina Kosterm.

Species of tree

Brownlowia velutina is a species of flowering plant in the family Malvaceae. It is a tree endemic to Peninsular Malaysia.
