= Pentace strychnoidea =

Conservation status
- Conservation Dependent (IUCN 2.3)

Scientific classification
- Kingdom: Plantae
- Clade: Tracheophytes
- Clade: Angiosperms
- Clade: Eudicots
- Clade: Rosids
- Order: Malvales
- Family: Malvaceae
- Genus: Pentace
- Species: P. strychnoidea

Binomial name
- Pentace strychnoidea King

Species of tree

Pentace strychnoidea is a species of flowering plant in the family Malvaceae sensu lato. It is a tree endemic to Peninsular Malaysia.
