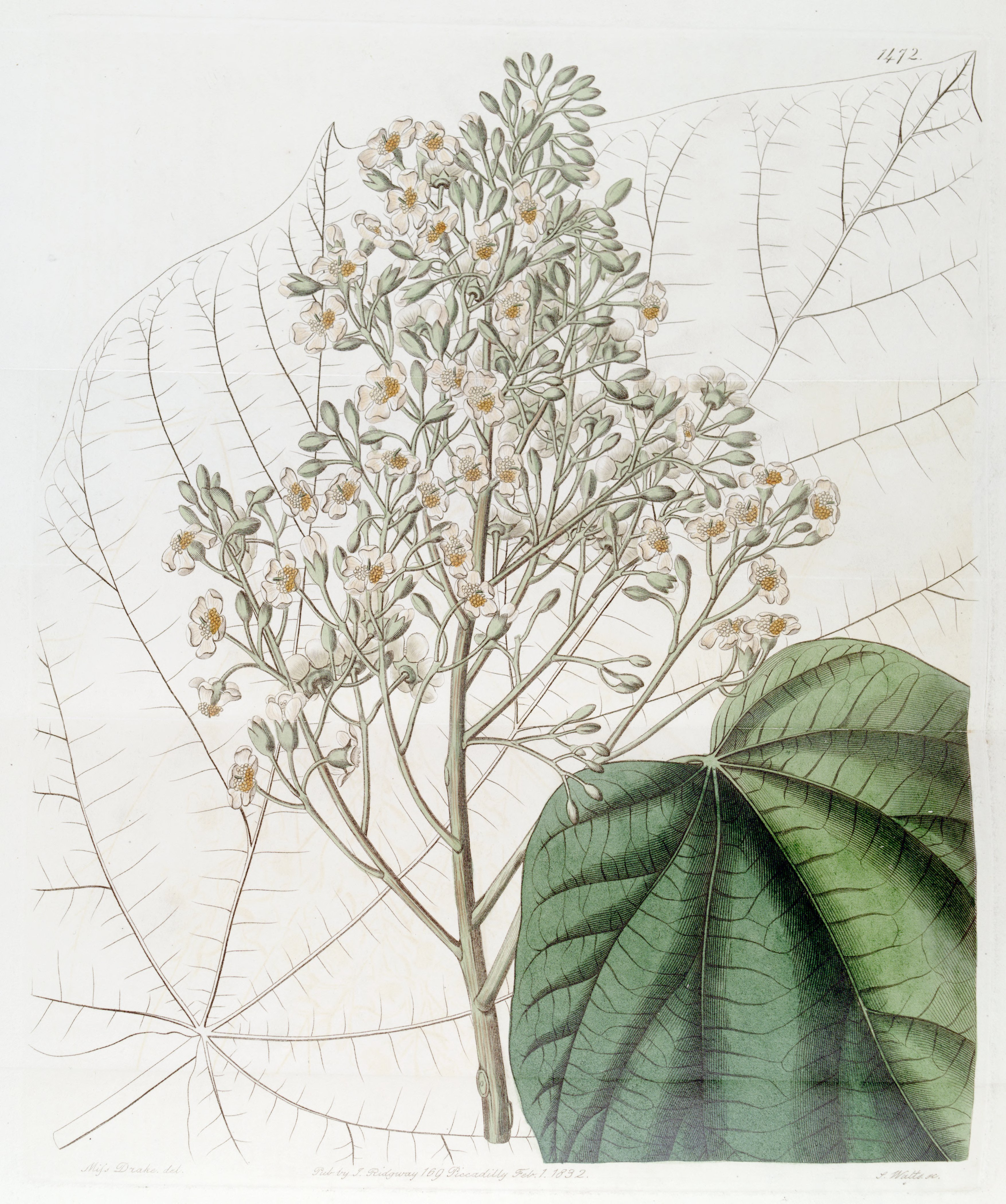
- Brownlowia elata botanical drawing, 1831

Scientific classification
- Kingdom: Plantae
- Clade: Tracheophytes
- Clade: Angiosperms
- Clade: Eudicots
- Clade: Rosids
- Order: Malvales
- Family: Malvaceae
- Subfamily: Brownlowioideae
- Genus: Brownlowia; Roxb. (1820)

Synonyms
- Dialycarpa Mast. (1875); Glabraria L. (1771); Humea Roxb. (1832)

= Brownlowia =

Genus of flowering plants

Brownlowia is a genus of flowering plants in the family Malvaceae. It includes 29 species native to tropical Asia, ranging from India through Indochina and Malesia to New Guinea.

== Species ==
29 species are accepted.

- Brownlowia arachnoidea Kosterm.
- Brownlowia argentata Kurz
- Brownlowia calciphila Kosterm.
- Brownlowia cuspidata Lowe ex Pierre
- Brownlowia eberhardtii (Gagnep.) Kosterm.
- Brownlowia elata Roxb.
- Brownlowia elliptica Ridl.
- Brownlowia emarginata Pierre
- Brownlowia ferruginea Kosterm.
- Brownlowia fluminensis Kosterm.
- Brownlowia glabrata Stapf ex Ridl.
- Brownlowia grandistipulata Kosterm.
- Brownlowia havilandii Stapf
- Brownlowia helferiana Pierre
- Brownlowia kleinhovioidea King
- Brownlowia latifiana R.C.K.Chung
- Brownlowia macrophylla King
- Brownlowia ovalis Kosterm.
- Brownlowia paludosa (Kosterm.) Kosterm.
- Brownlowia palustris Kosterm.
- Brownlowia peltata Benth.
- Brownlowia riparia Ridl.
- Brownlowia rubra Kosterm.
- Brownlowia sarawhensis Pierre
- Brownlowia sarwonoi Kosterm.
- Brownlowia stipulata Kosterm.
- Brownlowia tabularis Pierre
- Brownlowia tersa (L.) Kosterm.
- Brownlowia velutina Kosterm.
