= Diplodiscus hookerianus =

Conservation status
- Endangered (IUCN 2.3)

Scientific classification
- Kingdom: Plantae
- Clade: Tracheophytes
- Clade: Angiosperms
- Clade: Eudicots
- Clade: Rosids
- Order: Malvales
- Family: Malvaceae
- Genus: Diplodiscus
- Species: D. hookerianus

Binomial name
- Diplodiscus hookerianus (King) Kosterm.

Synonyms
- Pentace hookeriana King

Species of tree

Diplodiscus hookerianus is a species of flowering plant in the family Malvaceae sensu lato. It is a tree endemic to Peninsular Malaysia.
