= Somnuekia =

Scientific classification
- Kingdom: Plantae
- Clade: Embryophytes
- Clade: Tracheophytes
- Clade: Spermatophytes
- Clade: Angiosperms
- Clade: Eudicots
- Clade: Rosids
- Order: Malvales
- Family: Malvaceae
- Subfamily: Brownlowioideae
- Genus: Somnuekia; Duangjai, Chalermw., Sinbumr. & Suddee
- Species: S. flaviflora

Binomial name
- Somnuekia flaviflora Duangjai, Chalermw., Sinbumr. & Suddee

Genus of flowering plants

Somnuekia is a genus of flowering plants in the family Malvaceae. It includes a single species, Somnuekia flaviflora, a tree endemic to Peninsular Thailand. The genus and species were described in 2025.
