= Pentace laxiflora =

Conservation status
- Least Concern (IUCN 3.1)

Scientific classification
- Kingdom: Plantae
- Clade: Tracheophytes
- Clade: Angiosperms
- Clade: Eudicots
- Clade: Rosids
- Order: Malvales
- Family: Malvaceae
- Genus: Pentace
- Species: P. laxiflora

Binomial name
- Pentace laxiflora Merr., Philip. J. Sci. 30 (1926)

Species of tree

Pentace laxiflora is a species of flowering plant in the family Malvaceae sensu lato or Tiliaceae. It is a tree endemic to Borneo. Its conservation status has been listed by the International Union for Conservation of Nature as being of least concern.

== Description ==
Pentace laxiflora is a medium-sized tree growing to a height of about 30 m (100 ft), the trunk having a maximum diameter of 50 cm (20 in). The leaves have short stalks with a pair of small stipules at the base, and are alternate, usually hairless, lanceolate and whitish underneath. The inflorescence is a lax panicle with small, widely separated, creamy-coloured flowers, each about 7 mm (0.3 in) in diameter. The seeds are winged nuts, about 14 mm (0.6 in) in diameter.

== Distribution and habitat ==
Pentace laxiflora is endemic to Borneo where it is found in Brunei, Sabah, Sarawak and Kalimantan, its total area of occurrence being about 250,000 km^{2} (96,500 sq mi). It grows in mixed dipterocarp forests, both primary and secondary, at altitudes of up to 600 m (2,000 ft).

== Uses ==
The timber of this tree is used in building and construction, often as a substitute for red meranti (Shorea). Its uses include house, boat and truck building, and the production of tool handles, plywood and veneer.

== Status ==
Much of the lowland dipterocarp forest in Borneo is being cleared for timber and to be used for agriculture and for the establishment of plantations for growing oil palms and pulpwood. How much impact this is having on the populations of Pentace laxiflora is unclear, but it is a common species in at least part of its range, and where it is logged in Malaysia (Sabah and Sarawak), the timber harvesting is managed in forestry concessions. For these reasons, the conservation status of this tree has been assessed by the International Union for Conservation of Nature as being of least concern, as the tree does not currently meet the criteria for a more threatened category.
