= Indagator =

Scientific classification
- Kingdom: Plantae
- Clade: Tracheophytes
- Clade: Angiosperms
- Clade: Eudicots
- Clade: Rosids
- Order: Malvales
- Family: Malvaceae
- Genus: Indagator; Halford (2002)
- Species: I. fordii

Binomial name
- Indagator fordii Halford (2002)

Genus of plants

Indagator is a genus of flowering plants belonging to the family Malvaceae.

Its native range is northeastern Australia.

Species:

- Indagator fordii Halford
