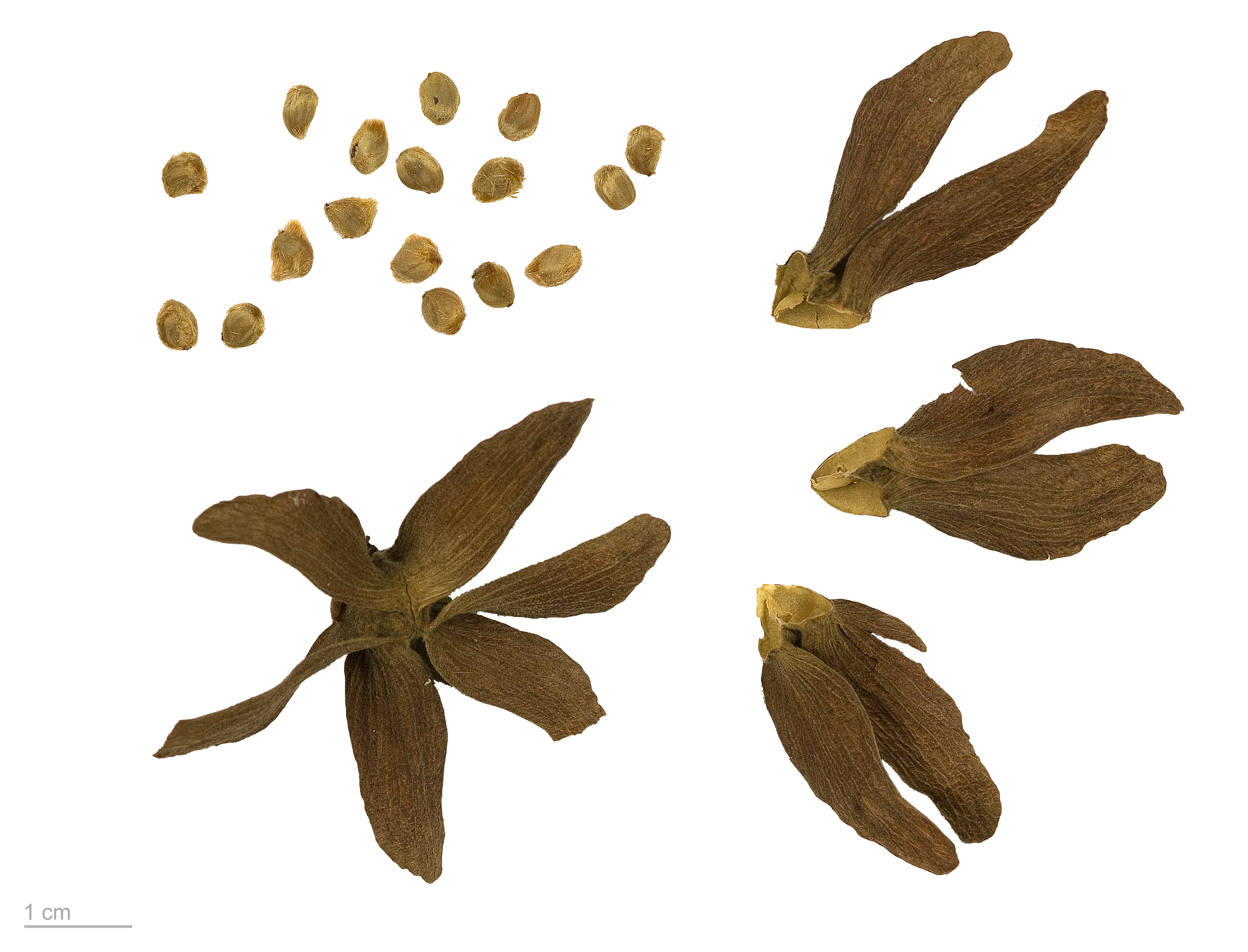
- Berrya cordifolia - MHNT

Scientific classification
- Kingdom: Plantae
- Clade: Tracheophytes
- Clade: Angiosperms
- Clade: Eudicots
- Clade: Rosids
- Order: Malvales
- Family: Malvaceae
- Subfamily: Brownlowioideae
- Genus: Berrya; Roxb. (1819), nom. cons.

Species
- 6; see text

Synonyms
- Berria Roxb. (1820); Espera Willd. (1801); Hexagonotheca Turcz. (1846); Pterocoellion Turcz. (1863)

= Berrya =

Genus of flowering plants

Berrya is a genus of evergreen trees with fibrous bark, which range from tropical Asia to northern Australia and the southwestern Pacific. The plants are valuable for their timber. The flowers are showy, with large tight clusters of green flowers.

== Cultivation ==
Trees from Berrya are propagated from seed and grown in warm temperate or tropical climates.

== Species ==
Six species are accepted.

- Berrya cordifolia (Willd.) Burret
- Berrya javanica (Turcz.) Burret
- Berrya mollis Wall. ex Kurz
- Berrya pacifica A.C.Sm.
- Berrya papuana Merr. & L.M.Perry
- Berrya rotundifolia (Benth.) Domin
