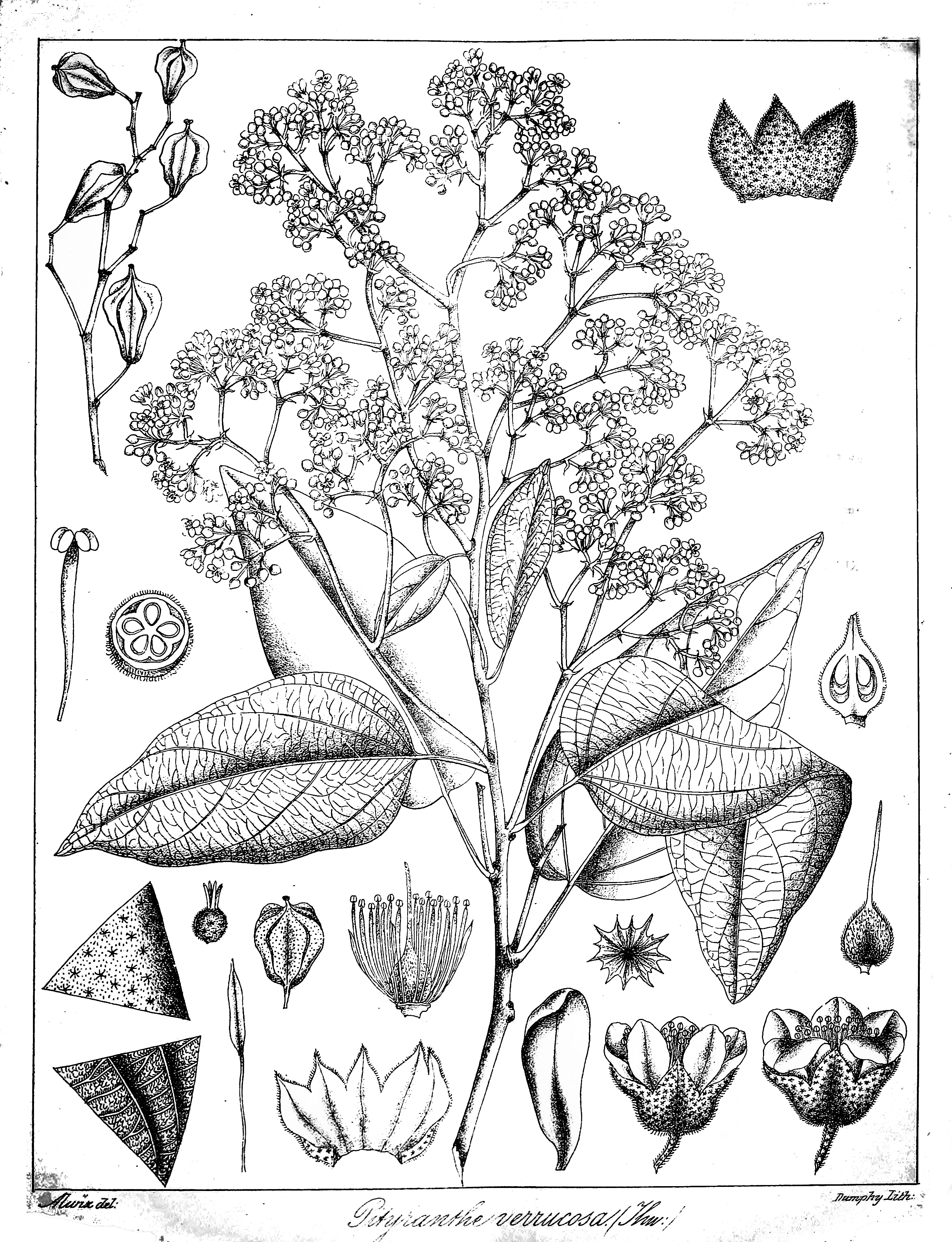

Scientific classification
- Kingdom: Plantae
- Clade: Tracheophytes
- Clade: Angiosperms
- Clade: Eudicots
- Clade: Rosids
- Order: Malvales
- Family: Malvaceae
- Genus: Pityranthe
- Species: P. verrucosa

Binomial name
- Pityranthe verrucosa Thwaites

Synonyms
- Diplodiscus verrucosus (Thwaites) Kosterm.

= Pityranthe verrucosa =

Species of flowering plant

Pityranthe verrucosa (දික්වැන්න) is a species of flowering plant in the family Malvaceae. It is a tree found only in Sri Lanka.

== Culture ==
It is known as "දික්වැන්න - dikwenna" in Sinhala, and as "vidpani" in Tamil.
