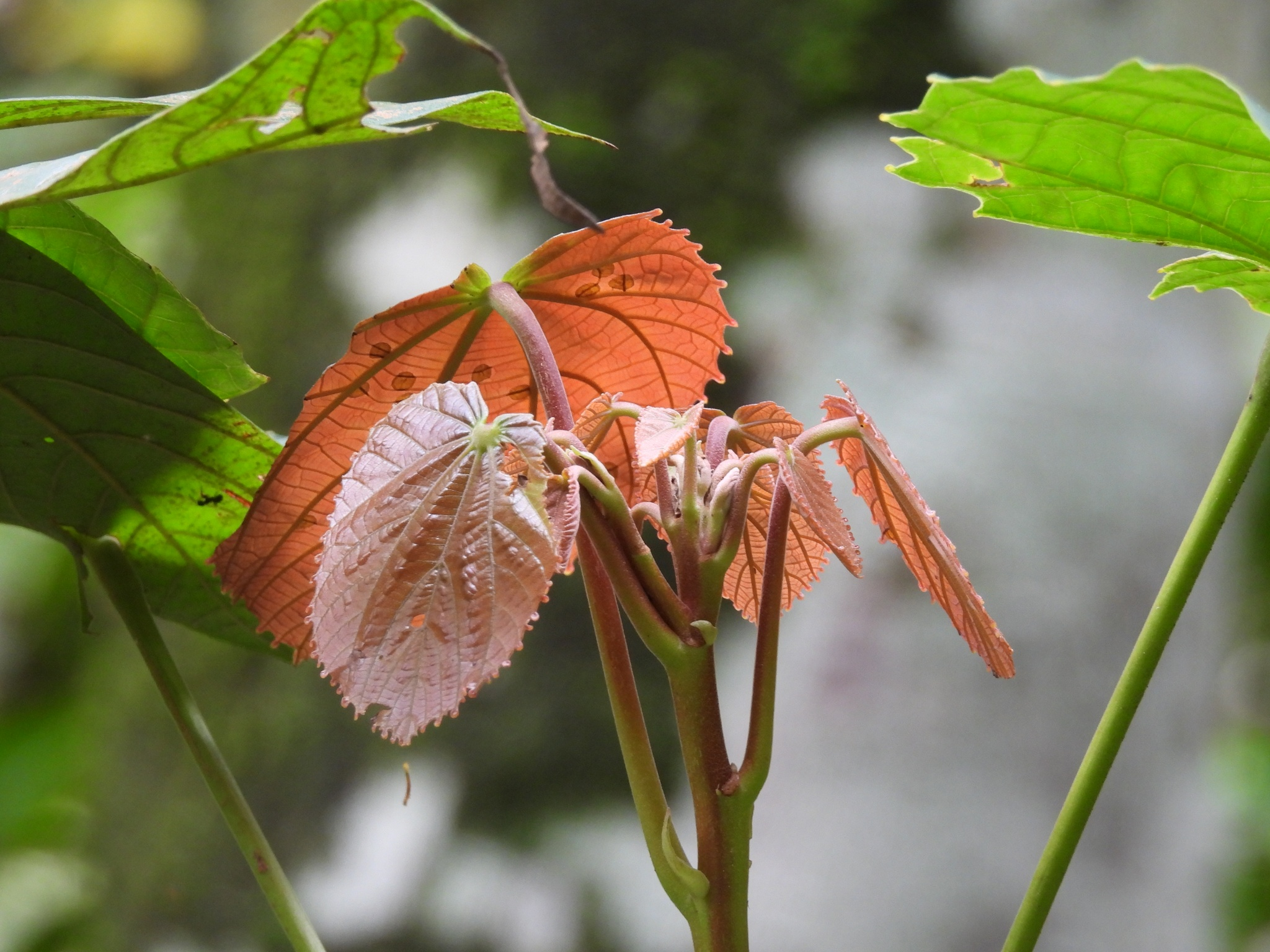
- Pentace microlepidota

Scientific classification
- Kingdom: Plantae
- Clade: Embryophytes
- Clade: Tracheophytes
- Clade: Angiosperms
- Clade: Eudicots
- Clade: Rosids
- Order: Malvales
- Family: Malvaceae
- Subfamily: Brownlowioideae
- Genus: Pentace; Hassk.

= Pentace =

Genus of flowering plants

Pentace is a genus of flowering plants in the family Malvaceae sensu lato or Tiliaceae. It includes 30 species native to tropical Asia, ranging from Bangladesh through Indochina and Malesia to the Philippines and the Lesser Sunda Islands.

== Species ==
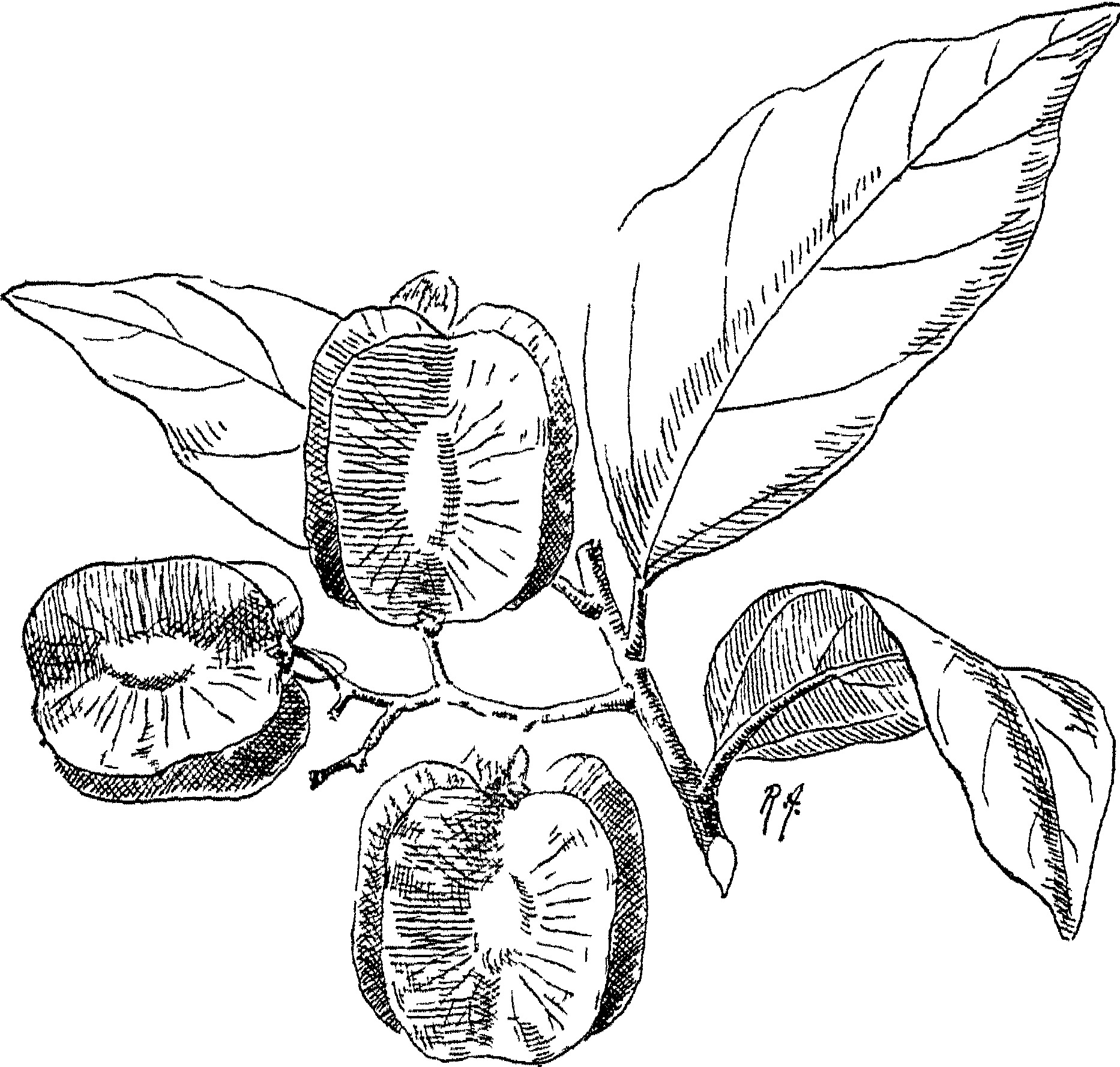
Drawing of Pentace burmanica, 1906

30 species are accepted.

- Pentace acuta Ridl.
- Pentace adenophora Kosterm.
- Pentace borneensis Pierre
- Pentace burmanica Kurz
- Pentace chartacea Kosterm.
- Pentace concolor Merr.
- Pentace cordifolia Ridl.
- Pentace corneri Kosterm.
- Pentace curtisii King
- Pentace discolor Merr.
- Pentace erectinervia Kosterm.
- Pentace excelsa Kochummen
- Pentace exima King
- Pentace floribunda King
- Pentace grandiflora Kochummen
- Pentace griffithii King
- Pentace hirtula Ridl.
- Pentace laxiflora Merr.
- Pentace macrophylla King
- Pentace macroptera Kosterm.
- Pentace microlepidota Kosterm.
- Pentace oligoneura Warb.
- Pentace perakensis King
- Pentace polyantha Hassk.
- Pentace rigida Kosterm.
- Pentace strychnoidea King
- Pentace subintegra (Merr.) Burret
- Pentace sumatrana Kosterm.
- Pentace triptera Mast.
- Pentace truncata Kosterm.
