= Kamarwet =

Kamarwet ကၟာဝက်
- Town
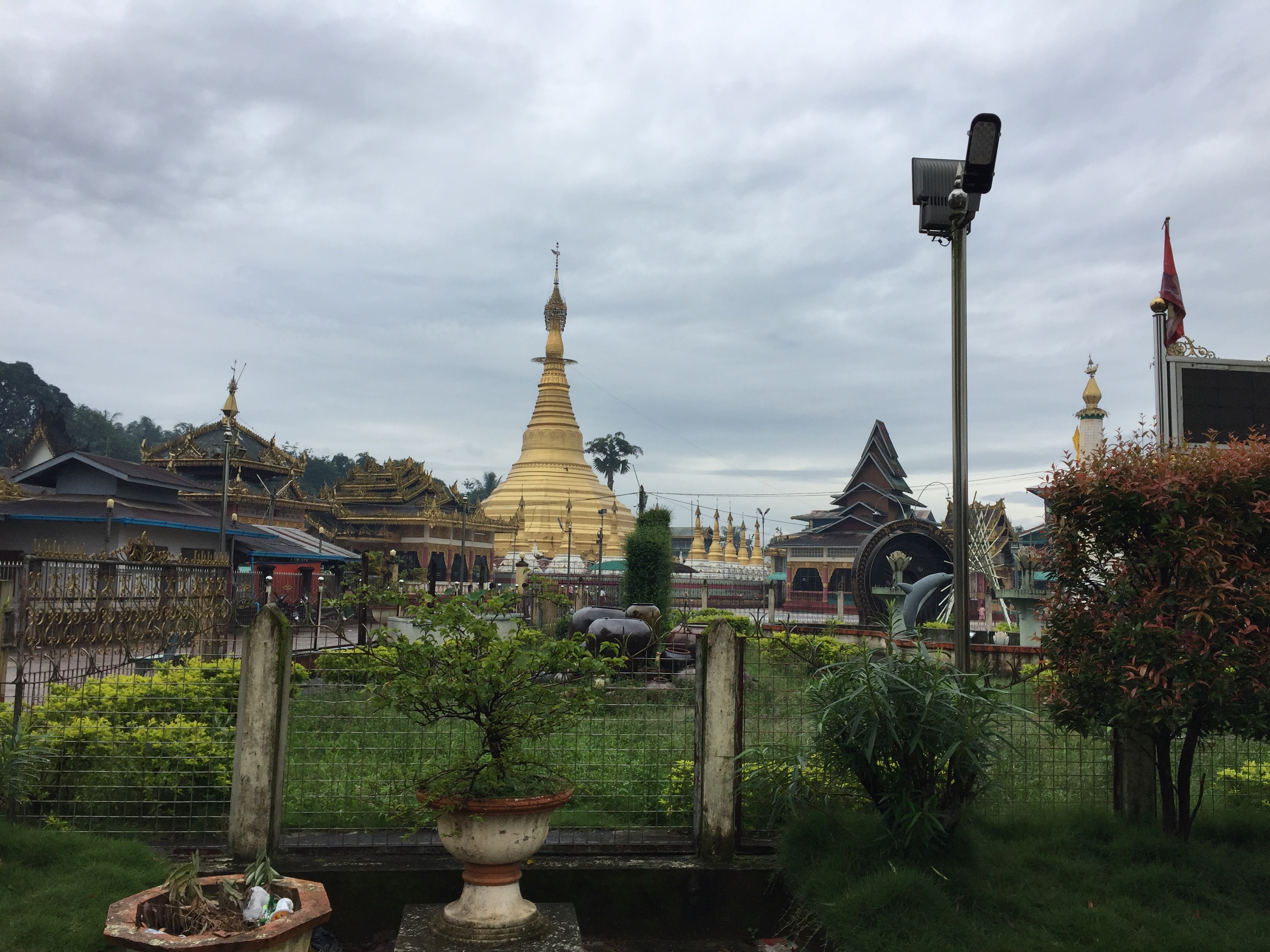

- Kamarwet Location
- Coordinates: 16.140896°N 97.734026°E
- Country: Myanmar
- State: Mon State
- District: Mawlamyine District
- Township: Mudon Township
- Time zone: UTC+6.30 (Myanmar Standard Time)

Kamarwet (Mon: ကၟာဝက်; Burmese: ကမာဝက်) is a town located in Mawlamyine District, Mon State of Myanmar
