= Jarandersonia =

Scientific classification
- Kingdom: Plantae
- Clade: Tracheophytes
- Clade: Angiosperms
- Clade: Eudicots
- Clade: Rosids
- Order: Malvales
- Family: Malvaceae
- Genus: Jarandersonia; Kosterm.

Genus of plants

Jarandersonia is a genus of flowering plants belonging to the family Malvaceae.

It is native to Borneo.

The genus name of Jarandersonia is in honour of James Aidan Robb Anderson (1922–2004), an English forester, botanist and plant collector with the Forestry Service in Sarawak (now in Malaysia). it was first described and published in Reinwardtia Vol.5 on page 319 in 1960.

== Known species ==
According to Kew:

- Jarandersonia clemensiae (Burret) Kosterm.
- Jarandersonia parvifolia Kosterm.
- Jarandersonia pentaceoides R.C.K.Chung & H.S.Tan
- Jarandersonia purseglovei (Kosterm.) Kosterm.
- Jarandersonia rinoreoides Kosterm.
- Jarandersonia spinulosa Kosterm.
- Jarandersonia yahyantha K.M.Wong, Joffre, Ariffin & Y.W.Low
