= Tersigni =

Tersigni is a surname. Notable people with the surname include:

- Ludovico Tersigni (born 1995), Italian actor
- Neliana Tersigni (1945–2026), Italian journalist

== See also ==
- Tersonia
