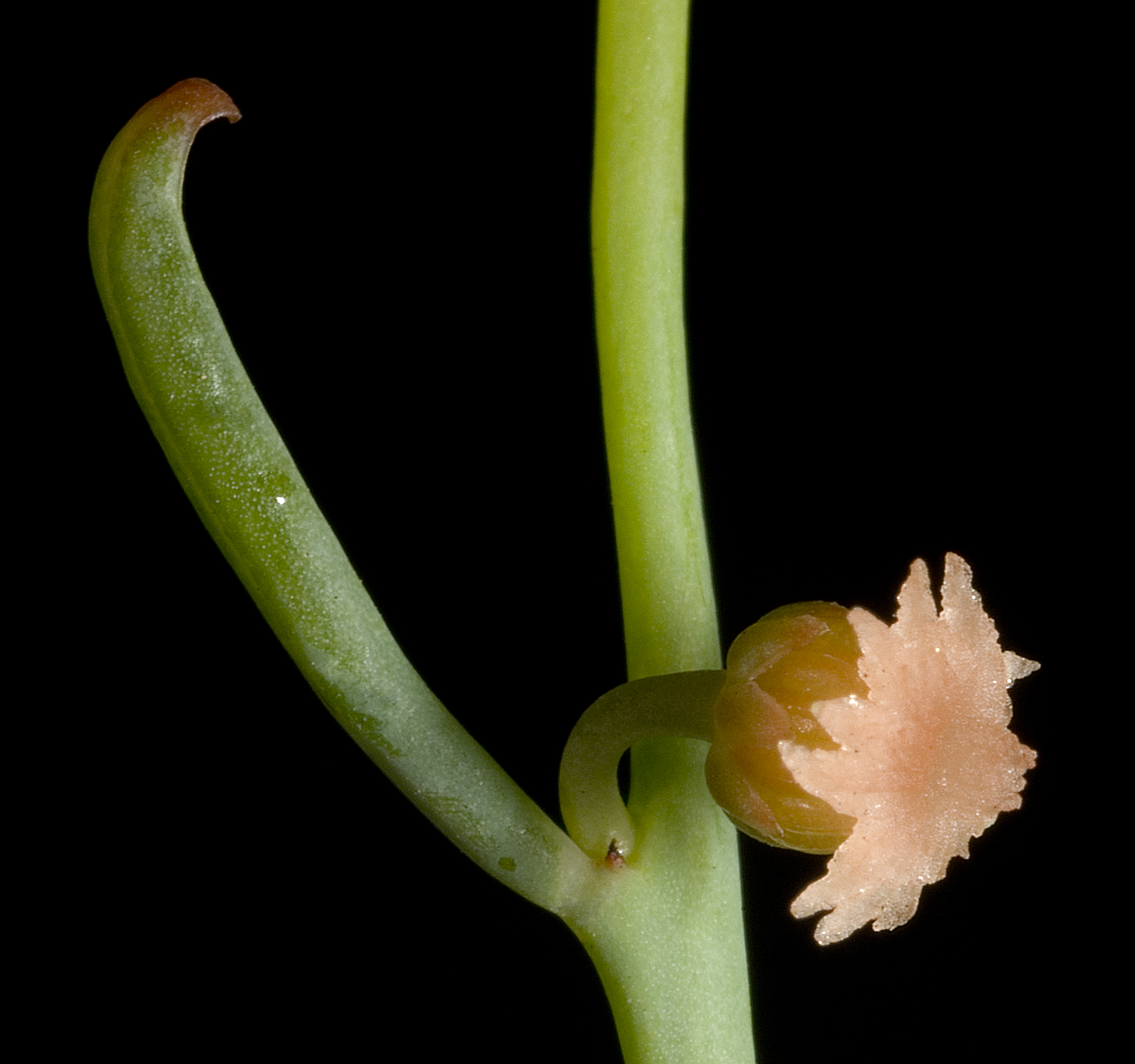
- Female
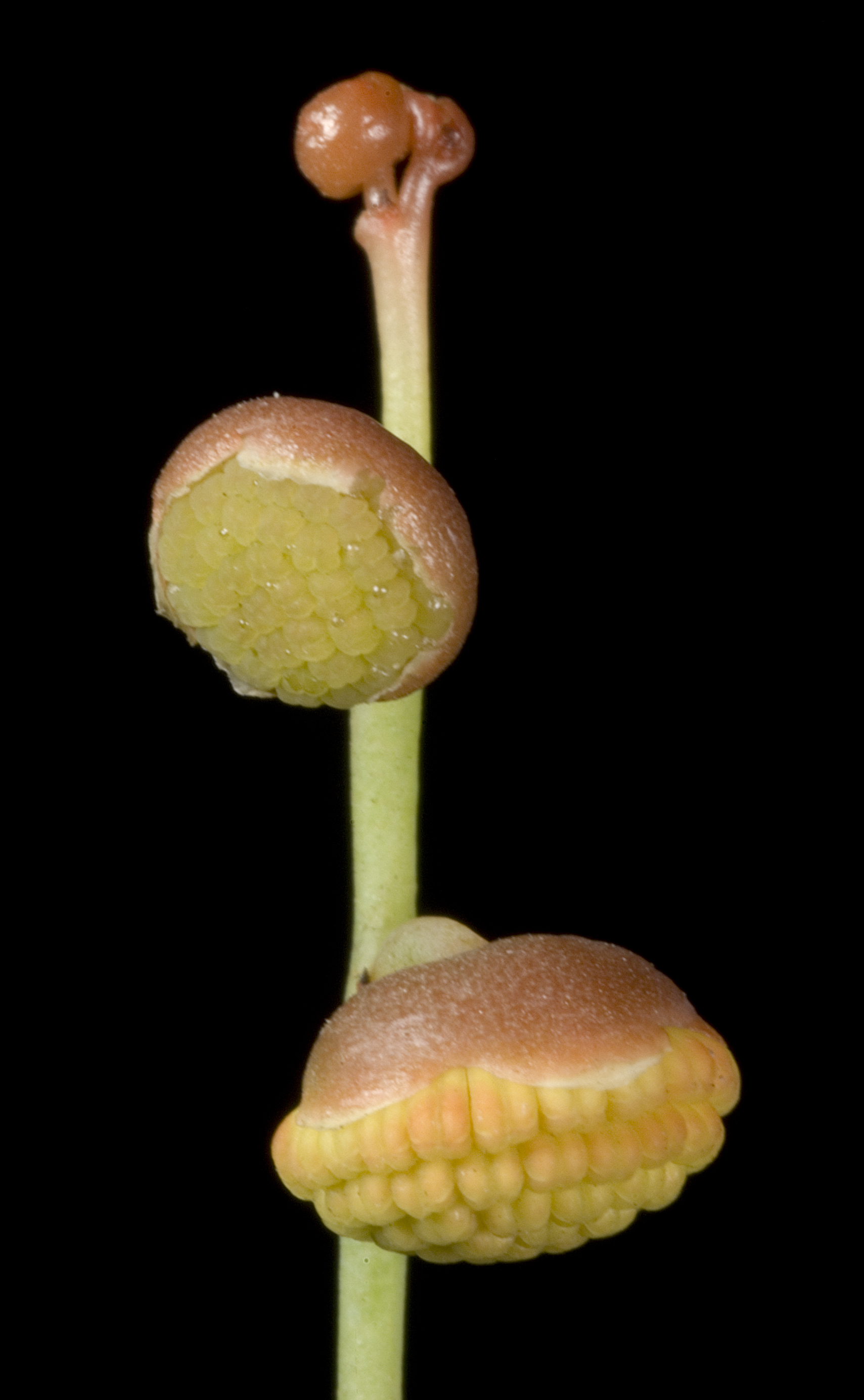
- Male

Scientific classification
- Kingdom: Plantae
- Clade: Tracheophytes
- Clade: Angiosperms
- Clade: Eudicots
- Clade: Rosids
- Order: Brassicales
- Family: Gyrostemonaceae
- Genus: Gyrostemon
- Species: G. racemiger

Binomial name
- Gyrostemon racemiger H.Walter

= Gyrostemon racemiger =

Species of plant

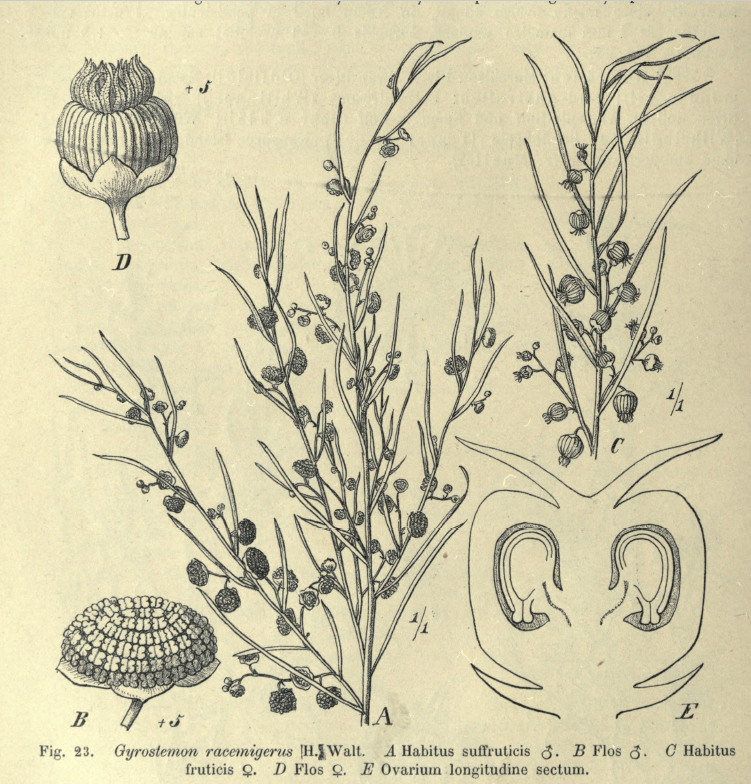
G. racemiger from H.Walter (1909)

Gyrostemon racemiger is a plant in the family Gyrostemonaceae. It was first described in 1909 by Hans Paul Heinrich Walter.

It is native to Western Australia.

== Description ==
Gyrostemon racemiger is a pyramid shaped shrub growing up to 3 m. Its branchlets are orange-pink and glaucous, and the uncrowded leaves are terete. It has swollen stipules which are dark brown but pale at the apex. The flowers occur as axillary racemes, with the male inflorescence having up to 14 flowers, and the female up to 8. The rounded seeds are attached at the base and have prominent transverse ridges, with an aril which extends up to half-way up seed.
