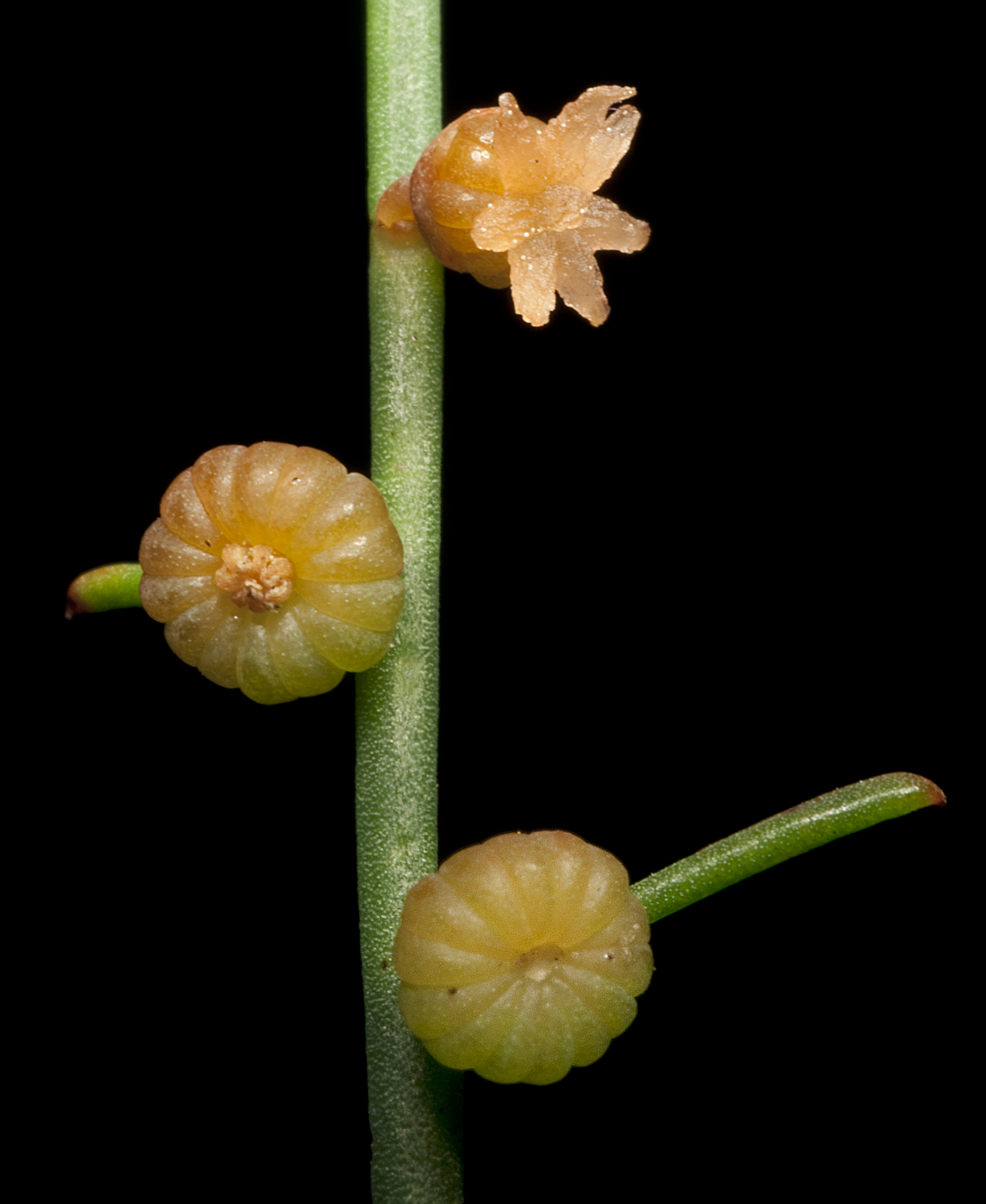
- female
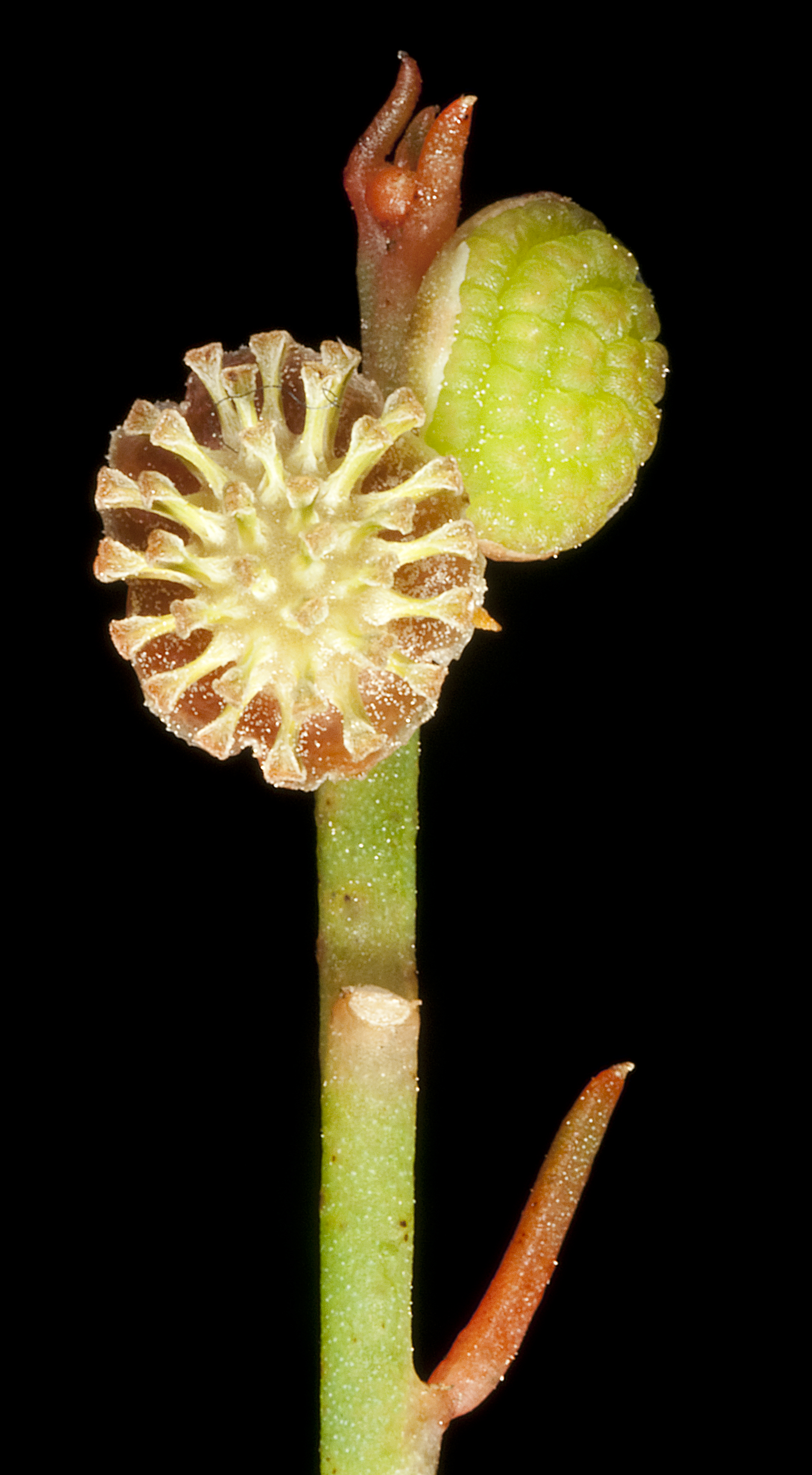
- male

Scientific classification
- Kingdom: Plantae
- Clade: Tracheophytes
- Clade: Angiosperms
- Clade: Eudicots
- Clade: Rosids
- Order: Brassicales
- Family: Gyrostemonaceae
- Genus: Gyrostemon
- Species: G. subnudus

Binomial name
- Gyrostemon subnudus (Nees) Baill.

= Gyrostemon subnudus =

Species of plant

Gyrostemon subnudus is a plant in the family, Gyrostemonaceae. It was first described as Amperea subnuda in 1848 by Nees von Esenbeck, and transferred to the genus, Gyrostemon in 1873 by Henri Ernest Baillon.

It is native to the south-west of Western Australia.

== Description ==
Gyrostemon subnudus is a tangled, many branched shrub which grows up to 2 m. The branchlets are slender and often leafless. Old stems may be corky. The leaves are scattered and terete, and about 10-35 mm long. There are male and female flowers which are axillary and solitary. The orange-brown seeds are round to oblong, and ridged.
