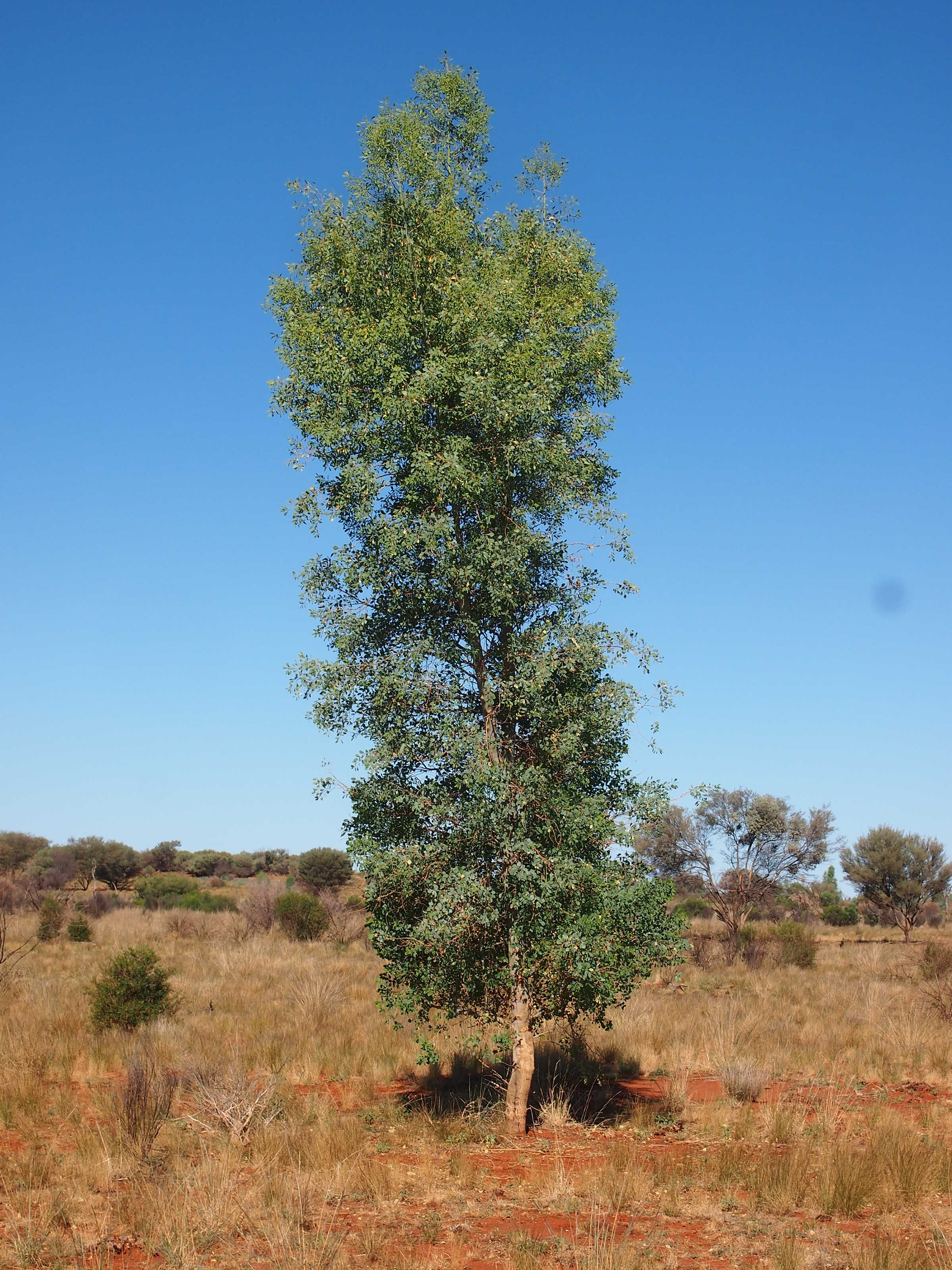

Scientific classification
- Kingdom: Plantae
- Clade: Tracheophytes
- Clade: Angiosperms
- Clade: Eudicots
- Clade: Rosids
- Order: Brassicales
- Family: Gyrostemonaceae
- Genus: Codonocarpus
- Species: C. cotinifolius

Binomial name
- Codonocarpus cotinifolius (Desf.) F,Muell..

Synonyms
- Gyrostemon acaciiformis F.Muell. Gyrostemon cotinifolius Desf. Gyrostemon pungens Lindl. Hymenotheca acaciiformis (F.Muell.) F.Muell. Hymenotheca cotinifolia (Desf.) F.Muell.

= Codonocarpus cotinifolius =

Species of flowering plant

Codonocarpus cotinifolius is a tall shrub or tree in the Gyrostemonaceae family found in all mainland states of Australia, including Victoria, and is also widespread in arid areas. It is suspected of being toxic to stock.

Common names are native poplar (New South Wales, Western Australia), and bell-fruit tree (Victoria)

The species was first described in 1822 as Gyrostemon cotinifolium by René Louiche Desfontaines. In 1862, Ferdinand von Mueller transferred it to the genus, Codonocarpus.

== Conservation status ==
In the Northern Territory and in Queensland the conservation status is of "least concern".

== Gallery ==
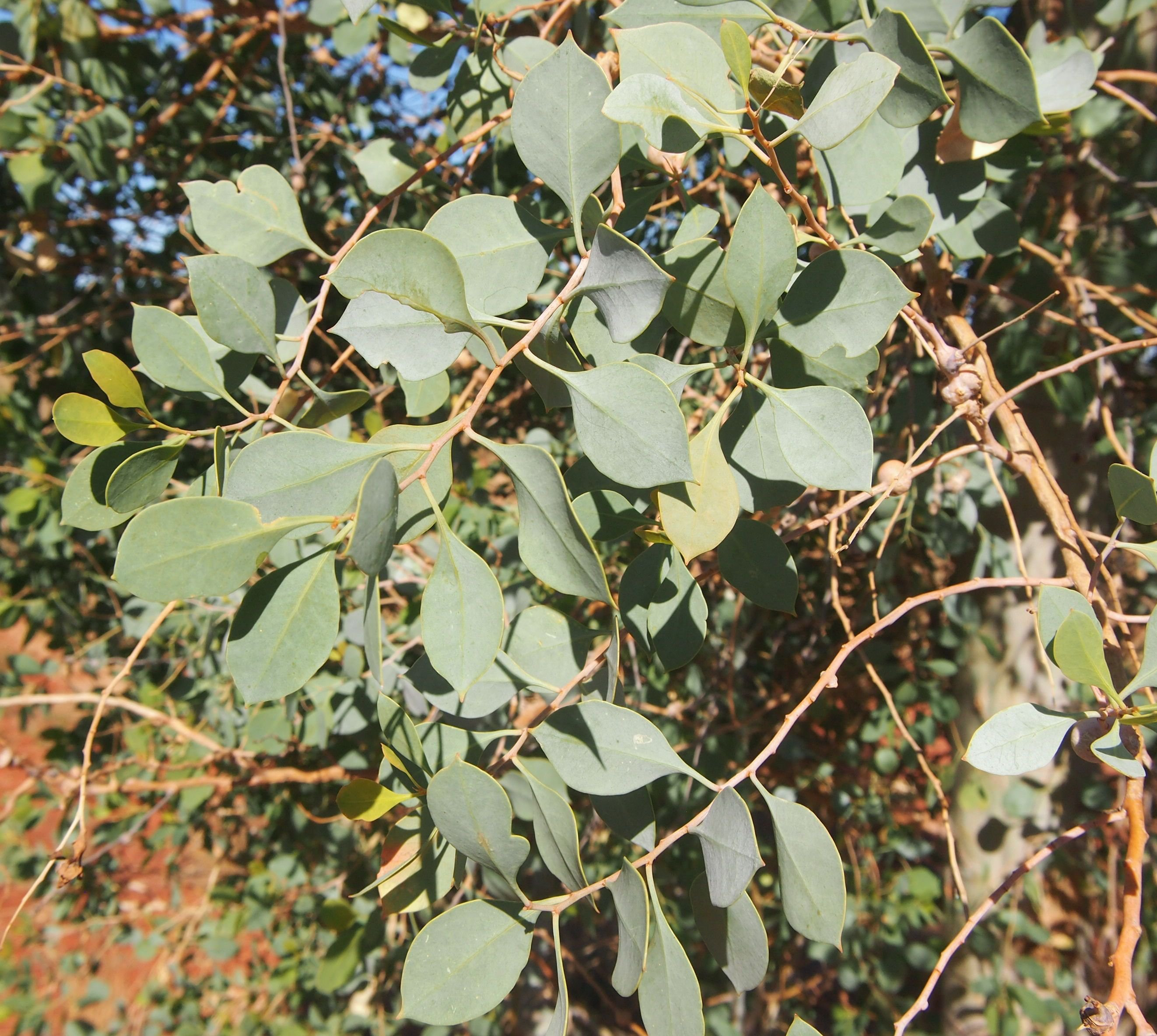

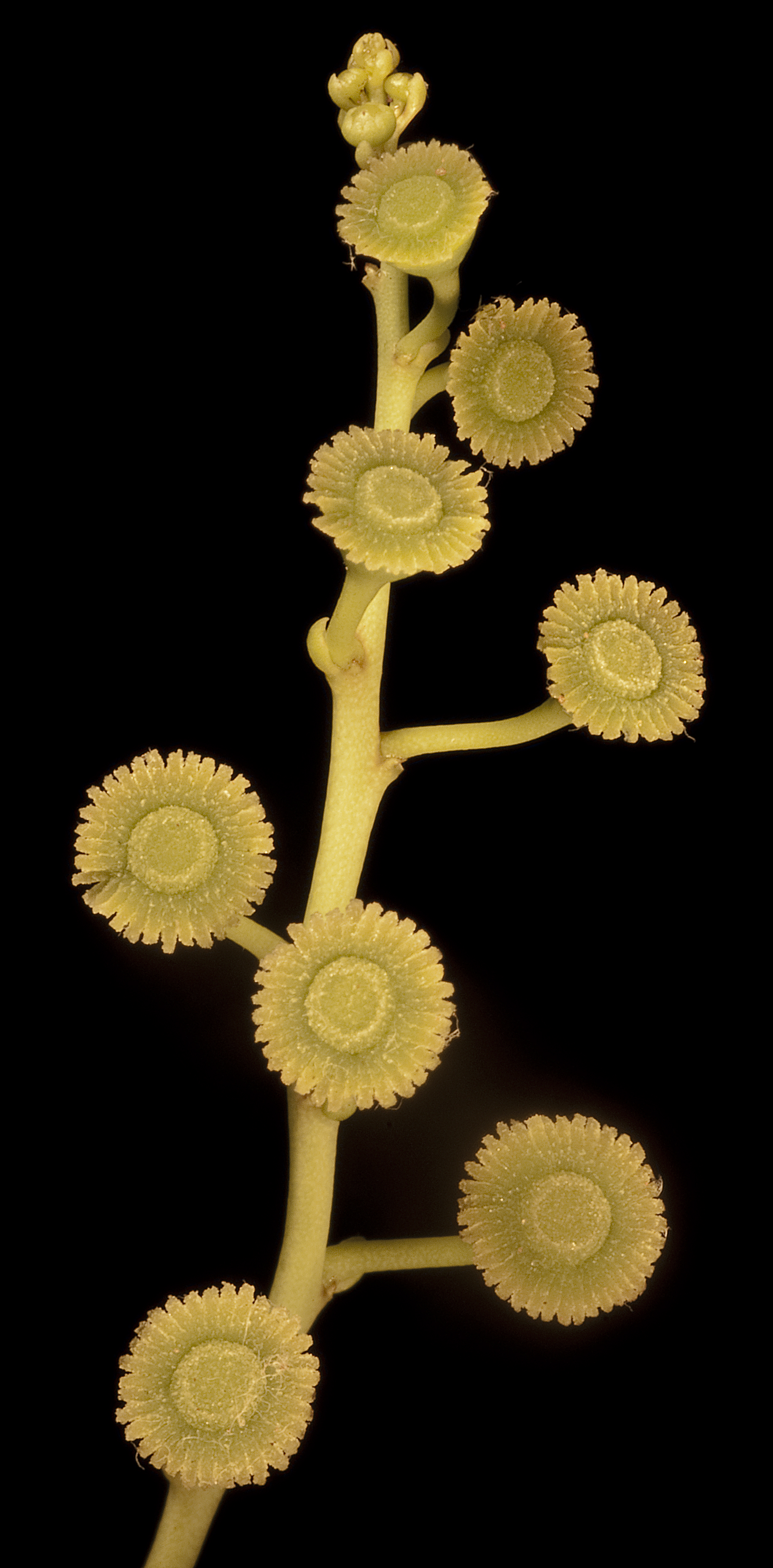

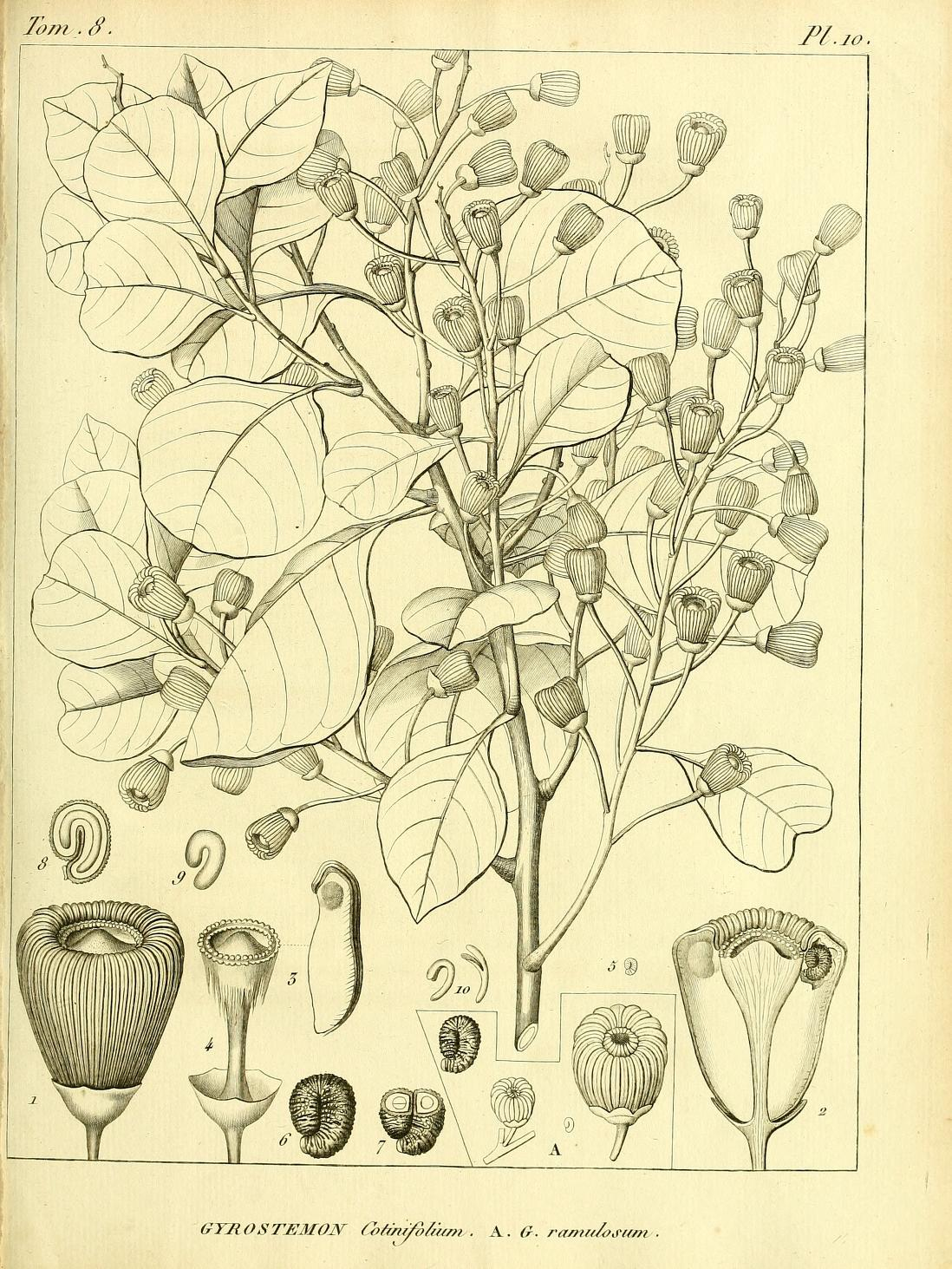
(Desfontaine t.10, 1822
