= Cypselocarpus =

Scientific classification
- Kingdom: Plantae
- Clade: Tracheophytes
- Clade: Angiosperms
- Clade: Eudicots
- Clade: Rosids
- Order: Brassicales
- Family: Gyrostemonaceae
- Genus: Cypselocarpus; F.Muell.

Genus of flowering plants

Cypselocarpus is a genus of flowering plants belonging to the family Gyrostemonaceae.

Its native range is Southwestern Australia.

Species:

- Cypselocarpus haloragoides (F.Muell. ex Benth.) F.Muell.
