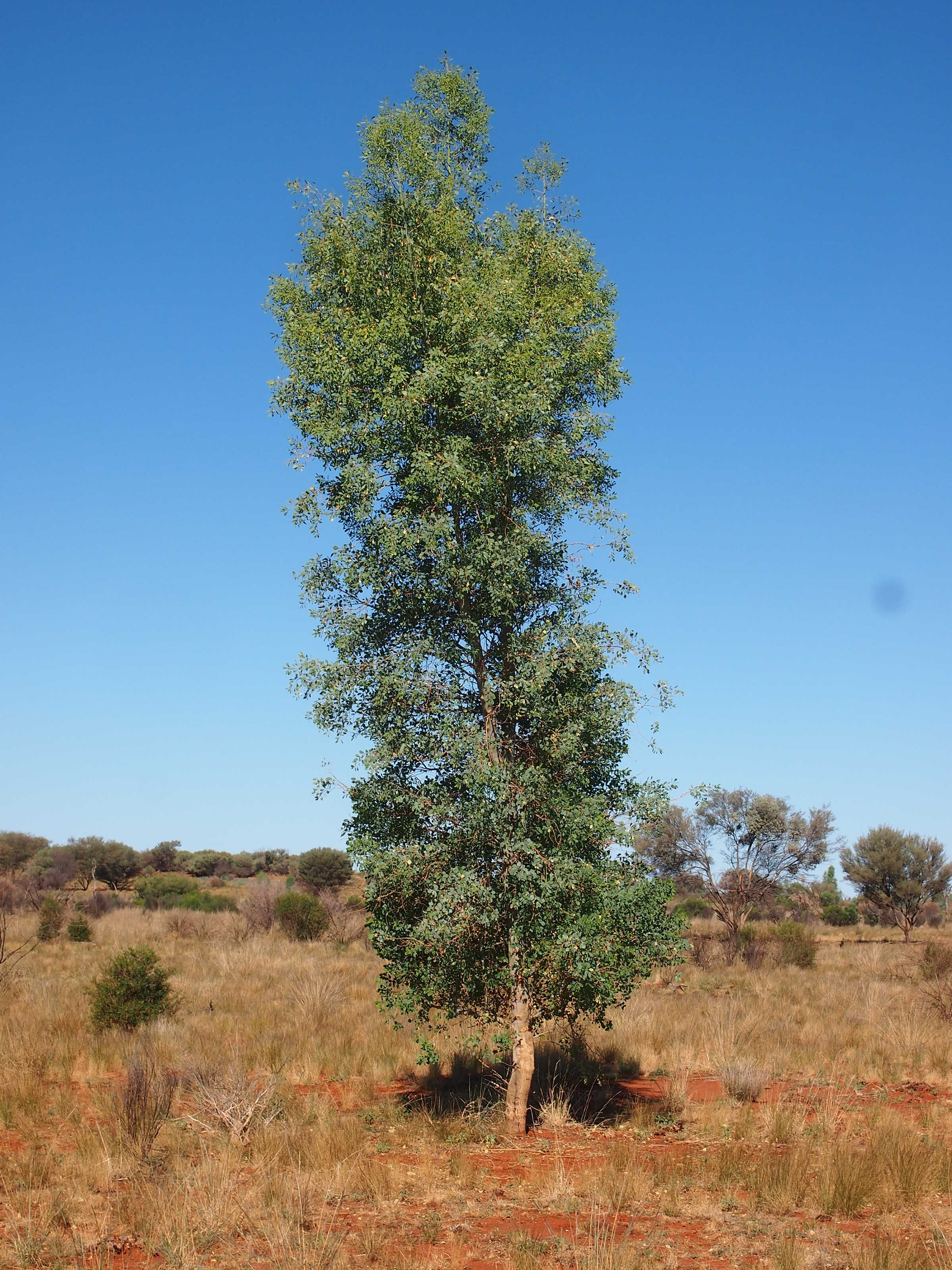
- Codonocarpus cotinifolius

Scientific classification
- Kingdom: Plantae
- Clade: Tracheophytes
- Clade: Angiosperms
- Clade: Eudicots
- Clade: Rosids
- Order: Brassicales
- Family: Gyrostemonaceae
- Genus: Codonocarpus; Endl.

Species
- See text

= Codonocarpus =

Genus of flowering plants

Codonocarpus is a small genus of shrubs or small trees in the family Gyrostemonaceae.

The three species are all endemic to Australia:

- Codonocarpus attenuatus (Hook.) H.Walter - Bell-fruit Tree (New South Wales)
- Codonocarpus cotinifolius (Desf.) F.Muell. - Bell-fruit Tree (Victoria), Native Poplar (New South Wales, South Australia, Western Australia), Desert Poplar (South Australia)
- Codonocarpus pyramidalis (F.Muell.) F.Muell. - Camel Poison (South Australia)
