= Walteranthus =

Scientific classification
- Kingdom: Plantae
- Clade: Tracheophytes
- Clade: Angiosperms
- Clade: Eudicots
- Clade: Rosids
- Order: Brassicales
- Family: Gyrostemonaceae
- Genus: Walteranthus; Keighery
- Species: W. erectus

Binomial name
- Walteranthus erectus Keighery

Species of flowering plant

Walteranthus is a monotypic genus of flowering plants belonging to the family Gyrostemonaceae. It only contains one known species, Walteranthus erectus.

It is native to the state of Western Australia.

== Description ==
They are monoecious, (meaning hermaphroditic, with male and female reproductive structures in separate flowers but on the same plant), short-lived shrubs. The leaves are linear to narrowly elliptic in shape and somewhat succulent. The male flowers are in axillary racemes with the axis not growing out. They have 9-12 stamens, in 1 whorl. The female flowers are solitary, axillary and they are among the upper males and above them. It has 2-5 carpels, united. The stylodia (an elongate stigma that resembles a style) is erect. The fruit (or seed capsule) is a hard indehiscent, slightly rugulose (finely wrinkled) syncarp. The seeds are faintly rugose (wrinkled).

== Taxonomy ==
The genus name of Walteranthus is in honour of Hans Paul Heinrich Walter (b. 1882), a German botanist who worked with Adolf Engler. The Latin specific epithet of erectus means erect or upright. Both the genus and the species were first described and published in Bot. Jahrb. Syst. Vol.106 on pages 108-110 in 1985.

The genus is recognized by the United States Department of Agriculture and the Agricultural Research Service since 1994, but they do not list any known species.
