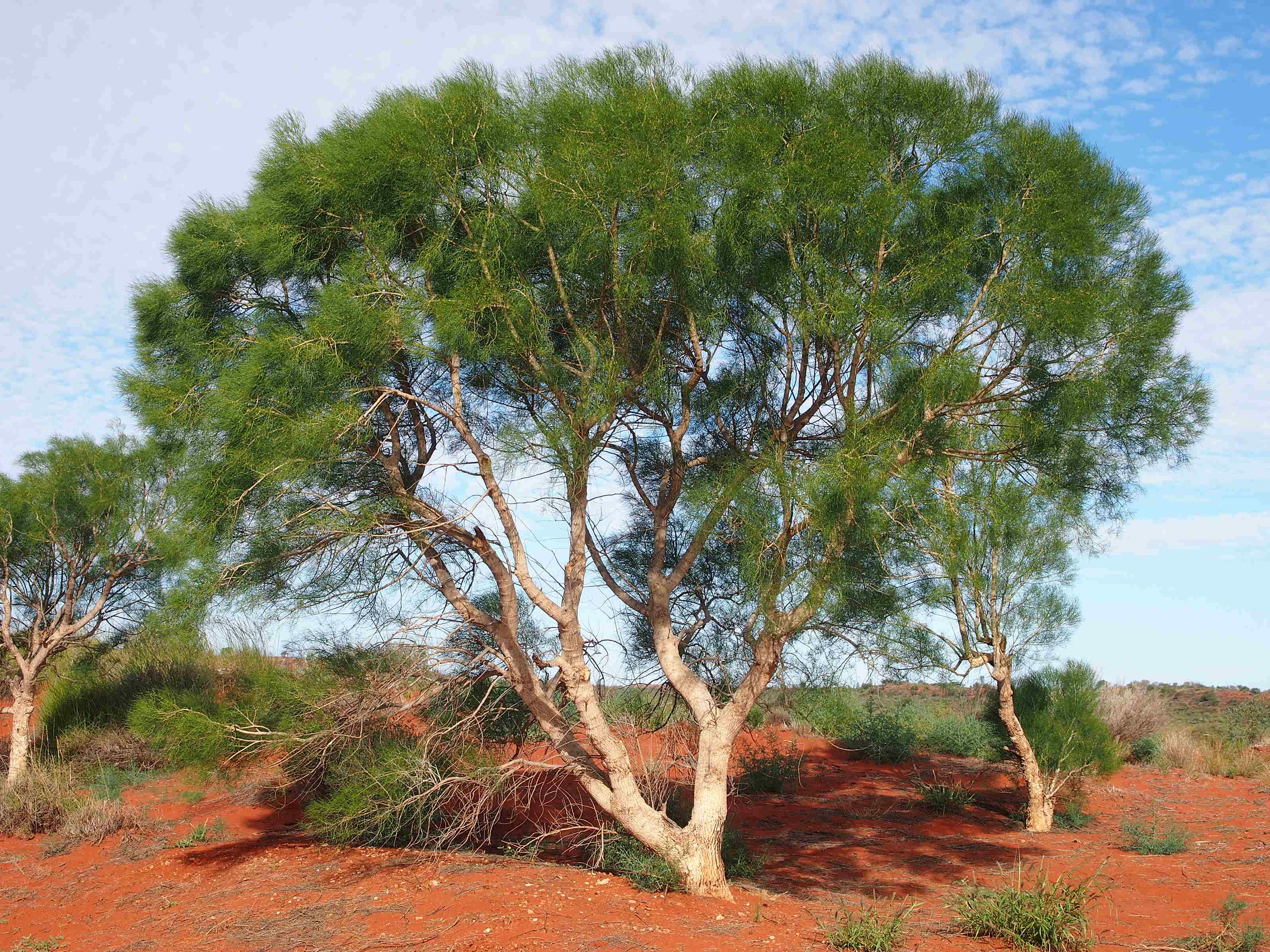
- Gyrostemon ramulosus
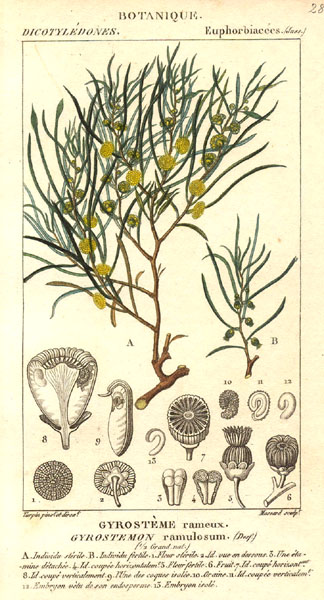
- Gyrostemon ramulosus

Scientific classification
- Kingdom: Plantae
- Clade: Tracheophytes
- Clade: Angiosperms
- Clade: Eudicots
- Clade: Rosids
- Order: Brassicales
- Family: Gyrostemonaceae
- Genus: Gyrostemon; Desf.

Species
- See text

= Gyrostemon =

Genus of flowering plants

Gyrostemon is a genus of shrubs or small trees in the family Gyrostemonaceae, endemic to Australia.

Species include:

- Gyrostemon australasicus (Moq.) Heimerl – Camel Poison
- Gyrostemon brownii S.Moore
- Gyrostemon ditrigynus A.S.George
- Gyrostemon osmus Halford
- Gyrostemon prostratus A.S.George
- Gyrostemon racemiger H.Walter
- Gyrostemon ramulosus Desf. – Corkybark
- Gyrostemon reticulatus A.S.George
- Gyrostemon sessilis A.S.George
- Gyrostemon sheathii W.Fitzg.
- Gyrostemon subnudus (Nees) Baill.
- Gyrostemon tepperi (F.Muell. ex H.Walter) A.S.George
- Gyrostemon thesioides (Hook.f.) A.S.George
