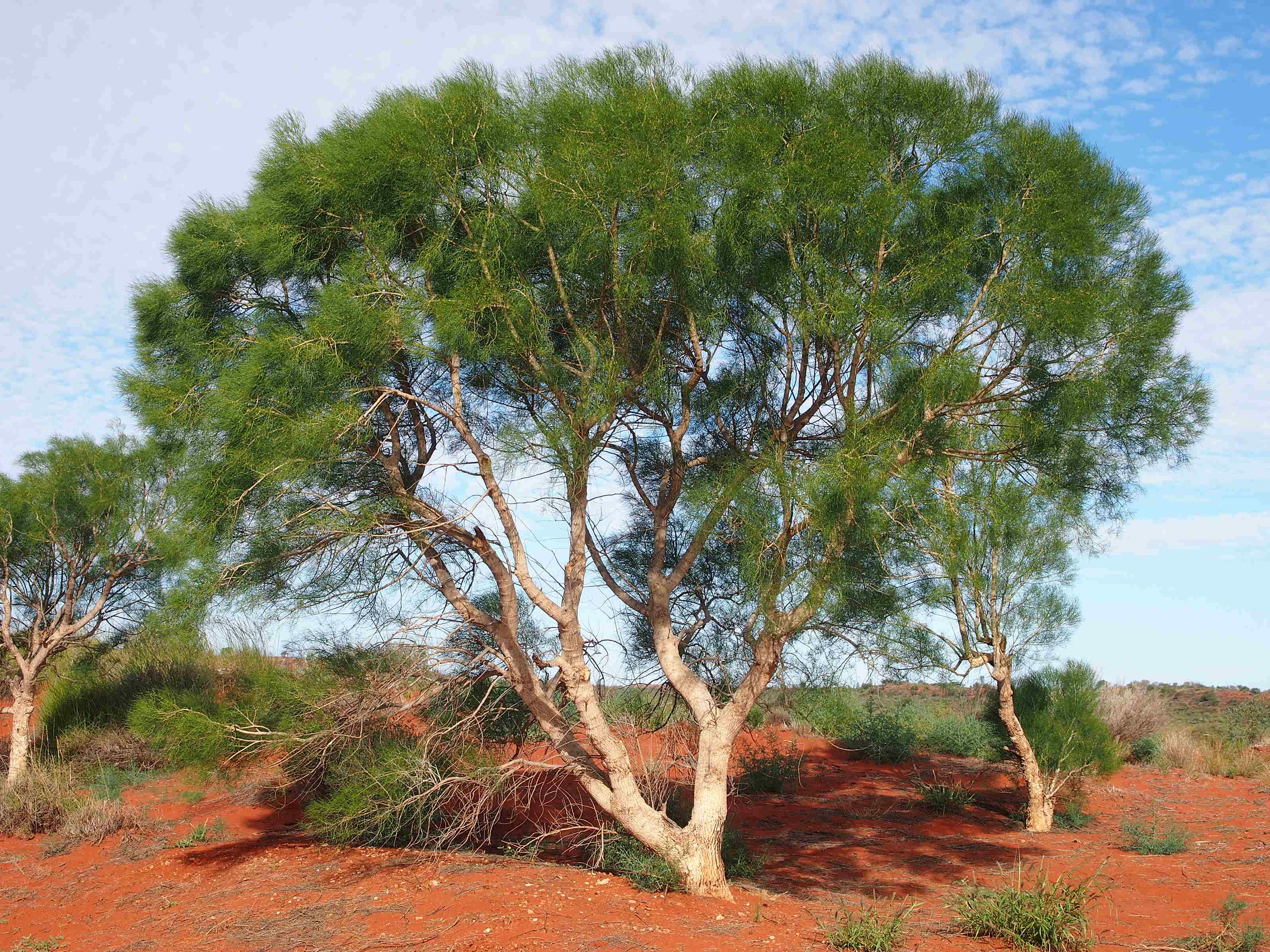

Scientific classification
- Kingdom: Plantae
- Clade: Tracheophytes
- Clade: Angiosperms
- Clade: Eudicots
- Clade: Rosids
- Order: Brassicales
- Family: Gyrostemonaceae
- Genus: Gyrostemon
- Species: G. ramulosus

Binomial name
- Gyrostemon ramulosus Desf.

= Gyrostemon ramulosus =

Species of plant

Gyrostemon ramulosus is a plant in the family Gyrostemonaceae. It was first described by René Louiche Desfontaines in 1820.

It is native to dry zones in Western and South of Australia.

== Description ==
Gyrostemon ramulosus grows to shrubs or trees to 5 m (16 ft) tall, with corky bark on the old branches; the leaves are slender. Male flowers have pedicels that curve backwards, reaching up to 5 mm (0.20 in) in length and width when fully open, featuring a distinctly lobed calyx with pointed lobes and multiple anthers arranged in several layers.

Female flowers also possess backward-curving pedicels, reaching lengths of up to 7 mm (0.28 in), with a distinctly lobed calyx where the lobes are either pointed or blunt. Each female flower typically contains 20-30 carpels, each with a stalkless stigma that spreads to form a crown above the ring of ovaries. These flowers bloom between May and September. The pale brown spherical fruits, measuring up to 6 mm (0.24 in) in length, develop from multiple seed segments.
