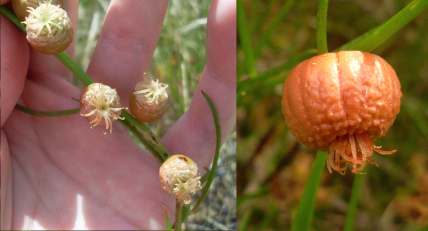
- Fruit of Tersonia cyathiflora

Scientific classification
- Kingdom: Plantae
- Clade: Tracheophytes
- Clade: Angiosperms
- Clade: Eudicots
- Clade: Rosids
- Order: Brassicales
- Family: Gyrostemonaceae
- Genus: Tersonia; Moq.

= Tersonia =

Genus of flowering plants

Tersonia is a genus of flowering plants in the family Gyrostemonaceae.

It is endemic to Western Australia.

== Known species ==
- Tersonia cyathiflora (Fenzl) A.S.George ex J.W.Green, also known as button creeper.
- Tersonia brevipes Moq., published in 1849,

They all have a syncarps.

== Taxonomy ==
The genus name of Tersonia is in honour of Joséphine Louise Moquin-Tandon, born de Terson (1819–1890), wife of the French botanist Alfred Moquin-Tandon (Moq), the author of this genus. It was first described and published in Prodr. Vol.13 (Issue 2) on page 40 in 1849.
