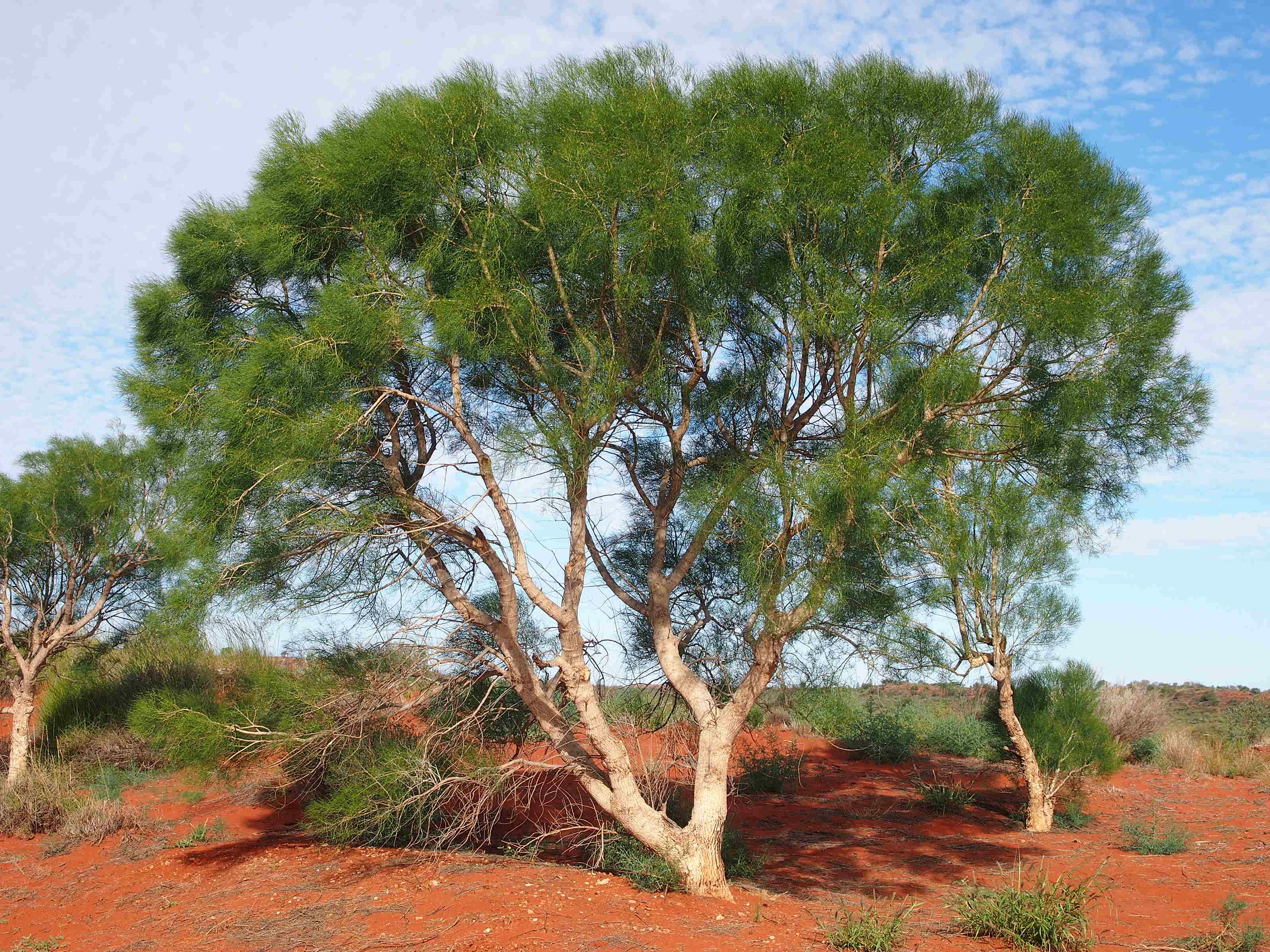
- Gyrostemon ramulosus

Scientific classification
- Kingdom: Plantae
- Clade: Tracheophytes
- Clade: Angiosperms
- Clade: Eudicots
- Clade: Rosids
- Order: Brassicales
- Family: Gyrostemonaceae; A.Juss.

Genera
- Codonocarpus; Cypselocarpus; Didymotheca; Gyrostemon; Tersonia; Walteranthus

= Gyrostemonaceae =

Family of flowering plants

Gyrostemonaceae is a family of plants in the order Brassicales. It comprises 4(-6) genera, totalling about 20 known species. All are endemic to temperate parts of Australia. They are shrubs or small trees with small, often narrow leaves, and small flowers. They are wind-pollinated.

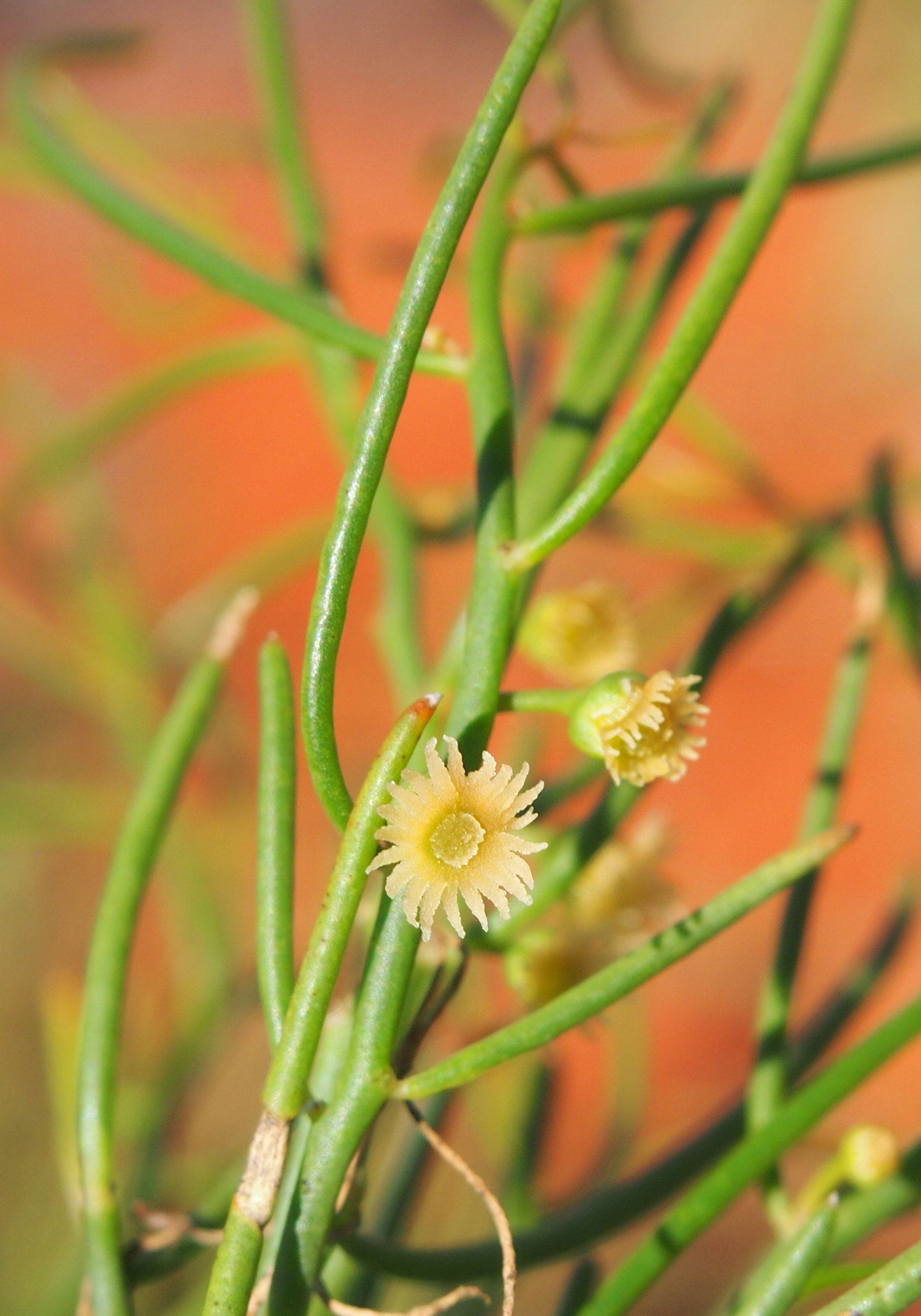
Gyrostemon ramulosis flowers.jpg
