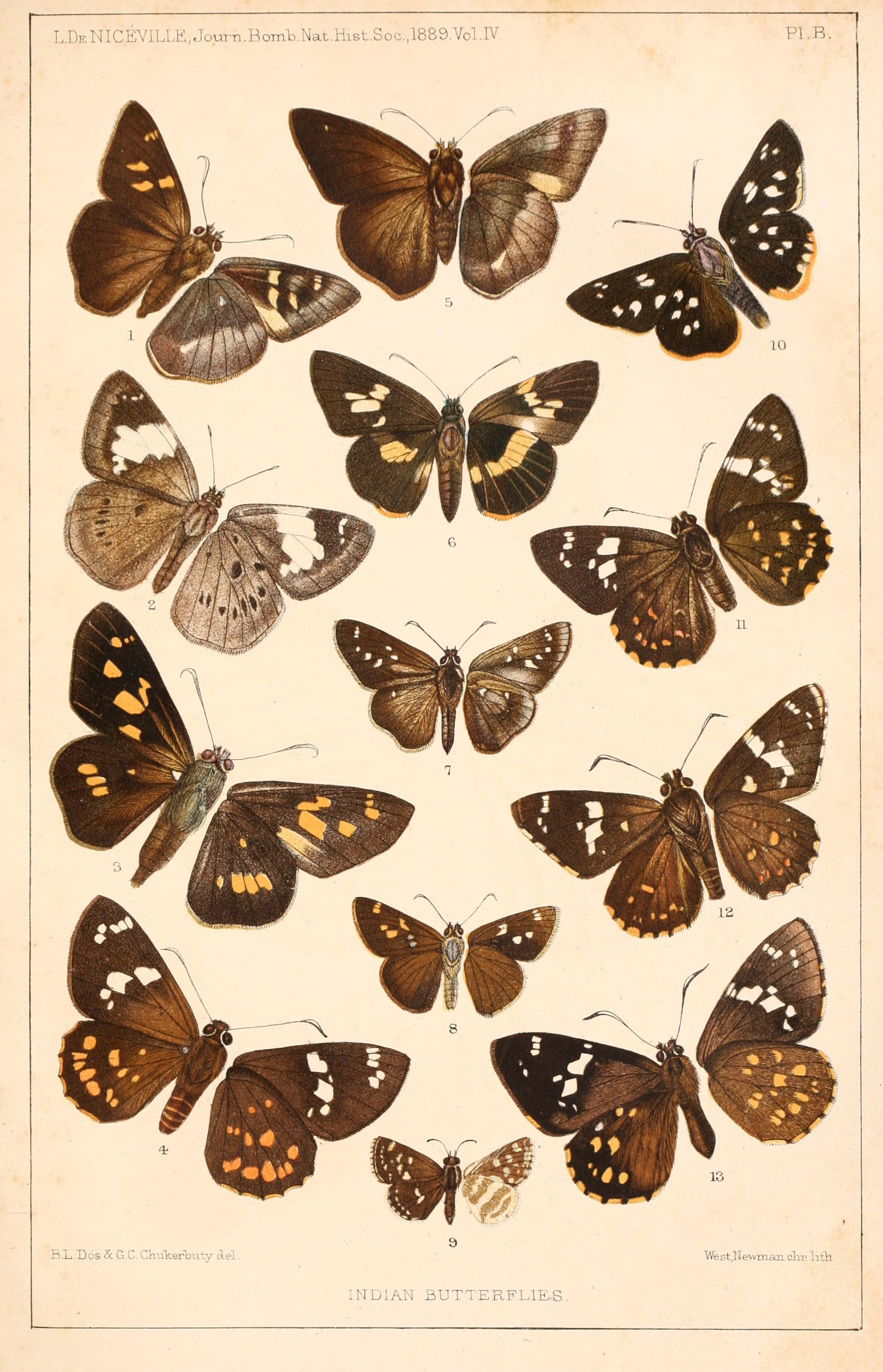
- Spialia zebra zebra (Butler, 1888) as Hesperia hellas in de Niceville (fig.9)

Scientific classification
- Kingdom: Animalia
- Phylum: Arthropoda
- Class: Insecta
- Order: Lepidoptera
- Family: Hesperiidae
- Genus: Spialia
- Species: S. zebra

Binomial name
- Spialia zebra (Butler, 1888)

Synonyms
- Pyrgus zebra Butler, 1888; Hesperia hellas de Nicéville, 1889; Hesperia bifida Higgins, 1924

= Spialia zebra =

Species of butterfly

Spialia zebra, the zebra grizzled skipper, is a butterfly in the family Hesperiidae. It is found in Pakistan, India, Yemen, Oman, Ethiopia, southern Sudan, Uganda, Kenya and north-western Tanzania.

The larvae feed on Melhania (including Melhania ovata and Melhania velutina) and Dombeya species.

== Subspecies ==
- Spialia zebra zebra (Pakistan, India: Punjab)
- Spialia zebra bifida (Higgins, 1924) (Yemen, Oman, Ethiopia, southern Sudan, Uganda, Kenya, northern Tanzania)
