= Zeitzer Land =

District in southern Saxony-Anhalt

Coordinates: 51.050°N 12.133°E

Zeitzer Land was a Verwaltungsgemeinschaft ("collective municipality") in the Burgenlandkreis (district), in Saxony-Anhalt, Germany. The seat of the Verwaltungsgemeinschaft was in Zeitz. Before it was disbanded on 1 January 2010, the Verwaltungsgemeinschaft Zeitzer Land consisted of three municipalities: Luckenau, Theißen, and Zeitz.
