= Melhania dehnhardtii =

Scientific classification
- Kingdom: Plantae
- Clade: Tracheophytes
- Clade: Angiosperms
- Clade: Eudicots
- Clade: Rosids
- Order: Malvales
- Family: Malvaceae
- Genus: Melhania
- Species: M. dehnhardtii

Binomial name
- Melhania dehnhardtii K.Schum.

Species of plant

Melhania dehnhardtii is a plant in the family Malvaceae. It is named for the German explorers Clemens and Gustav Denhardt.

== Description ==
Melhania dehnhardtii grows as a suffrutex (subshrub) up to 1 metre (3 ft) tall. The elliptic to ovate leaves are tomentose and measure up to 3 cm (1 in) long. Inflorescences are solitary or two or three-flowered, on a stalk measuring up to 2.5 cm (1 in) long. The flowers have bright yellow petals.

== Distribution and habitat ==
Melhania dehnhardtii is endemic to Kenya's Kilifi District where it is known from fewer than five sites. Its habitat is in Acacia-Commiphora bushland to elevations of about 250 m (800 ft).
