= Melhania didyma =

Scientific classification
- Kingdom: Plantae
- Clade: Tracheophytes
- Clade: Angiosperms
- Clade: Eudicots
- Clade: Rosids
- Order: Malvales
- Family: Malvaceae
- Genus: Melhania
- Species: M. didyma

Binomial name
- Melhania didyma Eckl. & Zeyh.

Synonyms
- Melhania macrophylla (Vis.) Vis.; Vialia macrophylla Vis.

Species of flowering plant

Melhania didyma is a plant in the mallow family Malvaceae, native to southern Africa.

== Description ==
Melhania didyma grows as a low bushy shrub 20–60 centimetres (8–24 in) tall, sometimes to 1 m (3 ft) tall. It branches from near the base, with a woody main stem. The leaves are pubescent above, tomentose below and measure up to 10 cm (4 in) long. Inflorescences measuring up to 5 cm (2 in) long are typically two-flowered and feature yellow petals. The species resembles Melhania forbesii in the bracts of the epicalyx, but differs in upper leaf surface.

== Distribution and habitat ==
Melhania didyma is native to Botswana, South Africa (Cape Provinces, KwaZulu-Natal, Northern Provinces) and Eswatini. Its habitat includes thornveld, grassy slopes or forest margins. The species is often found by rivers.
