= Melhania integra =

Scientific classification
- Kingdom: Plantae
- Clade: Tracheophytes
- Clade: Angiosperms
- Clade: Eudicots
- Clade: Rosids
- Order: Malvales
- Family: Malvaceae
- Genus: Melhania
- Species: M. integra

Binomial name
- Melhania integra I.Verd.

Species of flowering plant

Melhania integra is a plant in the mallow family Malvaceae, native to South Africa.

== Description ==
Melhania integra grows as a shrub 20–45 centimetres (8–18 in) tall, with several woody stems. The tomentose leaves measure up to 6.5 cm (3 in) long. Inflorescences are typically one to three-flowered and feature yellow petals. The species resembles Melhania randii but differs, for example, in its larger flowers.

== Distribution and habitat ==
Melhania integra is native to South Africa's Northern Provinces. Its habitat is among rocks on grassy slopes.
