= Denhardt =

Denhardt is a surname. Notable people with the surname include:

- Clemens Denhardt (1852–1928), German explorer
- Gustav Denhardt (1856–1917), German explorer
- Henry Denhardt (1876–1937), American politician and retired brigadier general
- Robert Denhardt (born 1942), American scholar and author

== See also ==
- Dennhardt
