= Dobris =

Dobris may refer to

- Dobříš, a town in the Czech Republic
- Döbris, a village and a former municipality in Germany
- Joel Dobris (born c. 1940), American lawyer
