= Melhania burchellii =

Scientific classification
- Kingdom: Plantae
- Clade: Tracheophytes
- Clade: Angiosperms
- Clade: Eudicots
- Clade: Rosids
- Order: Malvales
- Family: Malvaceae
- Genus: Melhania
- Species: M. burchellii

Binomial name
- Melhania burchellii DC.

Synonyms
- Melhania albicans Baker f.; Melhania dinteri Engl.; Melhania serrata Schinz

Species of flowering plant

Melhania burchellii is a plant in the family Malvaceae, native to southern Africa. It is named for the English explorer and naturalist William John Burchell.

== Description ==
Melhania burchellii grows as a shrub up to 90 centimetres (35 in) tall, with many branches. The leaves are stellate tomentose and measure up to 10 cm (4 in) long. Inflorescences are usually two to many-flowered, featuring yellow petals.

== Distribution and habitat ==
Melhania burchellii is native to Botswana, Namibia, South Africa (Cape Provinces, Free State, Northern Provinces) and Zimbabwe. Its habitat is in dry areas.
