= Cyperus elephantinus =

Scientific classification
- Kingdom: Plantae
- Clade: Tracheophytes
- Clade: Angiosperms
- Clade: Monocots
- Clade: Commelinids
- Order: Poales
- Family: Cyperaceae
- Genus: Cyperus
- Species: C. elephantinus

Binomial name
- Cyperus elephantinus (C.B.Clarke) C.B.Clarke, 1909

Species of sedge

Cyperus elephantinus is a species of sedge that is native to KwaZulu-Natal and the Northern Provinces of South Africa.

== See also ==
- List of Cyperus species
