= Melhania milleri =

Conservation status
- Data Deficient (IUCN 3.1)

Scientific classification
- Kingdom: Plantae
- Clade: Tracheophytes
- Clade: Angiosperms
- Clade: Eudicots
- Clade: Rosids
- Order: Malvales
- Family: Malvaceae
- Genus: Melhania
- Species: M. milleri

Binomial name
- Melhania milleri Abedin

Species of flowering plant

Melhania milleri is listed in the 2004 IUCN Red List as a species of flowering plant in the family Malvaceae, endemic to Socotra, with its natural habitats being subtropical or tropical dry forests and subtropical or tropical dry shrubland. As of March 2023, the species was not listed by the International Plant Names Index, nor by other taxonomic databases such as Plants of the World Online.
