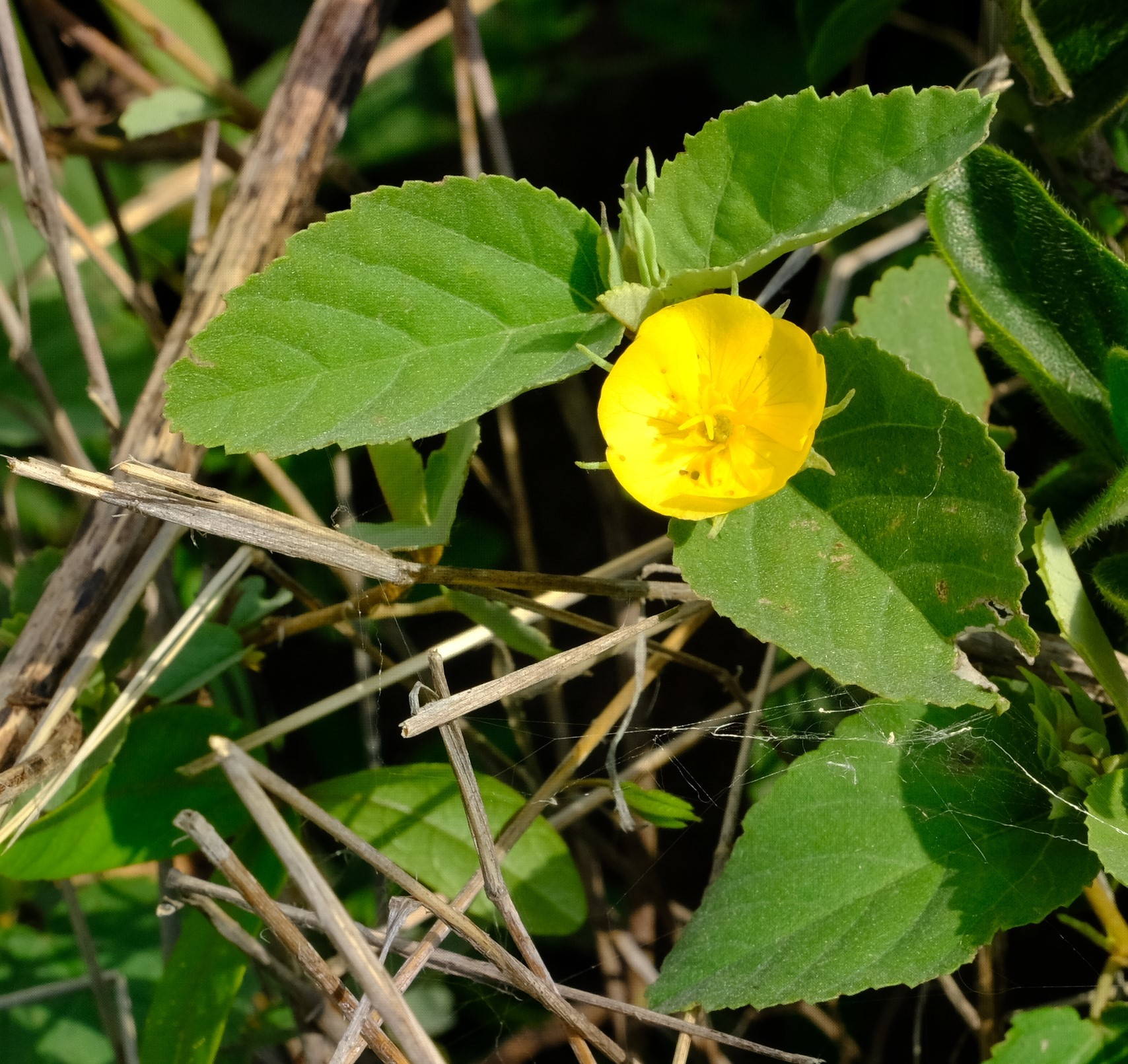
- Near Louwsburg, South Africa

Scientific classification
- Kingdom: Plantae
- Clade: Tracheophytes
- Clade: Angiosperms
- Clade: Eudicots
- Clade: Rosids
- Order: Malvales
- Family: Malvaceae
- Genus: Melhania
- Species: M. suluensis

Binomial name
- Melhania suluensis Gerstner

= Melhania suluensis =

Species of flowering plant

Melhania suluensis is a plant in the family Malvaceae, native to southern Africa.

== Description ==
Melhania suluensis grows as a suffrutex (subshrub) 60–90 centimetres (24–35 in) tall, with many branches. The leaves measure up to 4.5 cm (2 in) long and are thinly stellate tomentose. The lower leaf surface is silvery-grey, the upper is darker. Inflorescences are one or two-flowered, on a stalk measuring up to 2 cm (1 in) long. The flowers have yellow petals.

== Distribution and habitat ==
Melhania suluensis is native to South Africa (KwaZulu-Natal, Northern Provinces) and Eswatini. Its habitat is in alluvial soils or on bushveld slopes, to altitudes of about 170 m (560 ft).
