= Melhania transvaalensis =

Scientific classification
- Kingdom: Plantae
- Clade: Tracheophytes
- Clade: Angiosperms
- Clade: Eudicots
- Clade: Rosids
- Order: Malvales
- Family: Malvaceae
- Genus: Melhania
- Species: M. transvaalensis

Binomial name
- Melhania transvaalensis Szyszył.

Species of flowering plant

Melhania transvaalensis is a plant in the family Malvaceae, native to South Africa.

== Description ==
Melhania transvaalensis grows as a shrub 14–60 centimetres (6–24 in) tall, with several stems. The oblong leaves measure up to 9 cm (4 in) long and are coarsely pubescent on the upper side, tomentose on the under side. Inflorescences are typically single-flowered, on a stalk measuring up to 2.5 cm (1 in) long, featuring yellow petals.

== Distribution and habitat ==
Melhania transvaalensis is confined to South Africa's Northern Provinces. Its habitat is stony hills and grassy slopes.
