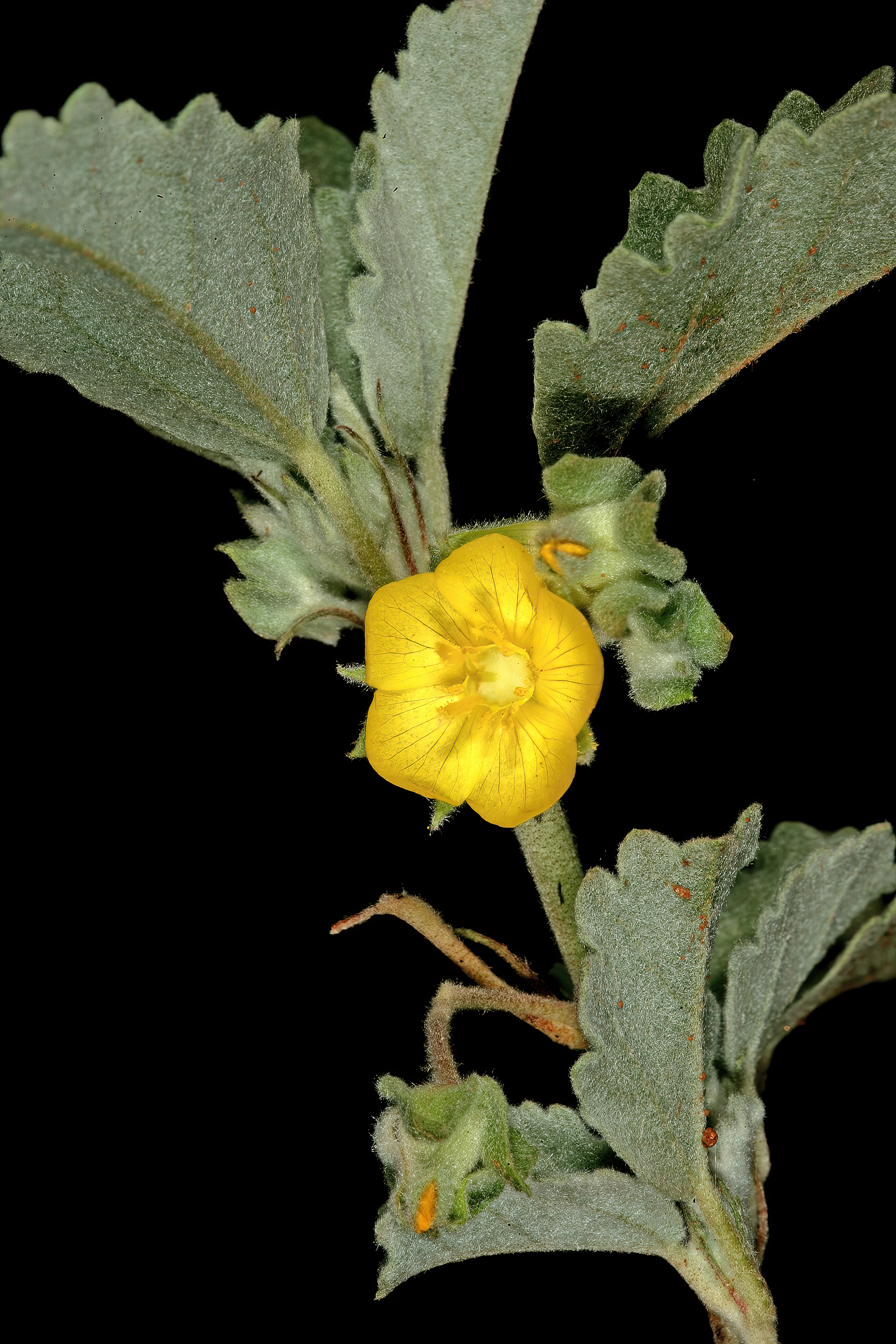
- In Limpopo, South Africa

Scientific classification
- Kingdom: Plantae
- Clade: Tracheophytes
- Clade: Angiosperms
- Clade: Eudicots
- Clade: Rosids
- Order: Malvales
- Family: Malvaceae
- Genus: Melhania
- Species: M. rehmannii

Binomial name
- Melhania rehmannii Szyszył.

Synonyms
- Melhania griquensis Bolus

= Melhania rehmannii =

Species of flowering plant

Melhania rehmannii is a plant in the family Malvaceae, native to southern Africa. It is named for the Polish botanist and geographer Anton Rehmann.

== Description ==
Melhania rehmannii grows as a small shrub up to 30 centimetres (12 in) tall, with many stems. The leaves are stellate tomentose and measure up to 4 cm (2 in) long. Inflorescences have solitary flowers. The flowers feature yellow petals.

== Distribution and habitat ==
Melhania rehmannii is native to Botswana, Mozambique, Namibia, South Africa (Cape Provinces, Free State, Northern Provinces), Eswatini and Zimbabwe. Its habitat is dry areas including bushveld, sandy flats or rocky ridges.
