= Karl Walther =

German painter

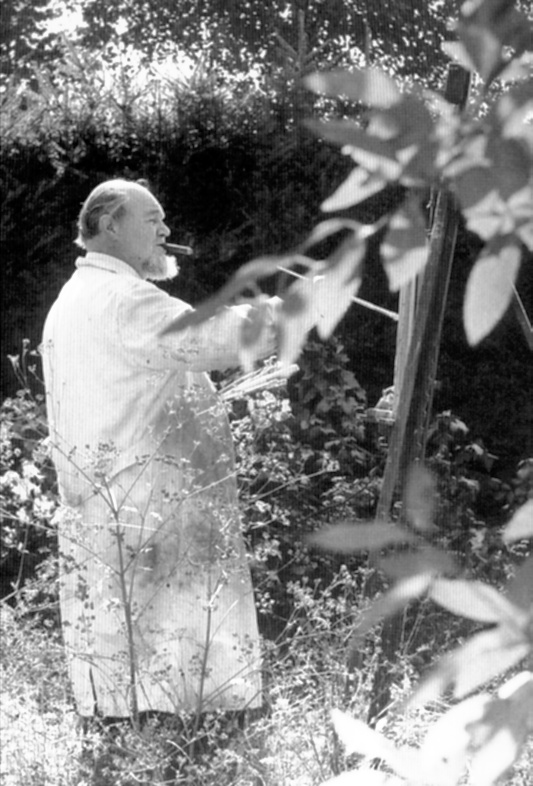
Karl Walther in his garden in Seeshaupt (1968)

Karl Walther (August 19, 1905 in Zeitz – June 9, 1981 in Seeshaupt) was a painter of the German Post-Impressionist school, and an exponent of plein air painting. His works include portraits, still lifes, cityscapes and landscape paintings.

== Life ==
=== Career and first exhibitions ===
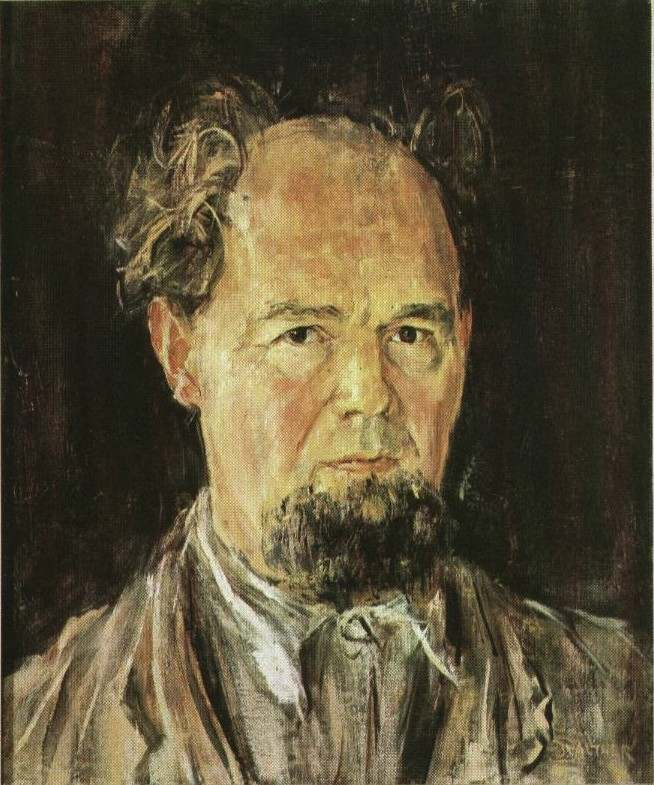
Self-portrait with beard (1947)

Following a lithography apprenticeship, Walther studied music (1920) and then painting (1925) at the Academy of Visual Arts Leipzig with Heinz Dörffel and Fritz Ernst Rentsch. In Leutzsch, the western suburb of Leipzig, Walther had his first studio. In 1929, Walther moved to Berlin. By means of Max Liebermann and Ulrich Hübner, he was accepted as a master student of Max Slevogt in 1932, who, however, died shortly before his arrival. Walther had his first solo exhibition in September 1926 at the gallery of Heinrich Barchfeld in Leipzig, followed by an exhibition at the gallery of Victor Hartberg in Berlin in the same year. The exhibition in Berlin was followed by international exhibitions at the Carnegie Institute of the Carnegie Museum of Art in Pittsburgh in 1935, the Berlin Secession in 1928, and the Venice Biennale in 1938. Painting stays abroad led him to the Lake Lugano in 1930, to Paris in 1931, where he met Oskar Kokoschka, and to the Rembrandt-Exhibition in Amsterdam in 1932. In 1933, Walther traveled for three months in Florence and Tuscany. In 1935, Walther married Gnade-Maria Knote, the daughter of a pastor and librarian.

=== Before 1945 ===
Beside numerous solo exhibitions, Walther regularly took part in the Great German Art Exhibition in the Haus der Kunst in Munich. Until 1944, he exhibited a total of 29 images, of which 13 were sold. Despite his participation in this exhibition, which was propagated as the most important cultural event in Nazi Germany, Walther cannot be attributed to the Art of the Third Reich as his works were never based on the Nazi art conception and its related heroic realism. Walther's art of that era was often inspired by a tristesse which reflected the reality of his objects in an impressionistic manner, but without any political coloration. Walther greatly admired and was influenced by Lovis Corinth, whose works were denounced as Degenerate Art by the Nazis.

His talent in picturing the mood of cities and his success during the Great German Art Exhibition preserved Walther for a long time from conscription to the Wehrmacht: until mid-1944, after the completion of a number of paintings of Würzburg at the invitation of Prof. Heinrich Dikreiter (Founder of the Municipal Gallery of Würzburg), Walther was exempted from military service.

In 1940, Walther moved from Leipzig to Munich, and in 1943 to Seeshaupt on Lake Starnberg (in 1942 he had to give up his studio in Berlin because of bomb attacks). On September 1, 1944, Walther was called up to military service and deployed in Northern Italy. There he fell into British captivity, where he became friends with the Würzburg painter and graphic artist Josef Scheuplein in the POW camp of Rimini.

=== The post-war years ===
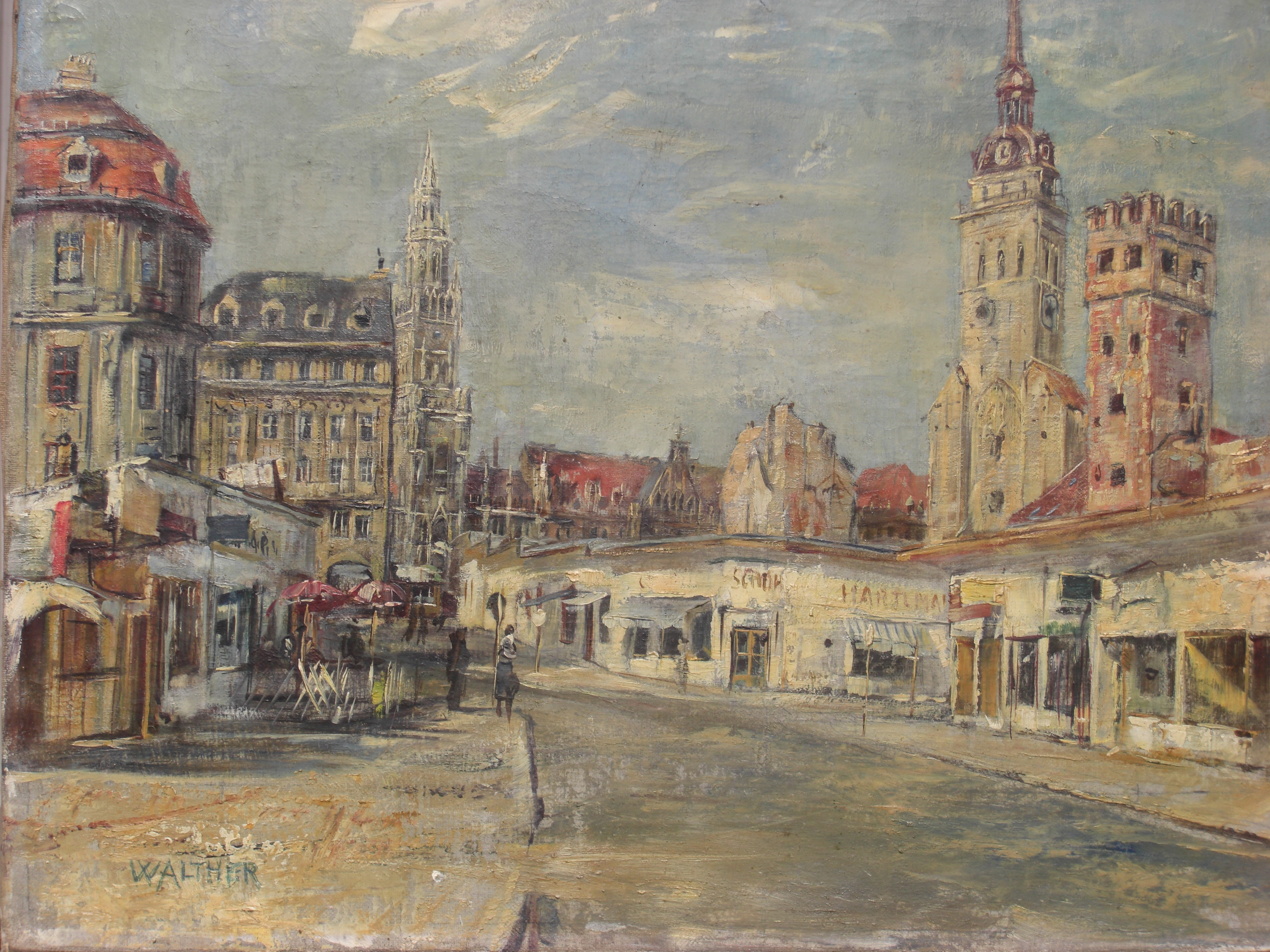
Peter Church and Lion Tower in Munich (1950)

After World War II, Walther created many pictures of the destroyed city of Munich. At the end of May 1946 and again in 1947, Walther returned to Würzburg. In the summer of 1947, his paintings were exhibited at the Würzburg city hall. On this occasion, the artist painted more images documenting the destroyed town. In 1950, Walther again participated in the International Carnegie Exhibition in Pittsburgh. With the expansion of his property in Seeshaupt, Walther worked almost exclusively on contract works. During this time, he painted several portraits of American military personnel and diplomats, including the Consul General in Munich, Sam E. Woods. In 1960, Walther painted for two months at Lake Garda and in the South Tyrol. In 1962, he traveled to the memorial exhibition to mark the 300th birthday of Frans Hals in Haarlem, Netherlands. In May 1964, Walther's father Karl Friedrich Walther (who was living in Leipzig) died, followed in February 1968 by his mother Bertha. From 1968 on, Walther painted again in the South Tyrol, in Brixen and Merano among others, and from 1970 on in Salorno and the Seiser Alm.

Together with Berlin painter friends, Walther travelled again to Venice in 1974, where he created a number of bright and vivid city images, and in 1976 to Berlin-Spandau. Karl Walther was a long-time member and vice-president of the Munich Artists' Association and participated in their annual exhibitions. From 1974 to 1976, Walther visited his hometown Leipzig and painted particular views of the Leipzig Brühl. In 1976, he created his last paintings in Berlin.

In the spring of 1978, Walther suffered a stroke which forced him to give up painting, and he devoted his attention to music in his last years.

== Artistic influence ==
Walther's painting is influenced by French and German impressionists and his enthusiasm for Liebermann, Corinth and Slevogt, as well as for their predecessors, Velázquez and Constable. Early in his career, he studied works by German impressionists in the Leipzig Museum of Fine Arts, being significantly influenced by works by Slevogt, Corinth and Liebermann, Leistikow, Leibl, Hagemeister and Schuch. Walther also got important suggestions from Menzel, Courbet and the Leibl Circle. In 1974, Walther recalled the impact that Lovis Corinth's book Das Erlenen der Malerei ("On Learning to Paint", published in 1908) had for him: "I got to know this book," he wrote, "as early as 1922, when I finally made up my mind [...] to devote myself entirely to the pictorial representation of reality. Since I first ever took any lessons at an academy or private school, Corinth was my only textbook instructions for self-study of human, animal, landscape and architectural painting".

== Works ==
=== Portraits ===
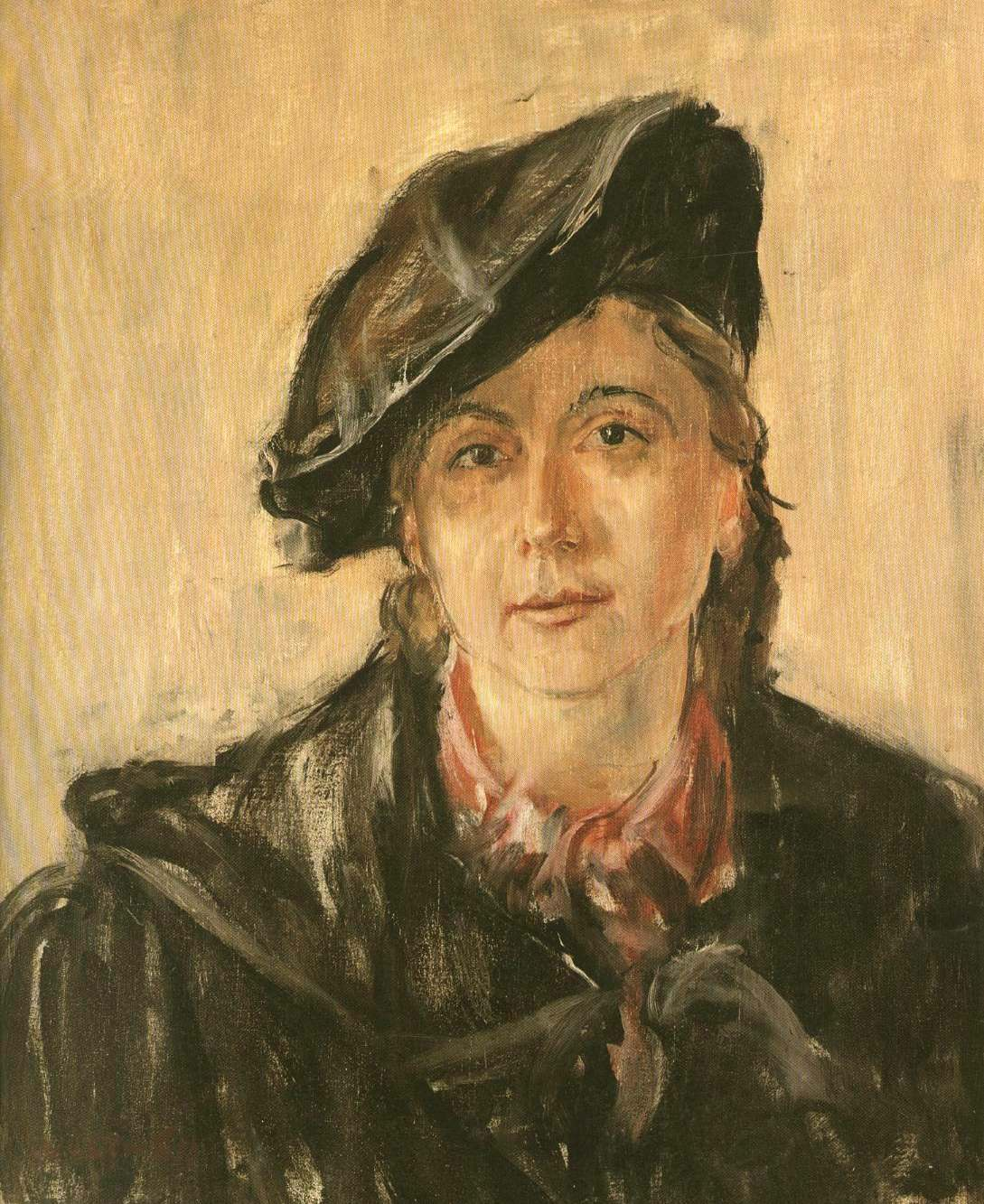
Lady with black beret (1947)

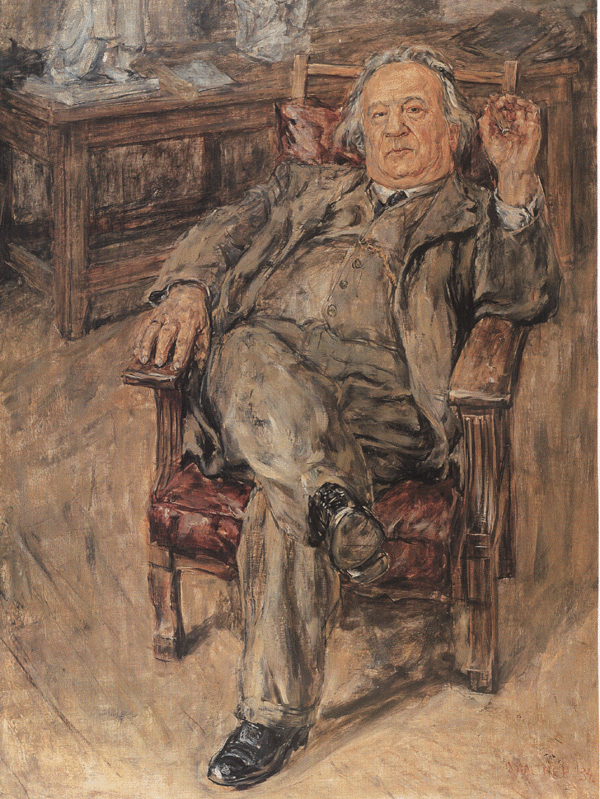
Sculptor Prof. Hartmann (1934)

As his role models, Walther has dealt with its own physiognomy. From the early days of his work there are bold self-portraits, showing him at ease, secure and unwavering. It's the rough, unpolished and at the same time highly sensitive man of simple circles, as he appears in the memories of witnesses. In the later works he can be seen as an artistic personality, checking himself, but with the consciousness of mastery, waiving classic attributes such as brush and palette. In his portraits, Walther has repeatedly groped himself with preparatory pencil drawings to the characteristics of his counterpart.

With gentle, always crashing strokes, the artist captures the shape and gets more energetic and dense when it comes to determining the brightness and darkness. When being implemented to the canvas, the drawing composition is maintained and the color is added. Rarely, there are "talking" attributes such as the portrait of a physician posing in his white overalls. Usually, the characteristic features of the painted are already sufficient, standing or sitting, resting in themselves at ease or confident, or with an appropriate rhetorical gesture. Among the personalities portrayed by Walther there are e.g. the opera singer Fanny Cleve and the mountaineer Luis Trenker.

=== Still lifes ===
In his still lifes, Walther focuses on the exact observation, detecting everyday situations which seem to be banal only at first glance. Walther can wrest these things a picturesque charm, he can raise profane objects to works of art without putting them on a symbolic level. He painted old shoes such as Vincent van Gogh; however, such images are no social impeachment. The still lifes of Édouard Manet which Walther had seen in Berlin, impress with the unspectacular. Walther was, as the Frenchman, deliberately undemanding in the choice of his sujets: His garden gave the flowers of spring, summer and autumn, as well as fruits and vegetables. A rabbit or pheasant, or a bright red lobster were portrayed to seem like they just came into the house. The composition of colors is the essence of Walther, it dominates the material of the subject.

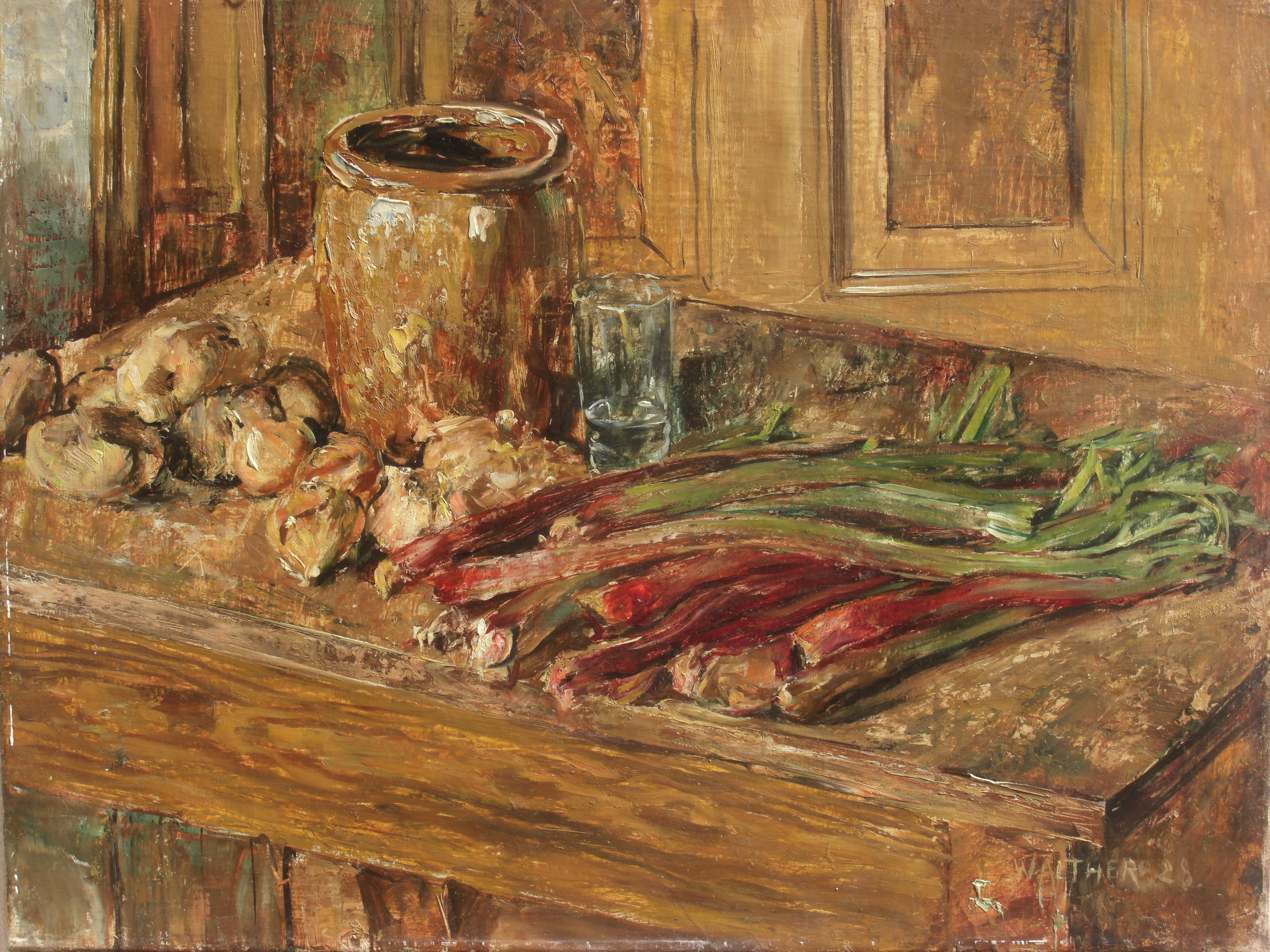
Still life with cuisine vegetables (1928)

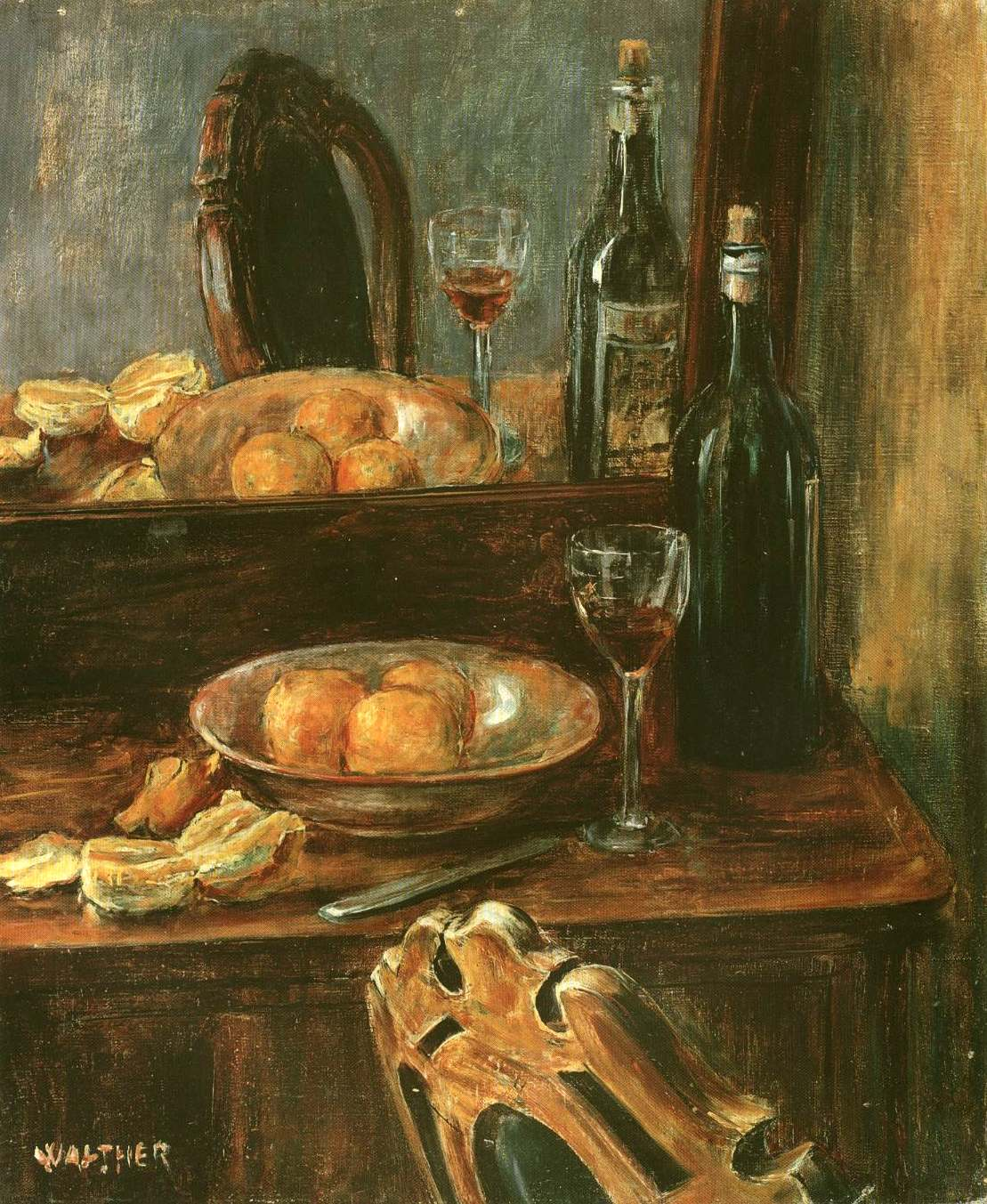
Still life with mirror (1932)

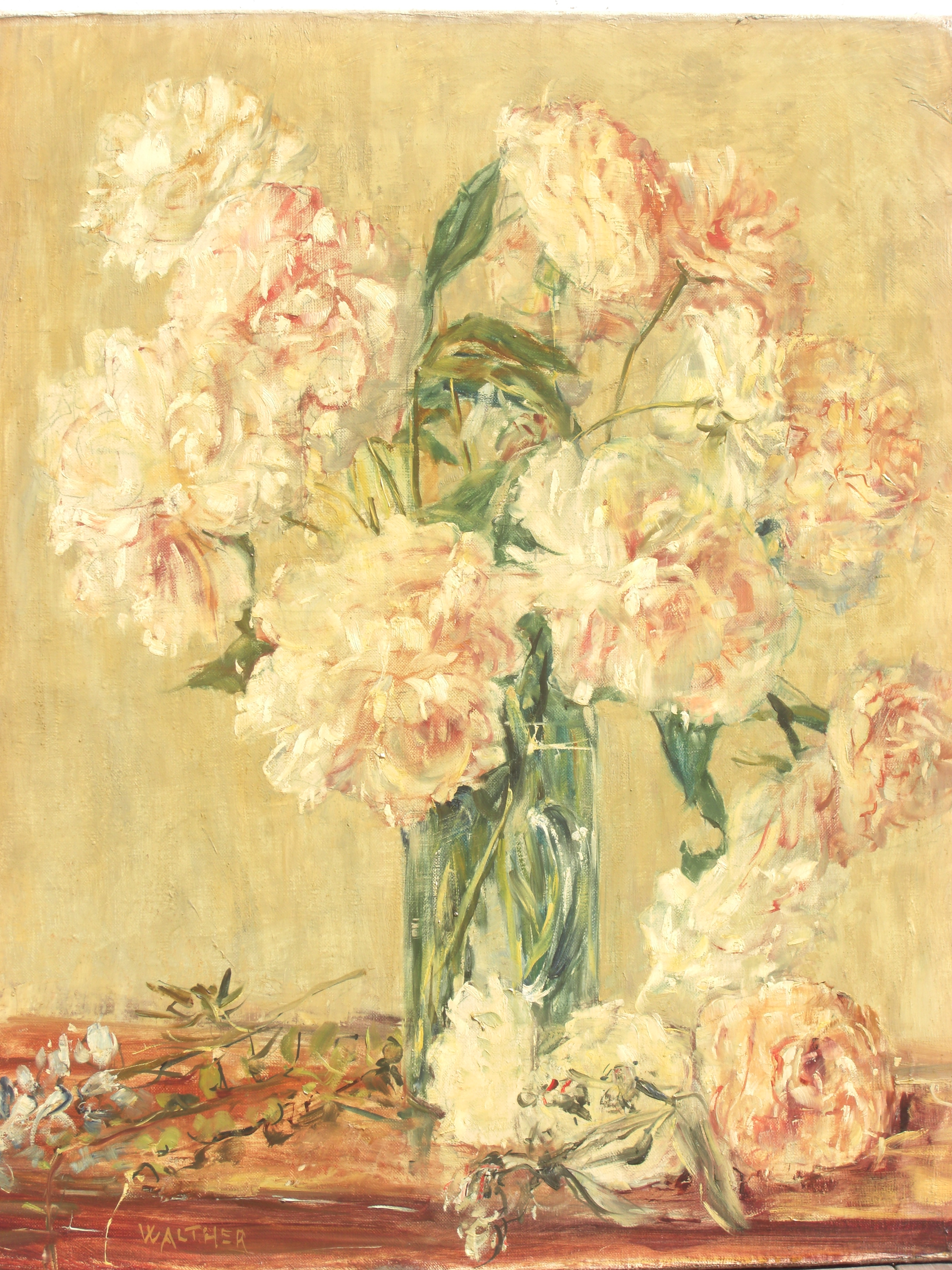
Still life with peonies (1967)

=== Cityscapes ===
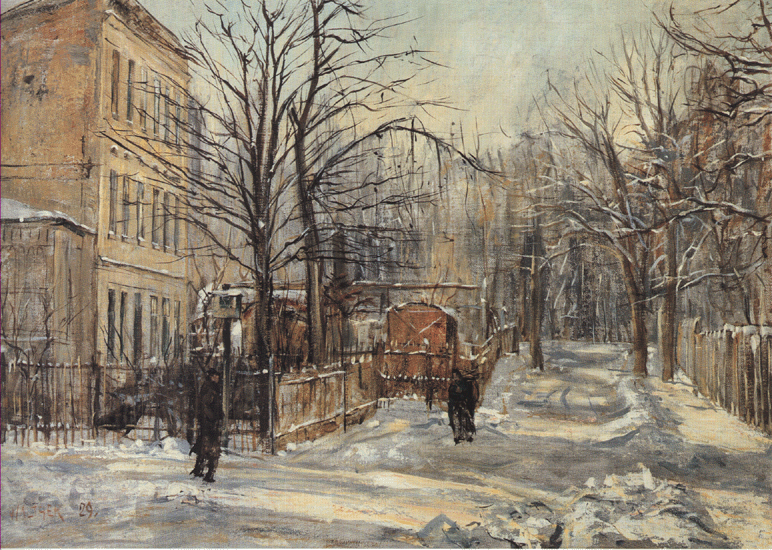
Winter in the suburbs (1929)

Architectural images and cityscapes comprise the largest share of Walther's painting. Many of the works created before the destructions of World War II became documents of German urbanism. With just a few strokes Walther could capture the urban situation, he could estimate the ratios of architectures to each other and fix the different dimensions. The artist returned to the location two or three times in order to continue his painting in the same light. Unlike many of his predecessors, Walther did not paint in an idealized or timeless manner: he was committed to reality, as some wintry cloudy city views or images of destroyed Munich show. Reality did not mean for him to paint everything exactly to the last detail. One searches in vain for clearly decipherable inscriptions, iconographically identifiable figures or nameable passers. Walther does not put the topographical accuracy into the middle, but the overall impressionistic expression of his cityscapes.

=== Landscapes ===
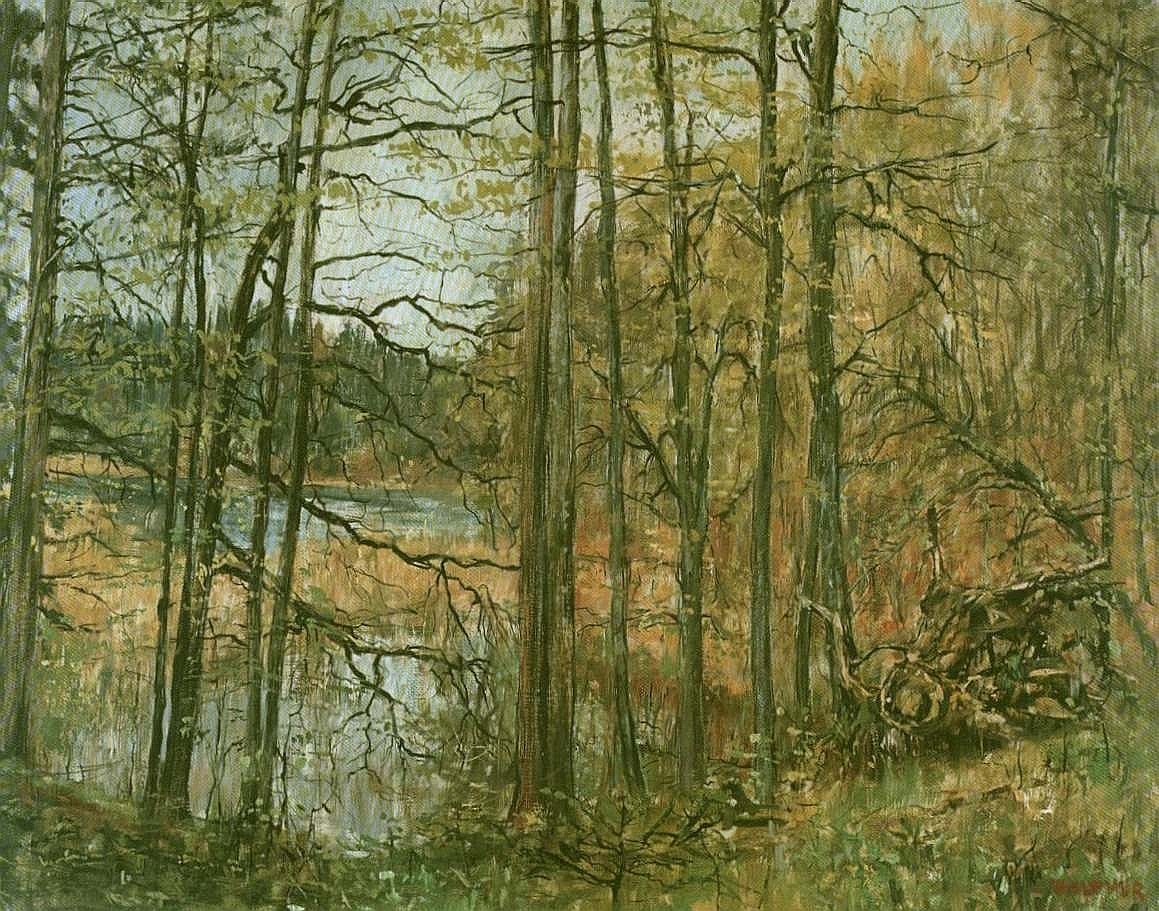
Forest idyll at Frechensee (1956)

Walther's enthusiasm for the outdoors motivated the artist to capture the play of light and color at any season and to reproduce its changing moods in his paintings. Absolutely pristine landscapes rarely occur in his works. Often, the view goes from a village into the wider environment; conversely, one sees small localities in the background. A wooden house, a fence, a bridge can be integrated into the landscape, and even the forests show, indirectly, the presence of man. Under grey clouds, snowy landscapes show the gloom of winter. In the spring, lime green, almost yellow-green tones of fresh foliage and blossoms break new ground. Summer shines in rich, often blond color, while autumn with its play of colors shows all the nuances of the palette, only sporadically brown leaves on thin branches can be found during fall, and the sky already announces the first snow of the new winter.

With particular passion, Walther was devoted to forestscapes as a special discipline of landscape painting. These paintings account for nearly a quarter of his total work. Again and again, at any time of year and day and in all weathers, the artist was tempted into nature. Here, he created some very large-scale paintings, but without the romantic exaggeration of the 19th century. Initially, he was inspired to paint by the lowland forests in the Leipzig region (especially the riparian forest of Leutzsch), and later the Spreewald in Berlin. After moving to Lake Starnberg, the artist was offered almost unlimited opportunities for his search for subjects in the immediate area of Bernried.

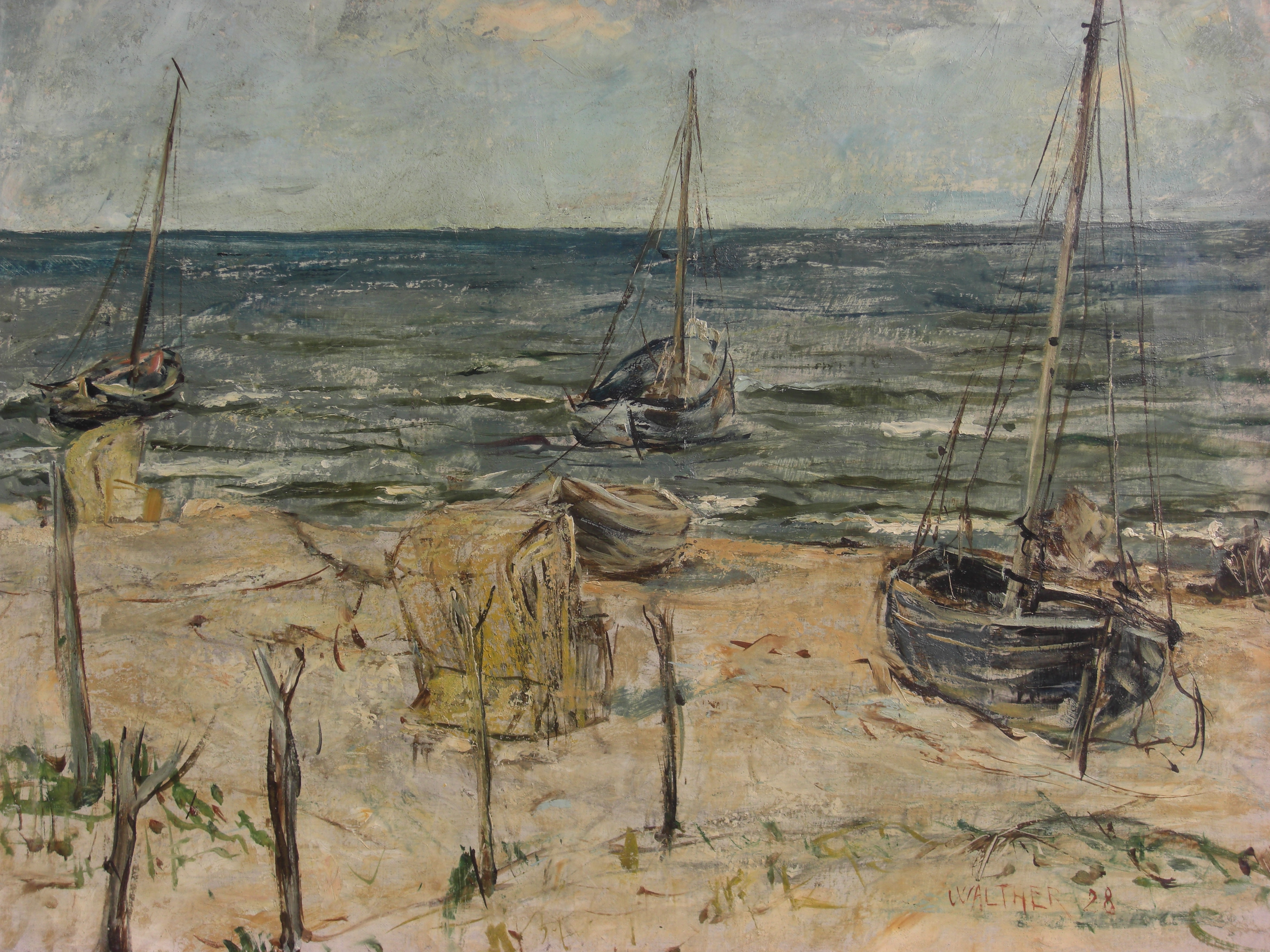
Boats on the beach at Carlshagen (1928)

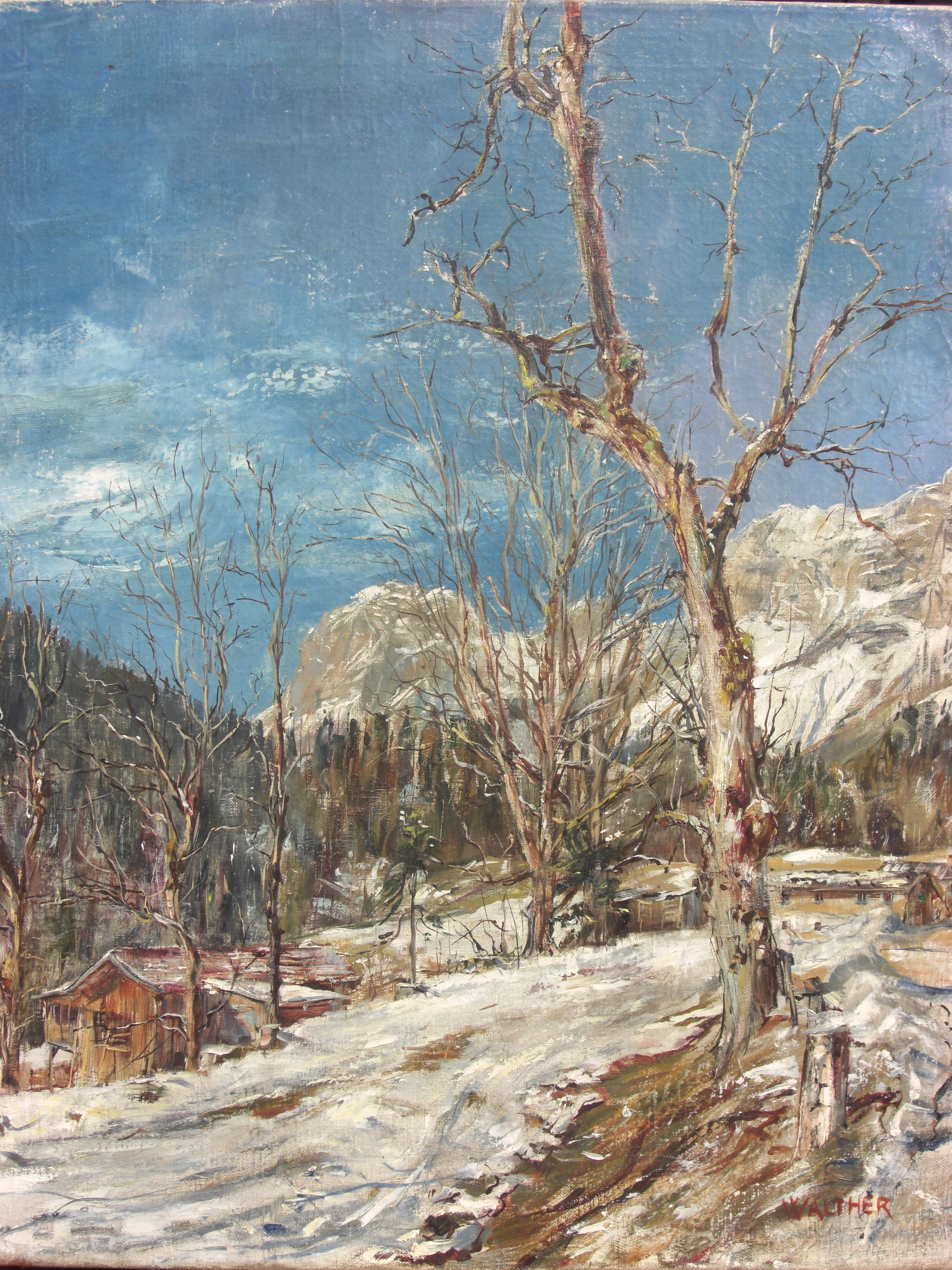
Winter landscape near Berchtesgaden (1953)

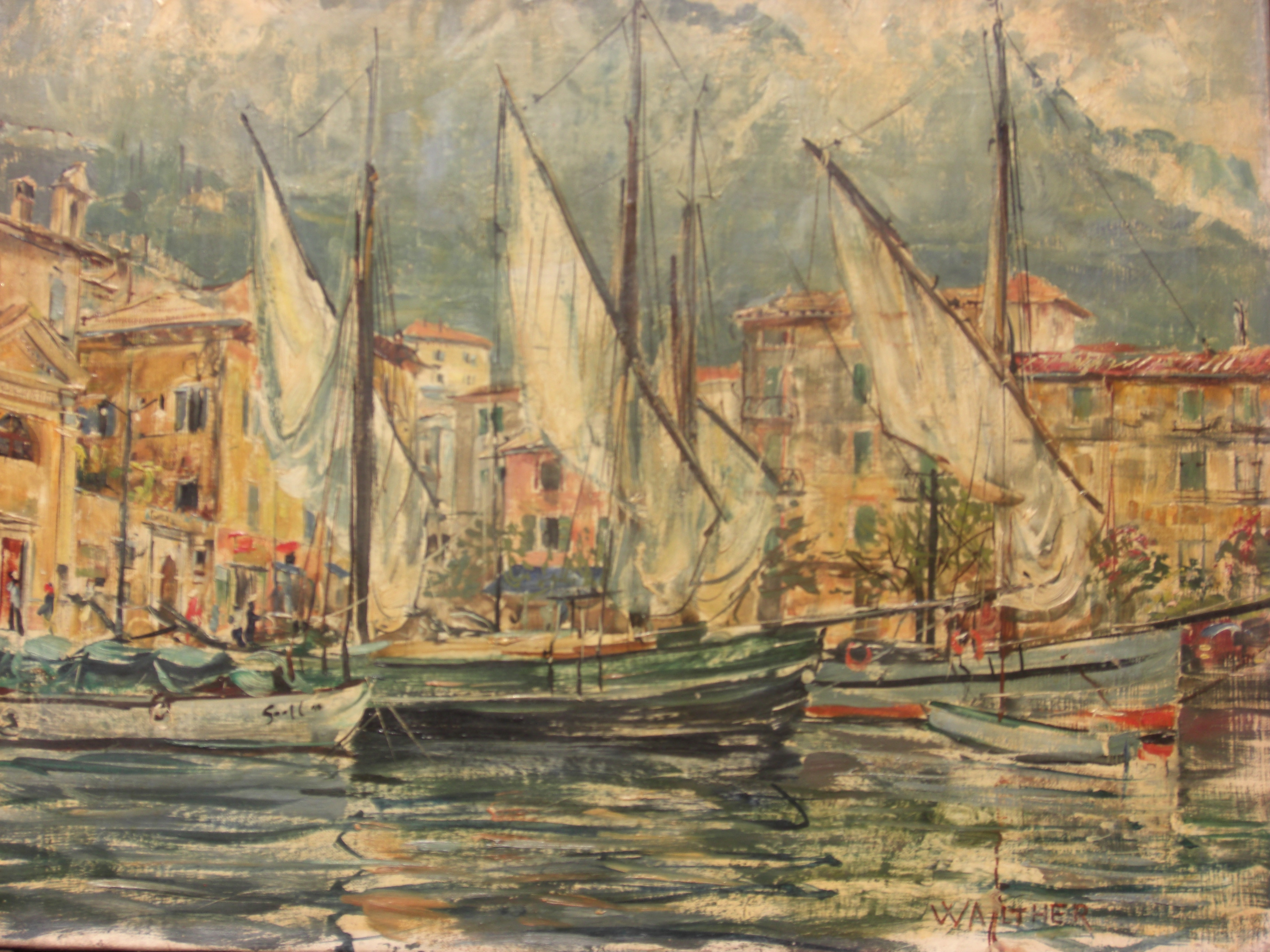
Sailing boats in the harbor of Malcesine (1960)

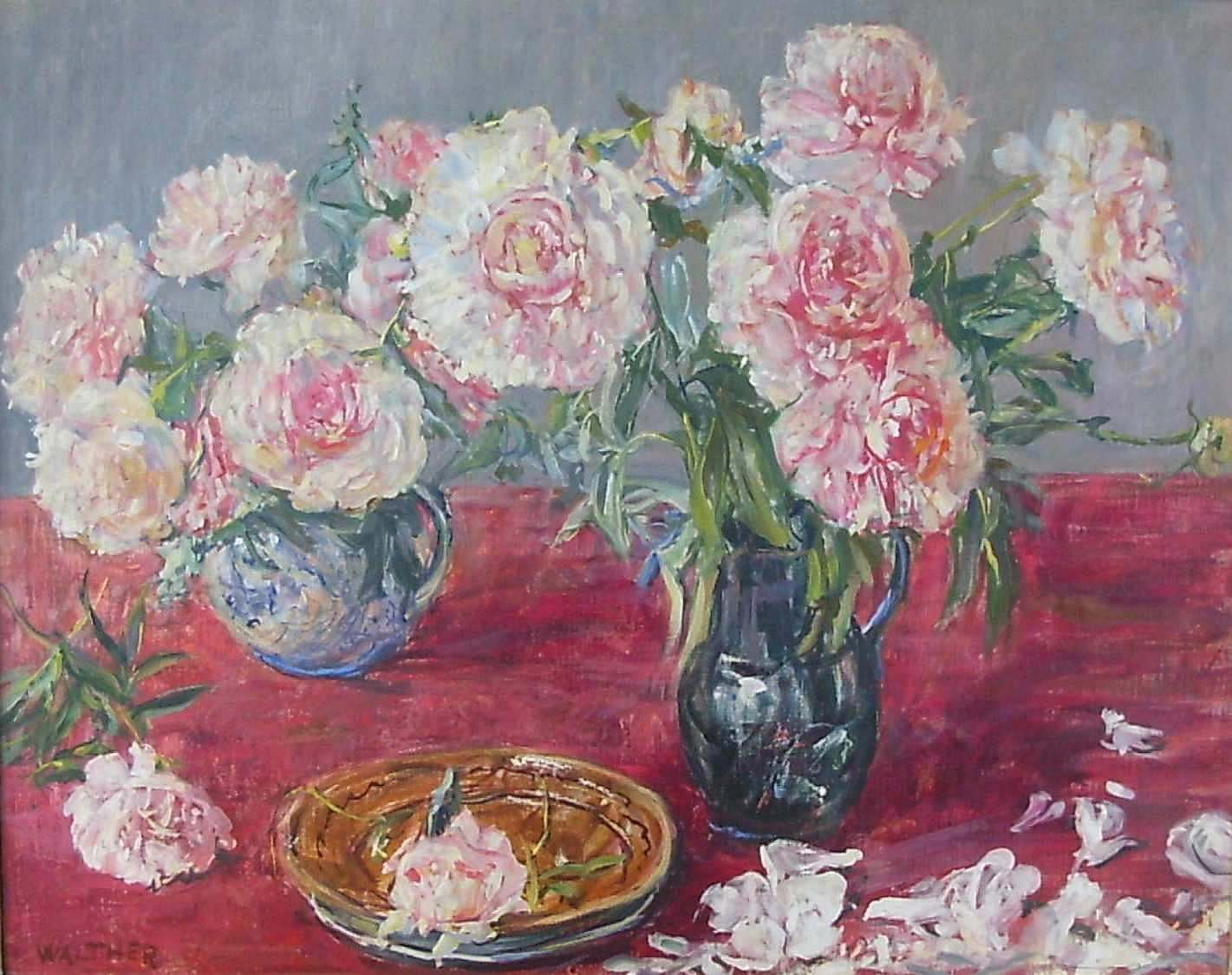
White peonies on red (1970)

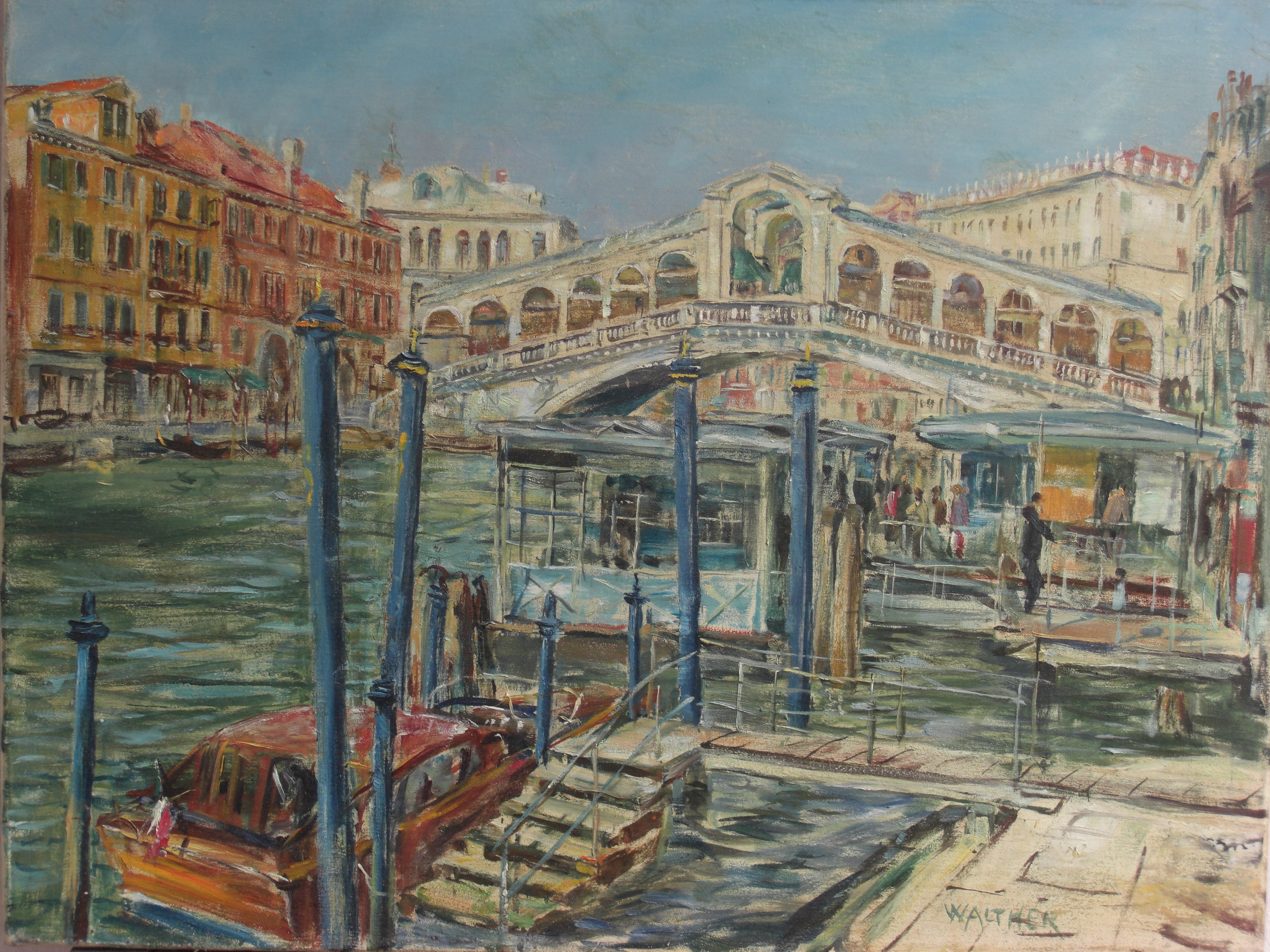
Embarkation point near the Rialto Bridge (1975)

== Exhibitions (selection) ==
- 1946 Special exhibition of Karl Walther, art shop Blum, Munich
- 1995 Retrospective in honour on his 90th birthday, Historical Museum, Leipzig
- 2005 Karl Walther (1905–1981): A late impressionist – retrospective , gallery of BayernLB, Munich
- 2008 Architecture and Landscape , Wimmer art gallery, Munich

== Museums ==
The works of Walther are located in many private collections and public galleries such as the Lenbachhaus in Munich, the art collections of Chemnitz, the Grassi Museum in Leipzig, the Museum of Fine Arts, Boston, the Kunsthalle Mannheim or the Staatsgalerie Stuttgart. The cultural museum of Würzburg owns 19 paintings, representing the largest collection in public hands.

== Honours ==
In 1932, Karl Walther received the Albrecht Dürer-award and in 1942 the Veit Stoss-award of the City of Nuremberg.

== Literature ==
- Richard G. Braungart: Karl Walther, Werk und Werden eines Impressionisten, Munich 1947.
- Josef Kern: Karl Walther, Leben und Werk, with register of the oil paintings, Würzburg 1995.
