= Melhania virescens =

Scientific classification
- Kingdom: Plantae
- Clade: Tracheophytes
- Clade: Angiosperms
- Clade: Eudicots
- Clade: Rosids
- Order: Malvales
- Family: Malvaceae
- Genus: Melhania
- Species: M. virescens

Binomial name
- Melhania virescens K.Schum.

Synonyms
- Melhania bolusii Burtt Davy

Species of flowering plant

Melhania virescens is a plant in the mallow family Malvaceae, native to southern Africa.

== Description ==
Melhania virescens grows as a small shrub 5–30 centimetres (2–12 in) tall. The leaves are silver-grey stellate tomentose, shaped oblong elliptic and measure up to 5 cm (2 in) long. Inflorescences generally have solitary flowers, occasionally two-flowered. The flowers feature yellow petals.

== Distribution and habitat ==
Melhania virescens is native to Botswana, Namibia and South Africa (Cape Provinces, Northern Provinces). Its habitat is in limy soils.
