= Cyperus castaneus =

Scientific classification
- Kingdom: Plantae
- Clade: Tracheophytes
- Clade: Angiosperms
- Clade: Monocots
- Clade: Commelinids
- Order: Poales
- Family: Cyperaceae
- Genus: Cyperus
- Species: C. castaneus

Binomial name
- Cyperus castaneus Willd.

Species of plant endemic to Australia

Cyperus castaneus is a sedge of the family Cyperaceae that is native to parts of northern Australia, southern Africa, India, and south east Asia.

The annual or perennial sedge typically grows to a height of 1 to 50 centimetres (0.4 to 19.7 in). The plant blooms between February and July, and produces yellow-brown flowers.

In Western Australia, it is found around clay pans and other damp areas, such as the Kimberley, Pilbara and Goldfields-Esperance regions. It is also found in Queensland and the Northern Territory. In Africa, it is found in Namibia and the Northern Provinces of South Africa. In Asia, its range extends from India in the west to China in the east, and to Indonesia and Borneo in the south.

There are two known varieties of the species:

- Cyperus castaneus var. brevimucronatus Kük.
- Cyperus castaneus Willd. var. castaneus

== See also ==
- List of Cyperus species
