= Otto Hauser =

Swiss historian

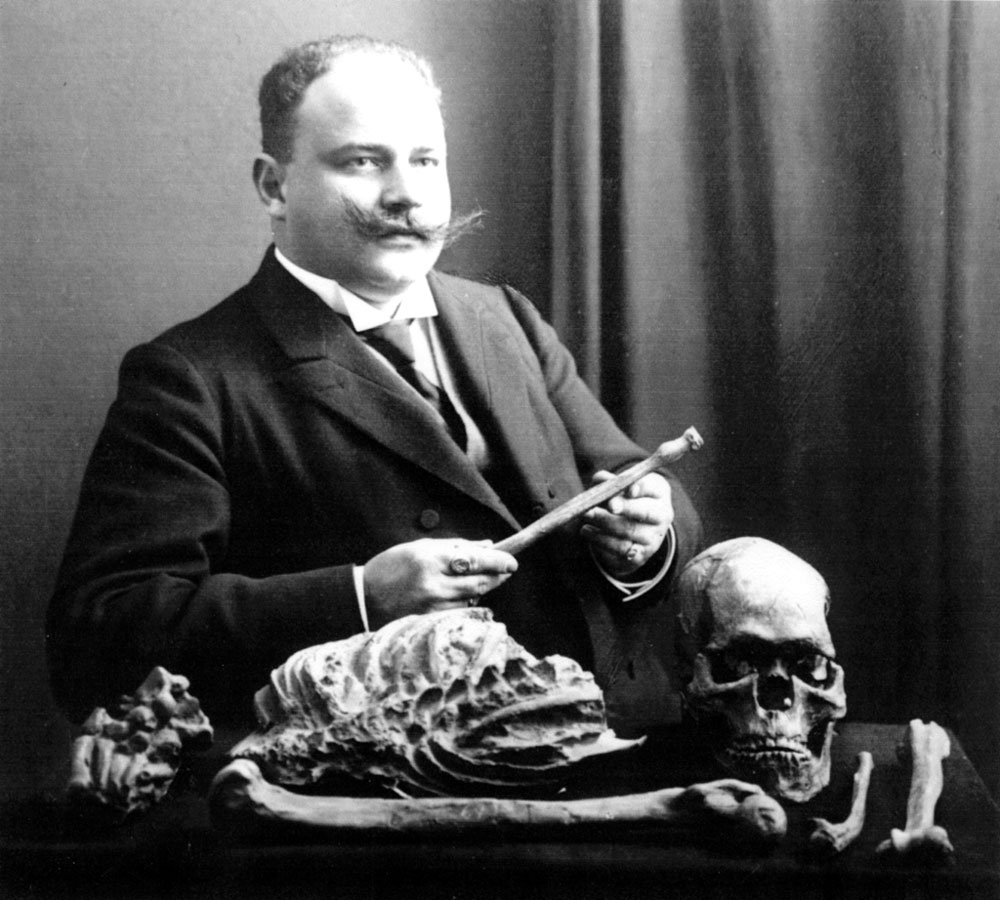
Otto Hauser and the Combe-Capelle fossils (1909)

Otto Hauser (April 12/27, 1874, in Wädenswil – June 14/19, 1932, in Berlin) was a Swiss prehistorian.

== Literary works ==
- Der Mensch vor 100,000 Jahren, 1917.
- Ins Paradies des Urmenschen, 1922.

== Sources ==
- "Otto Hauser." In Biographical Dictionary of the History of Paleoanthropology. Edited by Matthew R. Goodrum. (2016) available at https://drive.google.com/file/d/13Dj9JqKO-9LwCs8JE88wpL5p4XuLhGi_/view
- Rudolf Drößler: Flucht aus dem Paradies: Leben, Ausgrabungen und Entdeckungen Otto Hausers. Halle, 1988
- Delluc B. et G. : "Otto Hauser était-il un espion allemand? Biographie", in: Petites énigmes et grands mystères, IV, Pilote 24 édition, 2010, p. 80 à 157, ill.
