= Melhania polyneura =

Conservation status
- Critically endangered, possibly extinct (IUCN 3.1)

Scientific classification
- Kingdom: Plantae
- Clade: Tracheophytes
- Clade: Angiosperms
- Clade: Eudicots
- Clade: Rosids
- Order: Malvales
- Family: Malvaceae
- Genus: Melhania
- Species: M. polyneura

Binomial name
- Melhania polyneura K.Schum.

Species of plant

Melhania polyneura is a plant in the family Malvaceae.

== Description ==
Melhania polyneura grows as a herb up to 20 centimetres (8 in) tall. The oblong or ovate leaves are tomentose and measure up to 4 cm (2 in) long. Inflorescences are four-flowered. The flowers have yellow petals.

== Distribution and habitat ==
The type specimen of Melhania polyneura, no longer extant, was collected in 1895 in Mwanza District, Tanzania. Its habitat may have been in wooded grasslands at altitudes of about 1,200 m (4,000 ft). Changes in area land use to small farms since the initial specimen have resulted in the IUCN assessment as Critically Endangered.
