= Melhania damarana =

Scientific classification
- Kingdom: Plantae
- Clade: Tracheophytes
- Clade: Angiosperms
- Clade: Eudicots
- Clade: Rosids
- Order: Malvales
- Family: Malvaceae
- Genus: Melhania
- Species: M. damarana

Binomial name
- Melhania damarana Harv.

Species of flowering plant

Melhania damarana is a plant in the family Malvaceae, native to southern Africa.

== Description ==
Melhania damarana grows as a shrub 30–60 centimetres (12–24 in) tall, with several stems from a woody base. The leaves measure up to 7 cm (3 in) long and are densely stellate tomentose to finely stellate pubescent. Inflorescences are one to three-flowered, on a stalk measuring up to 4.5 cm (2 in) long and feature yellow petals.

== Distribution and habitat ==
Melhania damarana is native to Botswana, Namibia and South Africa (Cape Provinces). Its habitat is in dry areas on the fringes of the Namib desert.
