= Kayna =

- Stadtteil of Zeitz
- Interactive map of Kayna
- Location within Germany Location within Saxony-Anhalt
- Coordinates: 50°59′N 12°14′E
- Country: Germany
- State: Saxony-Anhalt
- District: Burgenlandkreis
- Town: Zeitz

Area
  - Total: 13.87 km^{2} (5.36 sq mi)
- Elevation: 271 m (889 ft)

Population (2006-12-31)
  - Total: 1,483
  - Density: 106.9/km^{2} (276.9/sq mi)
- Time zone: UTC+01:00 (CET)
  - Summer (DST): UTC+02:00 (CEST)
- Postal codes: 06724
- Dialling codes: 034426
- Vehicle registration: BLK
- Website: www.zeitz.de

Kayna is a village and a former municipality in the Burgenlandkreis district, in Saxony-Anhalt, Germany. Since 1 July 2009, it is part of the town Zeitz.
