= Nonnewitz =

- Stadtteil of Zeitz
- Interactive map of Nonnewitz
- Location within Germany Location within Saxony-Anhalt
- Coordinates: 51°5′N 12°7′E
- Country: Germany
- State: Saxony-Anhalt
- District: Burgenlandkreis
- Town: Zeitz

Area
  - Total: 5.72 km^{2} (2.21 sq mi)
- Elevation: 192 m (630 ft)

Population (2006-12-31)
  - Total: 841
  - Density: 147/km^{2} (381/sq mi)
- Time zone: UTC+01:00 (CET)
  - Summer (DST): UTC+02:00 (CEST)
- Postal codes: 06727
- Dialling codes: 03441
- Website: www.zeitz.de

Nonnewitz is a village and a former municipality in the Burgenlandkreis district, in Saxony-Anhalt, Germany. Since 1 July 2009, it is part of the town Zeitz.
