= Geußnitz =

- Stadtteil of Zeitz
- Interactive map of Geußnitz
- Location within Germany Location within Saxony-Anhalt
- Coordinates: 51°1′N 12°11′E
- Country: Germany
- State: Saxony-Anhalt
- District: Burgenlandkreis
- Town: Zeitz

Area
  - Total: 7.55 km^{2} (2.92 sq mi)
- Elevation: 258 m (846 ft)

Population (2006-12-31)
  - Total: 662
  - Density: 87.7/km^{2} (227/sq mi)
- Time zone: UTC+01:00 (CET)
  - Summer (DST): UTC+02:00 (CEST)
- Postal codes: 06712
- Dialling codes: 034423
- Website: www.zeitz.de

Geußnitz is a village and a former municipality in the Burgenlandkreis district, in Saxony-Anhalt, Germany. Since 1 July 2009, it is part of the town Zeitz.
