= Melhania substricta =

Scientific classification
- Kingdom: Plantae
- Clade: Tracheophytes
- Clade: Angiosperms
- Clade: Eudicots
- Clade: Rosids
- Order: Malvales
- Family: Malvaceae
- Genus: Melhania
- Species: M. substricta

Binomial name
- Melhania substricta Dorr

Species of plant

Melhania substricta is a plant in the family Malvaceae, native to East Africa and Yemen.

== Description ==
Melhania substricta grows as a subshrub up to 50 centimetres (20 in) tall. The elliptic to ovate leaves are tomentose, coloured greenish above. They measure up to 3.6 cm (1 in) long. Inflorescences are solitary, or rarely two-flowered. The flowers have bright yellow petals.

== Distribution and habitat ==
Melhania substricta is native to Eritrea, Ethiopia, Kenya, Somalia and Yemen. Its habitat is in Acacia-Commiphora bushland or woodland at altitudes of 400–500 m (1,300–1,600 ft). The species is only known from about ten sites and is considered vulnerable.
