= Melhania parviflora =

Scientific classification
- Kingdom: Plantae
- Clade: Tracheophytes
- Clade: Angiosperms
- Clade: Eudicots
- Clade: Rosids
- Order: Malvales
- Family: Malvaceae
- Genus: Melhania
- Species: M. parviflora

Binomial name
- Melhania parviflora Chiov.

Species of plant

Melhania parviflora is a species of flowering plant in the family Malvaceae, native to East Africa.

== Description ==
Melhania parviflora grows as a suffrutex (subshrub) or shrub up to 0.5 metres (2 ft) tall. The elliptic, oblong or ovate leaves are velvety and measure up to 7 cm (3 in) long. Inflorescences are two to four-flowered, or have solitary flowers, on a stalk measuring up to 2.2 cm (1 in) long. The flowers have yellow petals.

== Distribution and habitat ==
Melhania parviflora is native to Ethiopia, Kenya, Somalia, Tanzania and Uganda. Its habitat is in Acacia-Commiphora woodland and coastal bushland to altitudes of about 1,400 m (4,600 ft).
