= Melhania rotundata =

Scientific classification
- Kingdom: Plantae
- Clade: Tracheophytes
- Clade: Angiosperms
- Clade: Eudicots
- Clade: Rosids
- Order: Malvales
- Family: Malvaceae
- Genus: Melhania
- Species: M. rotundata

Binomial name
- Melhania rotundata Hochst. ex Mast.

Synonyms
- Melhania cyclophylla Hochst. ex Mast.; Melhania taylorii Baker f.

Species of plant

Melhania rotundata is a species of flowering plant in the family Malvaceae, native to East Africa.

== Description ==
Melhania rotundata grows as a herb or subshrub up to 70 centimetres (28 in) tall, rarely to 1 metre (3 ft 3 in). The round to ovate leaves are tomentose, coloured greyish-green. They measure up to 6.2 cm (2 in) long. Inflorescences may have a solitary flower or be two or three-flowered with a stalk up to 5.5 cm (2 in) long. The flowers have bright yellow petals.

== Distribution and habitat ==
Melhania rotundata is native to Ethiopia, Kenya, Somalia and Tanzania. Its habitat is in Acacia-Commiphora bushland or woodland at altitudes of 100–1,150 m (300–3,800 ft).
