= Melhania polygama =

Scientific classification
- Kingdom: Plantae
- Clade: Tracheophytes
- Clade: Angiosperms
- Clade: Eudicots
- Clade: Rosids
- Order: Malvales
- Family: Malvaceae
- Genus: Melhania
- Species: M. polygama

Binomial name
- Melhania polygama I.Verd.

Species of flowering plant

Melhania polygama is a plant in the mallow family Malvaceae, native to South Africa.

== Description ==
Melhania polygama grows as a shrub about 35 centimetres (14 in) tall, with numerous stems. The leaves are stellate tomentose and measure up to 9 cm (4 in) long. Inflorescences measure up to 6 cm (2 in) long, are typically one to three-flowered and feature yellow petals. Uniquely within the genus Melhania, the flowers are polygamous.

== Distribution and habitat ==
Melhania polygama is known only from Hluhluwe–Imfolozi Park (formerly Umfolozi Game Reserve) in KwaZulu-Natal. Its habitat is on grassy hill slopes.
