= Melhania latibracteolata =

Scientific classification
- Kingdom: Plantae
- Clade: Tracheophytes
- Clade: Angiosperms
- Clade: Eudicots
- Clade: Rosids
- Order: Malvales
- Family: Malvaceae
- Genus: Melhania
- Species: M. latibracteolata

Binomial name
- Melhania latibracteolata Dorr

Species of plant

Melhania latibracteolata is a plant in the family Malvaceae, native to East Africa.

== Description ==
Melhania latibracteolata grows as a suffrutex (subshrub) up to 0.4 metres (1 ft) tall. The elliptic to ovate leaves are tomentose and measure up to 7.5 cm (3 in) long. Inflorescences are two to five-flowered, on a stalk measuring up to 1.5 cm (1 in) long. The flowers have pale yellow petals.

== Distribution and habitat ==
Melhania latibracteolata is native to Ethiopia, Kenya and Somalia. It is known from fewer than 10 sites. Its habitat is in Acacia-Commiphora bushlands at altitudes of about 450–900 m (1,500–3,000 ft).
