= Melhania annua =

Scientific classification
- Kingdom: Plantae
- Clade: Tracheophytes
- Clade: Angiosperms
- Clade: Eudicots
- Clade: Rosids
- Order: Malvales
- Family: Malvaceae
- Genus: Melhania
- Species: M. annua

Binomial name
- Melhania annua Thulin

Species of plant

Melhania annua is a plant in the family Malvaceae, native to East Africa.

== Description ==
Melhania annua grows as an annual herb, up to 30 centimetres (12 in) tall. The pubescent leaves are ovate to obovate and measure up to 6.2 cm (2 in) long. Inflorescences are solitary or two or three-flowered, on a stalk measuring up to 3 cm (1 in) long. The flowers have yellow petals.

== Distribution and habitat ==
Melhania annua is native to Somalia and Kenya. Only 12 specimen sites are known. Its habitat is coastal sand dunes.
