= Melhania phillipsiae =

Conservation status
- Least Concern (IUCN 3.1)

Scientific classification
- Kingdom: Plantae
- Clade: Tracheophytes
- Clade: Angiosperms
- Clade: Eudicots
- Clade: Rosids
- Order: Malvales
- Family: Malvaceae
- Genus: Melhania
- Species: M. phillipsiae

Binomial name
- Melhania phillipsiae Baker f.

Synonyms
- Melhania fiorii Chiov.; Melhania grandibracteata (K.Schum.) K.Schum.

Species of plant

Melhania phillipsiae is a plant in the family Malvaceae. It is native to Africa and the Arabian Peninsula.

== Description ==
Melhania phillipsiae grows as a shrub up to 2 metres (7 ft) tall. The ovate leaves are tomentose and measure up to 12 cm (5 in) long. Inflorescences are two to six-flowered on a stalk measuring up to 5 cm (2 in) long. The flowers have yellow petals.

== Distribution and habitat ==
Melhania phillipsiae is native to an area from Niger east to the Arabian Peninsula. Its habitat is in Acacia-Commiphora scrub. In Oman, Saudi Arabia and Yemen it occurs on mountain slopes.
