= Dennhardt =

Dennhardt is a surname. Notable people with the surname include:

- Christine Hohmann-Dennhardt (born 1950), German politician and judge
- Frank Dennhardt (born 1967), German tennis player
- Julius H. Dennhardt (1869–1929), American auctioneer, businessman and politician
- Oskar-Hubert Dennhardt (1915–2014), German Major in the Wehrmacht during World War II

== See also ==
- Denhardt
