= Melhania randii =

Scientific classification
- Kingdom: Plantae
- Clade: Tracheophytes
- Clade: Angiosperms
- Clade: Eudicots
- Clade: Rosids
- Order: Malvales
- Family: Malvaceae
- Genus: Melhania
- Species: M. randii

Binomial name
- Melhania randii Baker f.

Species of flowering plant

Melhania randii is a plant in the mallow family Malvaceae, native to southern Africa. It is named for the English doctor and plant collector R.F. Rand (1856–1937).

== Description ==
Melhania randii grows as a small shrub 6–60 centimetres (2–24 in) tall, with several woody stems. The leaves are stellate tomentose and measure up to 9 cm (4 in) long. Inflorescences are typically one to three-flowered and feature yellow petals.

== Distribution and habitat ==
Melhania randii is native to Malawi, Mozambique, South Africa (Northern Provinces), Eswatini, Tanzania and Zimbabwe. Its numerous habitats include grassland and mountain summits. The discontinuous nature of the species' distribution has resulted in differences in plants from different colonies, such as Transvaal (now Northern Provinces) specimens being generally broader than their Zimbabwe counterparts.
