= Melhania angustifolia =

Scientific classification
- Kingdom: Plantae
- Clade: Tracheophytes
- Clade: Angiosperms
- Clade: Eudicots
- Clade: Rosids
- Order: Malvales
- Family: Malvaceae
- Genus: Melhania
- Species: M. angustifolia

Binomial name
- Melhania angustifolia K.Schum.

Species of plant

Melhania angustifolia is a plant in the family Malvaceae. It is endemic to Zanzibar.

== Description ==
Melhania angustifolia grows as a suffrutex (subshrub) or shrub up to 2 metres (6 ft 7 in) tall. The ovate to oblong leaves measure up to 8.3 cm (3 in) long. Inflorescences are two or three-flowered, on a stalk measuring up to 4 cm (2 in) long. The flowers have bright yellow petals.

== Distribution and habitat ==
Melhania angustifolia is native to the Zanzibar Archipelago where only seven specimens are known and the species is threatened by tourism-linked development. Its habitat is in bushland or on sand, near sea level.
