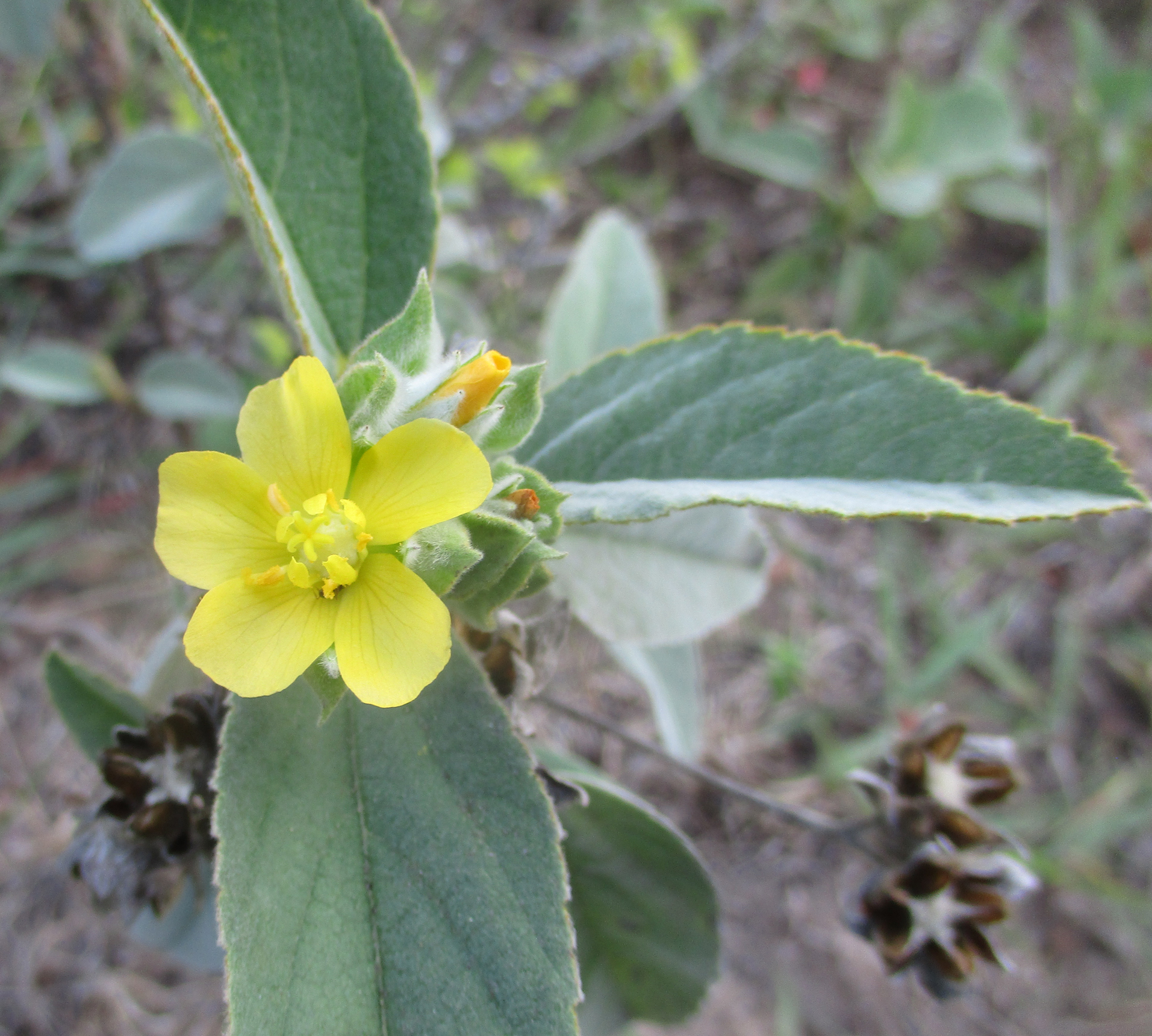
- In Botswana

Scientific classification
- Kingdom: Plantae
- Clade: Tracheophytes
- Clade: Angiosperms
- Clade: Eudicots
- Clade: Rosids
- Order: Malvales
- Family: Malvaceae
- Genus: Melhania
- Species: M. forbesii

Binomial name
- Melhania forbesii Planch. ex Mast.

Synonyms
- Melhania serrulata R.E.Fr.

= Melhania forbesii =

Species of flowering plant

Melhania forbesii is a plant in the mallow family Malvaceae, native to southern Africa. It is named for the English naturalist and plant collector John Forbes.

== Description ==
Melhania forbesii grows as a small shrub about 60 centimetres (24 in) tall, with a branched stem. The leaves are tomentose and measure up to 11 cm (4 in) long. Inflorescences may be one to four-flowered, generally three-flowered. The flowers feature yellow petals.

== Distribution and habitat ==
Melhania forbesii is native to Angola, Botswana, Mozambique, Namibia, South Africa (KwaZulu-Natal, Northern Provinces), Eswatini, Zambia and Zimbabwe. Its habitat includes sandy areas, open woodland, by rivers and on hillsides.
