= Melhania volleseniana =

Scientific classification
- Kingdom: Plantae
- Clade: Tracheophytes
- Clade: Angiosperms
- Clade: Eudicots
- Clade: Rosids
- Order: Malvales
- Family: Malvaceae
- Genus: Melhania
- Species: M. volleseniana

Binomial name
- Melhania volleseniana Dorr

Species of plant

Melhania volleseniana is a plant in the family Malvaceae, native to East Africa.

== Description ==
Melhania volleseniana grows as a herb up to 50 centimetres (20 in) tall. The ovate to elliptic leaves measure up to 7 cm (3 in) long. The leaves are pubescent above and lanate (woolly) below. Inflorescences may have a solitary flower or have two or three-flowered cymes on a stalk up to 2 cm (1 in) long. The flowers have yellow petals.

== Distribution and habitat ==
Melhania volleseniana is native to Ethiopia, Kenya and Somalia. The species is only known from about 15 sites. Its habitat is in Acacia-Commiphora bushland or Combretum grassland at altitudes of 290–700 m (1,000–2,300 ft).
