= Döbris =

- Stadtteil of Zeitz
- Interactive map of Döbris
- Location within Germany Location within Saxony-Anhalt
- Coordinates: 51°6′38″N 12°9′52″E
- Country: Germany
- State: Saxony-Anhalt
- District: Burgenlandkreis
- Town: Zeitz

Area
  - Total: 8.91 km^{2} (3.44 sq mi)
- Elevation: 160 m (520 ft)

Population (2006-12-31)
  - Total: 71
  - Density: 8.0/km^{2} (21/sq mi)
- Time zone: UTC+01:00 (CET)
  - Summer (DST): UTC+02:00 (CEST)
- Postal codes: 06727
- Dialling codes: 03441
- Vehicle registration: BLK
- Website: www.zeitz.de

Döbris is a former municipality in the Burgenlandkreis district, in Saxony-Anhalt, Germany. Since 1 July 2009, it is part of the town Zeitz.
