= Luckenau =

- Stadtteil of Zeitz
- Interactive map of Luckenau
- Location within Germany Location within Saxony-Anhalt
- Coordinates: 51°05′N 12°05′E
- Country: Germany
- State: Saxony-Anhalt
- District: Burgenlandkreis
- Town: Zeitz

Area
  - Total: 6.91 km^{2} (2.67 sq mi)
- Elevation: 188 m (617 ft)

Population (2006-12-31)
  - Total: 593
  - Density: 85.8/km^{2} (222/sq mi)
- Time zone: UTC+01:00 (CET)
  - Summer (DST): UTC+02:00 (CEST)
- Postal codes: 06727
- Dialling codes: 03441
- Website: www.zeitz.de

Luckenau is a village and a former municipality in the Burgenlandkreis district, in Saxony-Anhalt, Germany. Since 1 January 2010, it is part of the town Zeitz.
