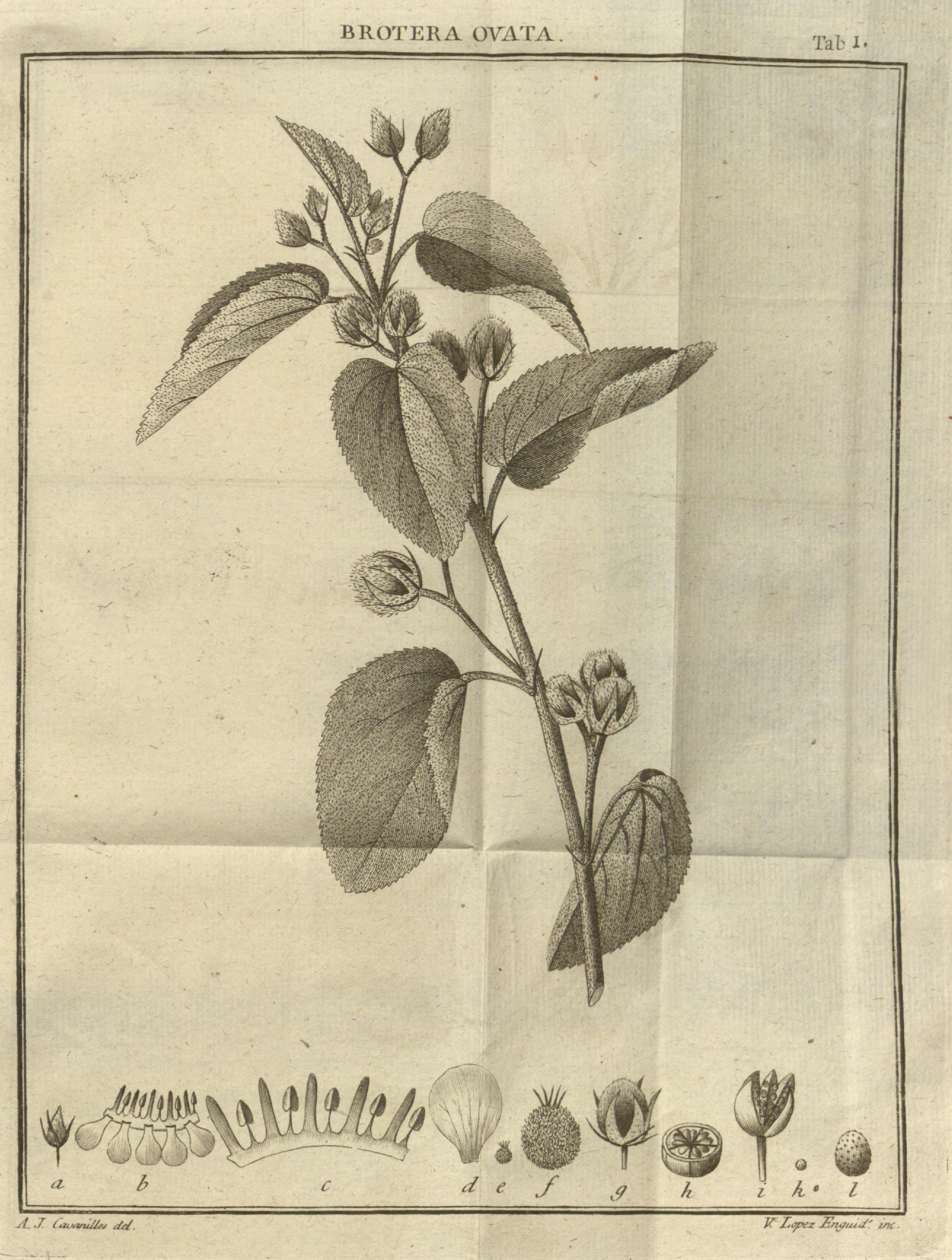
- Anales de historia natural (Tab. 1)

Scientific classification
- Kingdom: Plantae
- Clade: Tracheophytes
- Clade: Angiosperms
- Clade: Eudicots
- Clade: Rosids
- Order: Malvales
- Family: Malvaceae
- Genus: Melhania
- Species: M. ovata

Binomial name
- Melhania ovata (Cav.) Spreng.

Synonyms
- Brotera leprieurii Guill. & Perr.; Brotera ovata Cav.; Hibiscus azbenicus Miré & H.Gillet; Melhania abyssinica A.Rich.; Melhania leprieurii (Guill. & Perr.) Webb; Melhania oblongata Hochst. ex Mast.; Melochia ovata (Cav.) Desf.; Pentapetes leprieurii (Guill. & Perr.) Steud.; Sprengelia modesta Schult.

= Melhania ovata =

Species of plant

Melhania ovata is a plant in the family Malvaceae.

== Description ==
Melhania ovata grows as a suffrutex (subshrub) or shrub up to 1 metre (3 ft) tall. The elliptic to ovate leaves are tomentose above and measure up to 8.5 cm (3 in) long. Inflorescences are two to three-flowered or have solitary flowers, on a stalk measuring up to 4.5 cm (2 in) long. The flowers have yellow petals.

== Distribution and habitat ==
Melhania ovata is native to tropical Africa, the Arabian Peninsula and Pakistan. In Pakistan, it was known from Balochistan but rare and considered possibly introduced. Its habitat is in grassland and wooded bushland at altitudes of about 500–1,900 m (1,600–6,200 ft).
