= Richard G. Braungart =

American academic

- Born: Baltimore, Maryland
- Education: University of Maryland (B.A., M.A.); Pennsylvania State University (Ph.D.)
- Known for: Political sociology, youth movements and generations, life course and generational politics
- Spouse: Margaret Mitchell (m. 1964)
- Children: 3
- Awards: Syracuse University Outstanding Teacher of the Year Award (2000)

Richard G. Braungart is an American sociologist and political scientist, who is professor emeritus in the Maxwell School of Citizenship and Public Affairs at Syracuse University. His major work is in the fields of political sociology and youth movements and generational politics.

In political sociology, he was a Founding Member of the Political Sociology Section in the American Sociological Association (ASA). He was also the founder and first Series Editor for Research in Political Sociology, published in cooperation with the Political Sociology Section of the ASA. He served as the President of the Committee on Political Sociology (CPS), jointly affiliated with both the International Sociological Association and the International Political Science Association. He developed a political sociology paradigm focusing on the social roots of politics, the politics of politics, and the effects of politics on society.

In the area of youth movements and generational politics, Braungart was a Senior Staff Consultant, Associate, and Research Director for the President's Commission on Campus Unrest (Scranton Commission, 1970), and he consulted and participated in International Planning Meetings with the United Nations Youth Unit in New York City. Many of his professional efforts have been devoted to the study of life course and generational politics from comparative, historical, national, and international perspectives.

== Early life and education ==
Richard Gottfried Braungart was born on April 21, 1935, in Baltimore, Maryland. His mother, Jean Mary (née Stanton) Braungart, grew up in East Baltimore, and his father, Paul P. Braungart, emigrated from Frankfurt, Germany to the United States in 1928. He attended Catholic schools, graduating from Mount Saint Joseph High School in 1954. After graduation, he was drafted into the U.S. Army and sent to West Germany, where he served on active duty in the Medical Corps with the 22nd Infantry Regiment, 4th Infantry Division.

After completing military service, Braungart attended the University of Maryland, where he received his undergraduate degree in sociology (1961) and his master's degree (1963).

== Research Interest ==
Braungart received his Ph.D. in Sociology from the Pennsylvania State University in 1969. His research on student activism began at Penn State with a term paper he wrote for a political sociology class during the 1960s campus protests.

His term paper was co-authored with his course professor (David L. Westby) and published in the American Sociological Review. He subsequently received a grant from Penn State to survey over 1200 political left, right, and moderate student activist groups at Penn State and other colleges and universities. The research findings from his 1969 doctoral dissertation—"Family Status, Socialization, and Student Politics: A Multivariate Analysis"—were published in numerous sociology journals. including the American Journal of Sociology, and the Sociology of Education.

His research on youth movements and generational politics has continued for more than 55 years. From the 1980s on, he identified and assessed historical patterns of youth movement activity around the world from the 19th to the 21st centuries. He and Margaret developed the new interdisciplinary area of study called "Life Course and Generational Politics." In 2023, they co-edited Youth Movements and Generational Politics, 19th–21st Centuries (Anthem Press), which is a collection of their previously published articles and an assessment of youth movements around the world in the early 21st century.

== Academic career ==
Braungart's first faculty appointment was at the Pennsylvania State University as instructor of sociology (1966–1969). After receiving his Ph.D., he was on the faculty in the Department of Sociology at the University of Maryland (1969–1972). He then joined the faculty at the Maxwell School of Citizenship and Public Affairs at Syracuse University, where he held joint appointments in the Departments of Sociology, Political Science, and International Relations (1972–2002). In 2000, he received the Outstanding Teacher of the Year Award from the Syracuse University Alumni Association.

Braungart was a Book Review Editor, Political Sociology Guest Editor, and member of the Editorial Boards of sociology and political science journals. Throughout his professional career, Braungart formed alliances, consulted, lectured, and contributed to youth research centers in the United States, Canada, Mexico, Germany, Russia, Bulgaria, Poland, India, China, South Africa, South Korea, Norway, and the United Nations. He served as a member and delegate for the Coalition for National Service, Washington, D.C. (1986–1995).

== Selected publications ==
Richard Braungart has had an active research and publishing career. His academic publications include over 200 books, journal articles, chapters, and reviews, many of which have been reprinted or translated into other languages.

=== Books ===
- Society and Politics: Readings in Political Sociology, Englewood Cliffs, NJ: Prentice Hall, 1976.
- Family Status, Socialization and Student Politics, Ann Arbor, MI: UMI Press. Published for the Department of Sociology, San Diego State University, San Diego, CA, 1979.
- Life Course and Generational Politics, co-edited with Margaret M. Braungart, Lanham, MD: UPA Press, 1984, 1993.
- Research in Political Sociology, Volumes 1–4, co-edited with Margaret M. Braungart, Greenwich, CT: JAI Press, 1985–1989.
- The Political Sociology of the State: Essays on the Origins, Structure, and Impact of the Modern State, co-edited with Margaret M. Braungart, Greenwich, CT: JAI Press, 1990.
- Braungart, Richard G.; Braungart, Margaret M., eds. (2023). Youth Movements and Generational Politics, 19th-21st Centuries. Anthem Press. doi:10.2307/jj.2225643. ISBN 978-1-78527-789-4. JSTOR jj.2225643.

=== Journals and Book Chapters ===
- "Political Sociology: History and Scope," in Samuel L. Long (ed.), Handbook of Political Behaviour, Volume 3, New York: Plenum Publishing Corp., 1981, pp. 1–80.
- Braungart, R. G.; Braungart, M. M. (1995). "Black and white South African university students' perceptions of self and country: an exploratory study". South African Journal of Sociology. 26 (3): 77–87. doi:10.1080/02580144.1995.10432057 (inactive 12 July 2025).
- Braungart, R. G.; Braungart, M. M. (Fall 1997). "Why youth in youth movements?". Mind and Human Interaction. 8 (3): 148–171. Republished as: Braungart, Richard; Braungart, Margaret (2023). "Why Youth in Youth Movements?". Youth Movements and Generational Politics, 19th-21st Centuries. Anthem Press. pp. 429–454. doi:10.2307/jj.2225643.22. ISBN 978-1-78527-789-4. JSTOR jj.2225643.22.
- Braungart, Richard G.; Braungart, Margaret M. (1997). "At Century's End: Globalization, Paradoxes, and a New Political Agenda". Journal of Political & Military Sociology. 25 (2): 343–351. JSTOR 45294216. ProQuest 206656486.
- "International Political Sociology," (with Margaret M. Braungart), in Stella Quah and Arnaud Sales (eds.), International Handbook of Sociology, London: SAGE Publications, 2000, pp. 197–217.
- "Generational Conflict," (with Margaret M. Braungart), in Lonnie R. Sherrod, Constance A.Flanagan, and Ron Kassimir (eds.), Youth Activism: An International Encyclopedia, Volume 1, Westport, CT: Greenwood Publishing Group, 2006, pp. 272–282.
- "Youth Movements," in Richard A. Shweder (Editor in Chief), The Child: An Encyclopedic Companion, Chicago, IL: University of Chicago Press, 2009, pp. 1052–1053.
- Braungart, Richard G. (2022). "Political Generation". The Wiley-Blackwell Encyclopedia of Social and Political Movements. pp. 1–5. doi:10.1002/9780470674871.wbespm157.pub2. ISBN 978-1-4051-9773-1.

== Personal life ==
In 1964, he married Margaret (née Mitchell) Braungart, who later received her Ph.D. in psychology at Syracuse University. Richard and Margaret have collaborated productively on numerous research and writing projects throughout their marriage. They have three daughters and nine grandchildren.
