= Theißen =

- Stadtteil of Zeitz
- Interactive map of Theißen
- Location within Germany Location within Saxony-Anhalt
- Coordinates: 51°5′10″N 12°6′20″E
- Country: Germany
- State: Saxony-Anhalt
- District: Burgenlandkreis
- Town: Zeitz

Area
  - Total: 5.36 km^{2} (2.07 sq mi)
- Elevation: 189 m (620 ft)

Population (2006-12-31)
  - Total: 1,915
  - Density: 357/km^{2} (925/sq mi)
- Time zone: UTC+01:00 (CET)
  - Summer (DST): UTC+02:00 (CEST)
- Postal codes: 06727
- Dialling codes: 03441
- Vehicle registration: BLK

Theißen (German pronunciation: [ˈtaɪ̯sn̩]) is a village and a former municipality in the Burgenlandkreis district, in Saxony-Anhalt, Germany. Since 1 January 2010, it is part of the town Zeitz.
