= Rudolf Drößler =

German author and science journalist

- Born: 18 May 1934; Zeitz, Germany
- Died: 23 November 2022 (aged 88)

Rudolf Drößler (18 May 1934 – 23 November 2022) was a German specialized book author and science-journalist.

== Life ==
Rudolf Drößler spent his childhood in the German city Zeitz, where he made his general qualification for university entrance in 1952. He studied Germanistics as well as Astronomy in Leipzig till 1956. After that he was teacher at the "Geschwister-Scholl"-school in Zeitz for several years.

Besides his job-related activities, he pursued archaeological and historical studies. During his complementary activities as memorial curator, he acquired a large amount of knowledge for his later activities and works.

After his first successful books, he became known as a freelance science journalist and specialized book author for astronomy, archeology and cultural history since 1975. In doing so he dealt critically with astrology and other pseudoscience.

Also he wrote some theater plays and other works of regional importance. In 1988 Rudolf Drößler published a biographical novel about the great Swiss archaeologist Otto Hauser, who was involved in the conflict between Germany and France in the time of World War I.

In addition he administers the "Wissenschaftliche Privatsammlung 'Otto Hauser'" together with Manuela Freyberg.

From 1991 till 1997, Rudolf Drößler was the town clerk for his home town, Zeitz.

== Works ==
- Wir beobachten den Himmel, 1963
- Die Venus der Eiszeit, 1967 ISBN B0000BQR9H
- Als die Sterne Götter waren, 1976 ISBN 3-404-64051-9
- Kunst der Eiszeit von Spanien bis Sibirien, 1980
- Brücken in die Vergangenheit, 1980 ISBN 3-332-00324-0
- Planeten, Tierkreiszeichen, Horoskope, 1984 ISBN 3-451-04139-1
- Kulturen aus der Vogelschau, 1987 ISBN 3-89340-001-X
- Flucht aus dem Paradies, 1988 ISBN 3-354-00168-2
- Astronomie in Stein, 1990 ISBN 3-926642-25-4
- Handlesen, Kartenschlagen, Pendeln (together with Manuela Freyberg), 1990 ISBN 3-451-04314-9
- Menschwerdung, 1993 ISBN 3-332-00511-1
- 2000 Jahre Weltuntergang, 1999 ISBN 3-429-02097-2

== Honors ==
- "Verdienstmedaille des Verdienstordens der Bundesrepublik Deutschland" for merits for town- and regional research 2002
