= Zeitz =

Town in Saxony-Anhalt, Germany

- Town
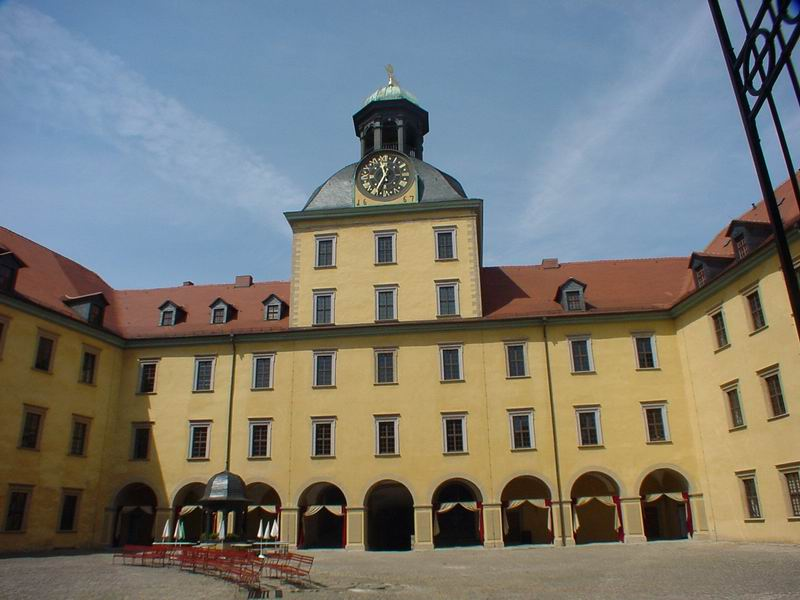
- Schloss Moritzburg

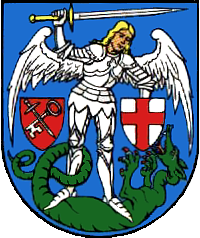
- Coat of arms

- Location of Zeitz within Burgenlandkreis district
- Interactive map of Zeitz
- Location within Germany Location within Saxony-Anhalt
- Coordinates: 51°2′52″N 12°8′18″E
- Country: Germany
- State: Saxony-Anhalt
- District: Burgenlandkreis

Government
  - Mayor (2023–30): Christian Thieme (CDU)

Area
  - Total: 87.18 km^{2} (33.66 sq mi)
- Elevation: 160 m (520 ft)

Population (2025-12-31)
  - Total: 27,934
  - Density: 320.4/km^{2} (829.9/sq mi)
- Time zone: UTC+01:00 (CET)
  - Summer (DST): UTC+02:00 (CEST)
- Postal codes: 06711, 06712
- Dialling codes: 03441, 034423, 034426
- Vehicle registration: BLK, HHM, NEB, NMB, WSF, ZZ
- Website: German: Stadt Zeitz

Zeitz (German pronunciation: [ˈtsaɪts]; Upper Sorbian: Žič, pronounced [ˈʒitʃ]) is a town in the Burgenlandkreis district, in Saxony-Anhalt, Germany. It is situated on the river White Elster, in the triangle of the federal states Saxony-Anhalt, Thuringia, and Saxony.

== History ==
First a Slavic pagan settlement later Christianized, Zeitz was first recorded under the Medieval Latin name Cici in the Synod of Ravenna in 967. The name "Zeitz" is believed to have Slavic origins, likely deriving from the Sorbian word "cica", meaning "water" or "stream," referring to the White Elster river that flows through the town. The suffix "-itz" is a common Slavic placename ending.

Between 965 and 982, it was the chief fortress of the March of Zeitz. Zeitz was a bishop's residence between 968 and 1028, when it was moved to Naumburg. Beginning at the end of the 13th century, the bishops again resided in their castle at Zeitz.

The city was captured by Swedish troops during the Thirty Years' War and was given to Electorate of Saxony in 1644. It was the centre of Saxe-Zeitz between 1657 and 1718, before returning to the Electorate (which became the Kingdom of Saxony in 1806).

In 1815, it was given to the Kingdom of Prussia, becoming district (kreis) centre of the Merseburg region (regierungsbezirk) of the Province of Saxony until 1944, when it became part of the Province of Halle-Merseburg. The Herrmannsschacht, built in 1889, is one of the oldest brown coal briquette factories in the world.

It became a county free city between 1901 and 1950. A bombing target of the Oil Campaign of World War II, the Brabag plant northeast of Zeitz used lignite coal for the production of synthetic fuels – forced labor was provided by the nearby Wille subcamp of Buchenwald in Rehmsdorf and Gleina. It was occupied by U.S. troops on 27 April 1945 and was transferred to Soviet control on 1 July 1945.

It was a district centre in the Halle region of Saxony-Anhalt state in 1945–1952 and again in 1990–1994, and in Bezirk Halle between 1952 and 1990. It lost its status as county centre and became part of the Burgenlandkreis on 1 July 1994.

In the middle of the 1960s work started on the "Zeitz-Ost" residential area, and in the mid-1980s, housing estates such as the "Völkerfreundschaft" (English: International Friendship) were built. On 18 August 1976, the Protestant clergyman Oskar Brüsewitz from Rippicha burnt himself to death in front of the Michaeliskirche. This was a protest against the DDR system.

The town was an industrial centre until German Reunification made many companies in eastern Germany uncompetitive, and 20,000 people lost jobs or moved to other employment. The town still has a large sugar factory, and the nearby lignite mines (Profen and Schleenhain) and Lippendorf Power Station, together employing 2,000 people from Zeitz.

On 1 July 2009 Zeitz absorbed the former municipalities Döbris, Geußnitz, Kayna, Nonnewitz and Würchwitz. On 1 January 2010 it absorbed Luckenau and Theißen.

== Geography ==
The town Zeitz consists of Zeitz proper and the following Ortschaften or municipal divisions:

- Geußnitz
- Kayna
- Luckenau
- Nonnewitz
- Pirkau
- Theißen
- Würchwitz
- Zangenberg

=== Climate ===
Zeitz has an oceanic climate (Köppen: Cfb; Trewartha: Dobk). The annual precipitation is 601.7 mm (23.69 in), and the precipitation in summer is about twice that in winter.

The Zeitz weather station has recorded the following extreme values:

- Highest Temperature 39.0 °C (102.2 °F) on 13 August 2003.
- Lowest Temperature −26.8 °C (−16.2 °F) on 14 January 1987.
- Wettest Year 880.5 mm (34.67 in) in 2002.
- Driest Year 302.5 mm (11.91 in) in 1982.
- Highest Daily Precipitation: 84.0 mm (3.31 in) on 21 July 1992.
- Earliest Snowfall: 14 October 2015.
- Latest Snowfall: 28 April 1985.

Climate data for Zeitz, 1991–2020 normals, extremes 1952–present
Month	Jan	Feb	Mar	Apr	May	Jun	Jul	Aug	Sep	Oct	Nov	Dec	Year
Record high °C (°F)	15.1 (59.2)	19.8 (67.6)	26.0 (78.8)	31.2 (88.2)	32.5 (90.5)	37.9 (100.2)	38.0 (100.4)	39.0 (102.2)	34.0 (93.2)	29.0 (84.2)	20.9 (69.6)	18.3 (64.9)	39.0 (102.2)
Mean maximum °C (°F)	11.2 (52.2)	13.3 (55.9)	18.3 (64.9)	23.6 (74.5)	27.8 (82.0)	31.1 (88.0)	32.9 (91.2)	33.0 (91.4)	27.5 (81.5)	22.3 (72.1)	15.3 (59.5)	11.7 (53.1)	35.0 (95.0)
Mean daily maximum °C (°F)	3.5 (38.3)	4.9 (40.8)	9.0 (48.2)	14.6 (58.3)	19.1 (66.4)	22.3 (72.1)	24.8 (76.6)	24.7 (76.5)	19.6 (67.3)	14.0 (57.2)	7.9 (46.2)	4.4 (39.9)	14.1 (57.4)
Daily mean °C (°F)	1.1 (34.0)	1.8 (35.2)	5.0 (41.0)	9.6 (49.3)	13.8 (56.8)	17.0 (62.6)	19.3 (66.7)	19.0 (66.2)	14.6 (58.3)	9.9 (49.8)	5.2 (41.4)	2.0 (35.6)	9.8 (49.6)
Mean daily minimum °C (°F)	−1.4 (29.5)	−1.0 (30.2)	1.5 (34.7)	4.8 (40.6)	8.6 (47.5)	12.0 (53.6)	14.1 (57.4)	14.0 (57.2)	10.4 (50.7)	6.6 (43.9)	2.7 (36.9)	−0.2 (31.6)	6.0 (42.8)
Mean minimum °C (°F)	−11.0 (12.2)	−9.1 (15.6)	−4.6 (23.7)	−1.4 (29.5)	2.7 (36.9)	6.8 (44.2)	9.4 (48.9)	8.7 (47.7)	4.9 (40.8)	−0.9 (30.4)	−3.8 (25.2)	−8.4 (16.9)	−13.0 (8.6)
Record low °C (°F)	−26.8 (−16.2)	−23.7 (−10.7)	−17.0 (1.4)	−7.0 (19.4)	−3.2 (26.2)	1.8 (35.2)	5.2 (41.4)	2.8 (37.0)	−1.6 (29.1)	−6.8 (19.8)	−13.0 (8.6)	−25.2 (−13.4)	−26.8 (−16.2)
Average precipitation mm (inches)	34.4 (1.35)	30.7 (1.21)	40.7 (1.60)	34.3 (1.35)	61.9 (2.44)	66.2 (2.61)	84.8 (3.34)	64.0 (2.52)	53.6 (2.11)	43.0 (1.69)	46.7 (1.84)	41.4 (1.63)	601.7 (23.69)
Average extreme snow depth cm (inches)	7.8 (3.1)	6.3 (2.5)	4.3 (1.7)	0.5 (0.2)	0 (0)	0 (0)	0 (0)	0 (0)	0 (0)	0.4 (0.2)	2.4 (0.9)	6.4 (2.5)	12.6 (5.0)
Average precipitation days (≥ 0.1 mm)	18.2	15.8	17.0	12.5	14.2	14.5	15.2	14.0	12.9	15.0	16.7	18.4	184.4
Average relative humidity (%)	81.2	78.6	74.2	68.3	69.5	70.1	68.3	68.8	75.0	80.1	83.7	82.9	75.0
Source: Deutscher Wetterdienst / SKlima.de

== Main sights ==
Zeitz's sights are predominantly situated along the Romanesque Road (point 52).

- Schloss Moritzburg, a baroque-style castle with the cathedral of St. Peter and Paul. The 10th-century crypt displays 17th-century tin coffins including that of Maurice, Duke of Saxe-Zeitz.
- Michaeliskirche (1154), originally a Romanesque basilica and contains a 1517 original of Martin Luther's 95 Theses.
- Town Hall (1509, rebuilt in 1909). It is a Gothic structure that, together with restored houses and three marketplaces, provides Zeitz's medieval appearance.
- Herrmannsschacht, a technical monument in a former brick factory.

== Twin towns – sister cities ==
Zeitz is twinned with:

- Darkhan, Mongolia (1989)
- Detmold, Germany (1990)
- Kaliningrad, Russia (1995)
- Tosu, Japan (1998)
- Prescott, United States (2014)

== Notable people ==
- Christian August of Saxe-Zeitz (1666–1725), Archbishop of Esztergom
- Anna Magdalena Bach (1701–1760), second wife of J. S. Bach
- Clemens Denhardt (1852–1929), Africa explorer
- Gustav Denhardt (1856–1917), African explorer
- Kurt Floericke (1869–1934), natural scientist, naturalist and author
- Ewald André Dupont (1891–1956), film director and screenwriter
- Walter Krüger (1892-1973), general
- Heinrich Troeger (1901–1975), jurist and SPD politician
- Ewald Riebschläger (1904–1993), water jumper, European Champion
- Karl Walther (1905–1981), painter
- Gotthard Handrick (1908–1978), fighter pilot and athlete, Olympic champion
- Fritz Gödicke (1919–2009), football coach
- Horst Wende (1919–1996), bandleader, arranger and composer
- Heinz-Günther Lehmann (1923–2006), swimmer, European champion
- Manfred Kaiser (1929–2017), footballer and coach
- Rudolf Drößler (1934 – 2022), author and science journalist
- Bernd Bauchspiess (born 1939), footballer
- Hans Zierold (born 1938), swimmer
- Klaus Trummer (born 1945), canoeist
- Jürgen Kretschmer (born 1947), canoeist
- Martina Falke (born 1951), canoeist

== See also ==
- Geußnitz
