= Melhania velutina =

Scientific classification
- Kingdom: Plantae
- Clade: Tracheophytes
- Clade: Angiosperms
- Clade: Eudicots
- Clade: Rosids
- Order: Malvales
- Family: Malvaceae
- Genus: Melhania
- Species: M. velutina

Binomial name
- Melhania velutina Forssk.

Synonyms
- Dombeya velutina (Forssk.) Willd.; Melhania ferruginea A.Rich.; Melhania malacochlamys K.Schum.; Pentapetes velutina (Forssk.) Vahl

Species of plant

Melhania velutina is a plant in the family Malvaceae, native to Africa and the Arabian Peninsula.

== Description ==
Melhania velutina grows as a herb or subshrub up to 1 metre (3 ft) tall, rarely to 2.5 m (8 ft). The ovate leaves are tomentose above and measure up to 13 cm (5 in) long. Inflorescences have a solitary flower or two to four-flowered cymes, on a stalk up to 8.5 cm (3 in) long. The flowers have yellow petals. The fruits are ovoid and measure up to 1 cm (0.4 in) long.

== Distribution and habitat ==
Melhania velutina is native to an area from Angola northeast to Sudan and east to Somalia. It is also native to Saudi Arabia and Yemen. Its habitat is in woodland, grassland, riverside forests and agricultural land, typically at elevations of 700–1,950 m (2,300–6,400 ft).
