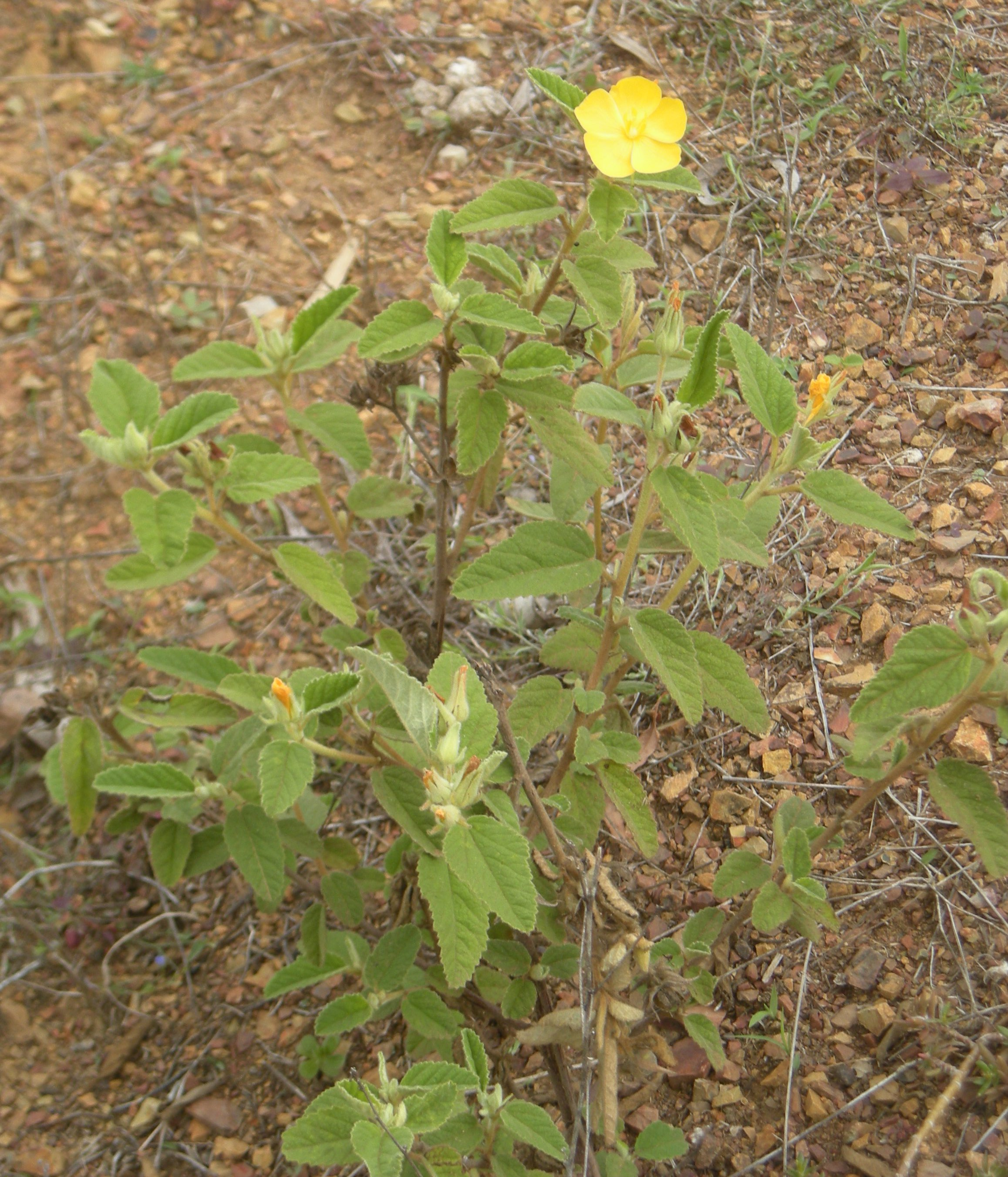
- Melhania oblongifolia

Scientific classification
- Kingdom: Plantae
- Clade: Embryophytes
- Clade: Tracheophytes
- Clade: Spermatophytes
- Clade: Angiosperms
- Clade: Eudicots
- Clade: Rosids
- Order: Malvales
- Family: Malvaceae
- Subfamily: Dombeyoideae
- Genus: Melhania; Forssk.

Synonyms
- Brotera Cav.; Cardiostegia C.Presl; Paramelhania Arènes; Pentaglottis Wall.; Sprengelia Schult. nom. illeg.; Trochetiopsis Marais; Vialia Vis.

= Melhania =

Genus of flowering plants

Melhania is a genus of small shrubs or herbaceous plants. Traditionally included in the family Sterculiaceae, it is included in the expanded Malvaceae in the APG and most subsequent systematics. The genus is named for Mount Melhan in Yemen.

A 2021 study subsumed Trochetiopsis, which included several species endemic to Saint Helena, and Paramelhania, native to Madagascar, into Melhania. There is evidence from fossil pollen that the Trochetiopsis lineage has been on Saint Helena since the late Miocene (some 9.5 million years).

== Species ==
The following species are recognised by Plants of the World Online (POWO):

- Melhania acuminata Mast. Angola, Zambia, and Mozambique to South Africa
- Melhania albiflora (Hiern) Exell & Mendonça – southwestern Angola
- Melhania ambovombeensis Arènes – Madagascar
- Melhania andrahomanensis Arènes – Madagascar
- Melhania angustifolia K.Schum. – Tanzania (Zanzibar)
- Melhania annua Thulin – central and southern Somalia to southeastern Kenya
- Melhania apiculata Baker f. – Madagascar
- Melhania beguinotii Cufod. – southern Ethiopia
- Melhania × benjaminii (Cronk) Dorr – Saint Helena
- Melhania brachycarpa Domin – northeastern Queensland
- Melhania burchellii DC. – western Zimbabwe to Namibia and South Africa
- Melhania cannabina Wight ex Mast. – southern India (Karnataka and Tamil Nadu
- Melhania carrissoi Exell & Mendonça – southwestern Angola
- Melhania corchoriflora Baill. – Madagascar
- Melhania coriacea Chiov. – central and southern Somalia
- Melhania damarana Harv. – Namibia, Botswana, and Northern Cape Province
- Melhania decaryana Arènes Madagascar
- Melhania dehnhardtii K.Schum. – southeastern Kenya
- Melhania denhamii R.Br. – northern tropical Africa (Mauritania to Somalia), Yemen, Pakistan, and northwestern India
- Melhania didyma Eckl. & Zeyh. South Africa, Botswana, and Eswatini
- Melhania ebenus (Cronk) Dorr – north-central and western Saint Helena
- Melhania engleriana K.Schum. – northern Somalia
- Melhania erythroxylon (G.Forst.) R.Br. – central Saint Helena
- Melhania fiherenanensis Arènes - Madagascar
- Melhania forbesii Planch. ex Mast. – southern tropical Africa (Angola to Mozambique, Namibia, and Kwazulu Natal)
- Melhania fruticosa Arènes – Madagascar
- Melhania futteyporensis Munro ex Mast. – Pakistan to central India
- Melhania hamiltoniana Wall. – India, Myanmar, and southern China (Yunnan)
- Melhania hiranensis Thulin – central Somalia
- Melhania humbertii Arènes – Madagascar
- Melhania incana B.Heyne ex Wight & Arn. – southwestern Arabian Peninsula, Socotra, Somalia, and southern India
- Melhania integra I.Verd. – South Africa (Northern Province)
- Melhania itampoloensis (Hochr.) Arènes – Madagascar
- Melhania jaberi Abedin – Saudi Arabia
- Melhania javanica Adelb. – eastern Java to Lesser Sunda Islands (Timor)
- Melhania kelleri Schinz eastern Ethiopia and Somalia
- Melhania latibracteolata Dorr – Ethiopia, Somalia, and northern Kenya
- Melhania lisae Dorr – Madagascar
- Melhania magnifolia Blatt. & Hallb. – northwestern India
- Melhania mananarensis Arènes – Madagascar
- Melhania melanoxylon (Sol. ex Sims) R.Br. – northern Saint Helena
- Melhania menafe Arènes – Madagascar
- Melhania minutissima Hochr. – Madagascar
- Melhania muricata Balf.f. – northeastern Kenya, Somalia, Socotra, and southern Arabian Peninsula
- Melhania oblongifolia F.Muell. – Australia and southeastern New Guinea
- Melhania orbicularidentata Arènes – Madagascar
- Melhania ovata (Cav.) Spreng. – Cape Verde and northern tropical Africa (Mauritania to Tanzania), Arabian Peninsula, southern Pakistan, and southern India
- Melhania parviflora Chiov. – Ethiopia to Tanzania
- Melhania perrieri Hochr. – Madagascar
- Melhania phillipsiae Baker f. – Niger to Sudan and Kenya, Arabian Peninsula
- Melhania poissonii Arènes – Madagascar
- Melhania polygama I.Verd. – Kwazulu Natal
- Melhania polyneura K.Schum. – northwestern Tanzania
- Melhania praemorsa Dorr – Ethiopia, Somalia, and Northern Kenya
- Melhania prostrata Burch. – Mozambique, Zimbabwe, Botswana, and South Africa
- Melhania quercifolia Thulin – Central and southern Somalia
- Melhania randii Baker f. – southwestern Tanzania to Eswatini
- Melhania rehmannii Szyszył. – Mozambique to Namibia and South Africa
- Melhania rotundata Hochst. ex Mast. – Ethiopia, Somalia, Kenya, and northeastern Tanzania
- Melhania sidoides (Wight & Arn.) Noltie India (Tamil Nadu)
- Melhania somalensis Baker f. – southeastern Ethiopia
- Melhania spathulata Arènes – Madagascar
- Melhania steudneri Schweinf. – Northeastern tropical Africa (Sudan to Somalia)
- Melhania stipulosa J.R.I.Wood – Ethiopia, Somalia, Djibouti, Yemen, and Saudi Arabia
- Melhania substricta Dorr – Kenya, Somalia, Ethiopia, Eritrea, and Yemen
- Melhania suluensis Gerstner – South Africa (Mpumalunga and Kwazulu Natal) and Eswatini
- Melhania transvaalensis Szyszył. – South Africa (Northern Province)
- Melhania tulearensis Arènes – Madagascar
- Melhania velutina Forssk. – Angola to Malawi and Sudan, southwestern Arabian Peninsula
- Melhania virescens K.Schum. Namibia, Botswana, and South Africa (Northern Cape and northern Province)
- Melhania vohipalensis Arènes – Madagascar
- Melhania volleseniana Dorr – Ethiopia, Somalia, and Kenya
- Melhania zavattarii Cufod. – eastern and southern Ethiopia

=== Formerly placed here ===
Melhania decanthera (Cav.) DC and M. laurifolia Bojer are now in Dombeya (as D. decanthera and D. laurifolia).
