= Clemens Denhardt =

German explorer (1852–1928)

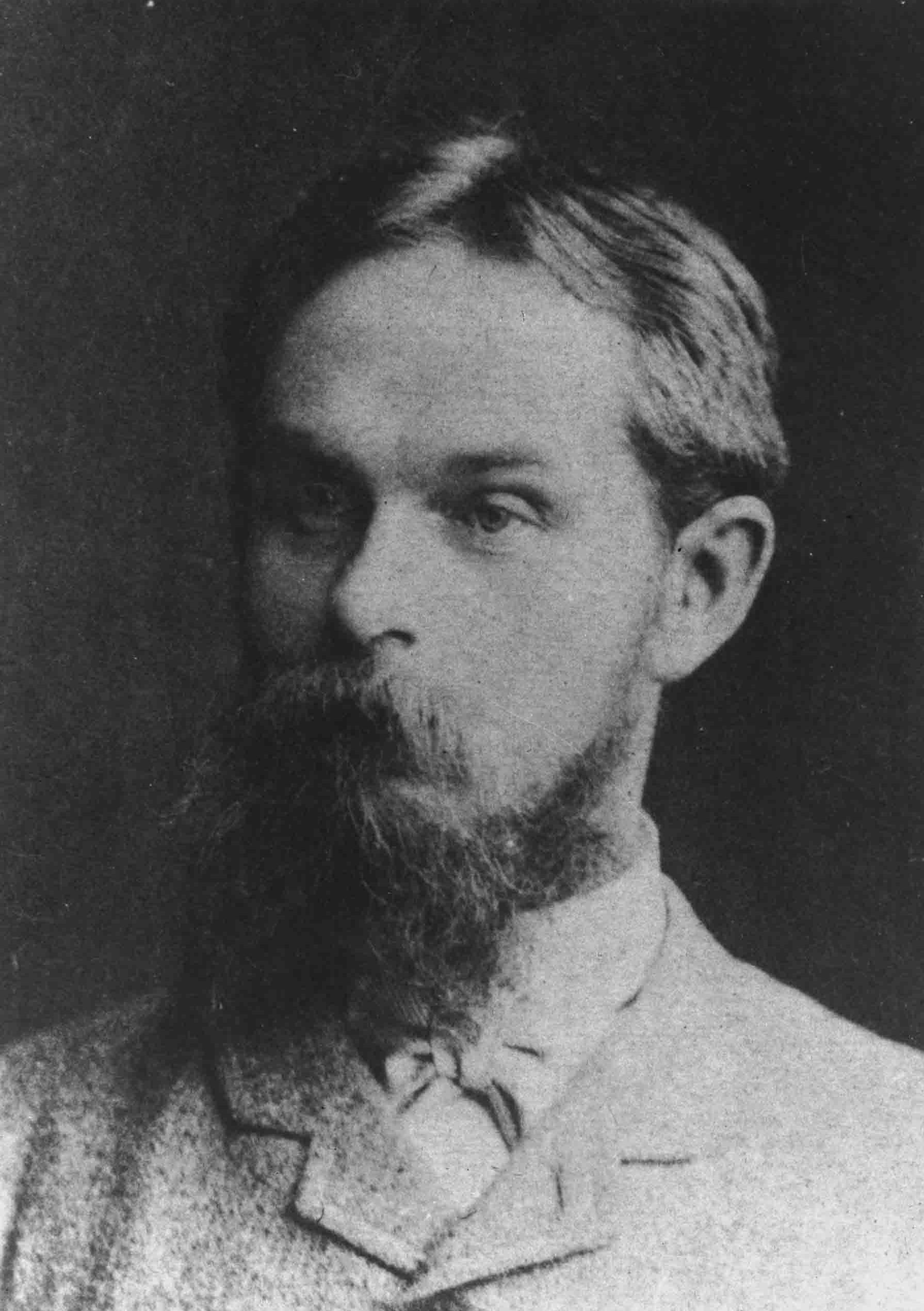
Clemens Denhardt

Clemens Andreas Denhardt (1852–1928) and his brother Gustav Denhardt (1856–1917), born in Zeitz, Province of Saxony, were distinguished German explorers of Africa at the time of the Scramble for Africa. In association with the physician G. A. Fischer they undertook in 1878 a tour through the Tana River region, East Africa, which they endeavored to secure to German commerce. Six years later they entered upon a second expedition, extending from the island Lamu to Vitu (March 1885), where the Sultan of the Swahili requested the establishment of a friendly treaty with Germany based upon proposals made by him 18 years previously. Part of the territory acquired by Clemens Denhardt was afterward transferred by him to the German colonial society known as the Deutsche Witugesellschaft. In 1890 all rights to this territory were ceded by Germany to England in exchange for Helgoland, the German government compensating the brothers with an indemnity of 150,000 Goldmark. An important work by Clemens Denhardt was published in 1883 in the Mitteilungen des Vereins für Erdkunde at Leipzig under the title, Anleitung zu geographischen Arbeiten bei Forschungsreisen.
