= Northern Provinces =

South African biogeographical area

WGSRPD areas of South Africa; TVL = Northern Provinces

The Northern Provinces of South Africa is a biogeographical area used in the World Geographical Scheme for Recording Plant Distributions (WGSRPD). It is part of the WGSRPD region 27 Southern Africa. The area has the code "TVL". It includes the South African provinces of Gauteng, Mpumalanga, Limpopo (Northern Province) and North West, together making up an area slightly larger than the former Transvaal Province.

WGSRPD codes

27 Southern Africa

- TVL Northern Provinces
  - TVL-GA Gauteng
  - TVL-MP Mpumalanga
  - TVL-NP Northern Province (Limpopo)
  - TVL-NW North West Province

== See also ==
- Category:Flora of the Northern Provinces
- Cape Provinces

== Bibliography ==
- Brummitt, R.K. (2001). World Geographical Scheme for Recording Plant Distributions: Edition 2 (PDF). International Working Group on Taxonomic Databases For Plant Sciences (TDWG).
