= Rosh Pina Stream =

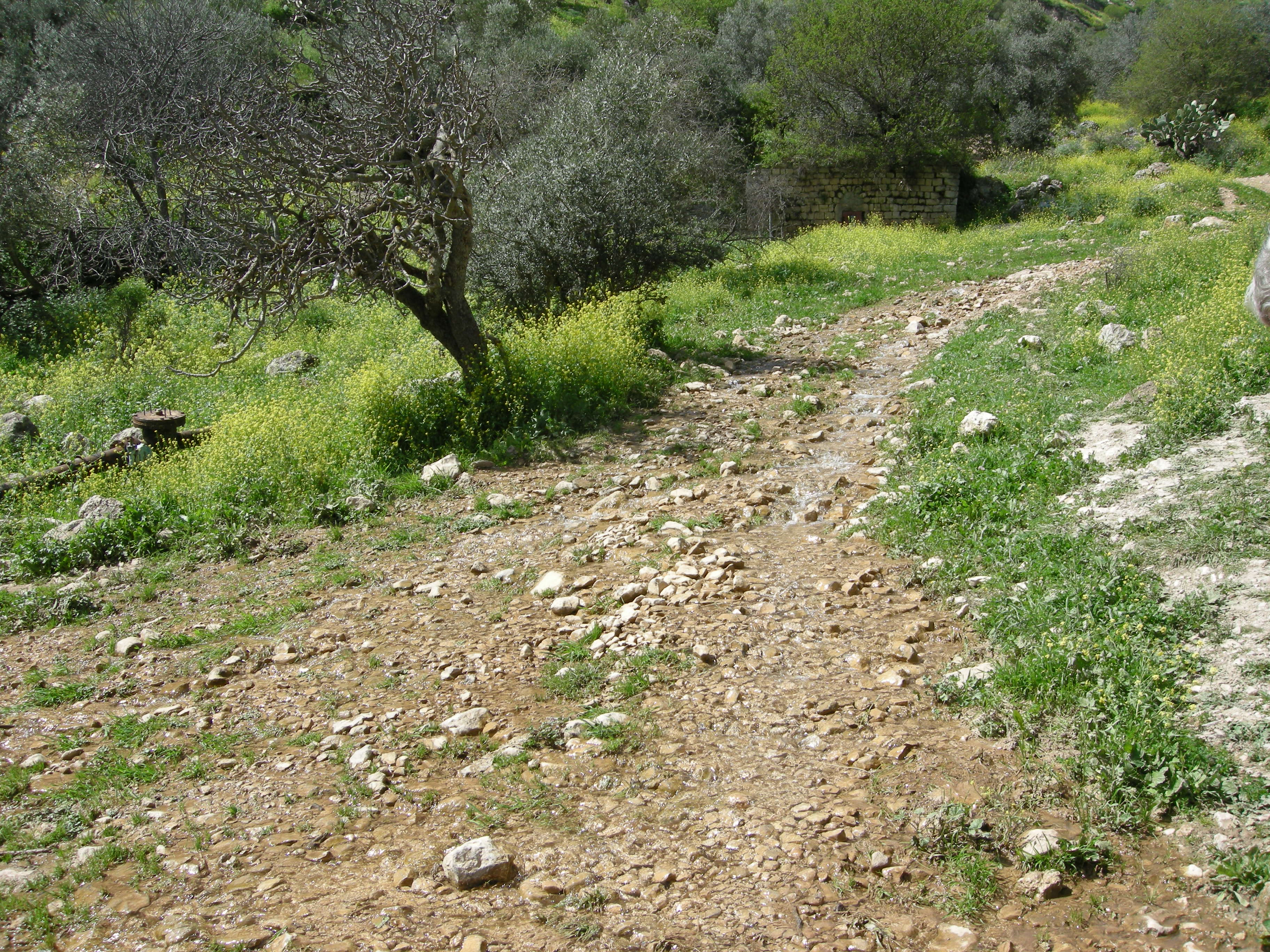

Location
- State: Israel
- Region: Upper Galilee

Physical characteristics
- Mouth
  - coordinates: 32°59′51″N 35°37′30″E

Rosh Pina Stream (Hebrew: נחל ראש פינה, Nahal Rosh Pina (Note: Romanized Nahal Rosh Pina (lit. 'Rosh Pina Stream'), Rosh Pina being the name of the nearby village; that settlement takes its name, ראש פינה 'cornerstone', from Psalm 118:22, where is it used symbolically.)) is a stream in the Upper Galilee that drains the eastern slopes of Mount Canaan. It originates on Mount Canaan, descends through the settlement of Rosh Pinna, and flows into the Jordan River. Along the stream, three springs emerge: Ein Gey-Onni, Ein Pina, and Ein Kadan. The upper part of the stream is a declared nature reserve covering an area of 273 dunams (2,730 m^{2}; 0.67 acres), designated on July 31, 2007.

== Geography ==
Rosh Pina Stream flows down the eastern slopes of Mount Canaan, from west to east, and drains two steep valleys. These valleys start from the area of Kiryat Sarah neighborhood in Safed and converge about 200 meters (660 ft) above Ein Gey-Onni. From there, the stream channel flows through the three springs and through Rosh Pinna to the Jordan River. The stream's length from Safed to the Jordan is about 13.2 kilometers (8.2 mi).

In the section between Mount Canaan and Rosh Pina, the stream descends relatively steeply, at about 400 meters (1,300 ft) over about two kilometers (1.2 mi). Despite the elevation differences, no waterfalls or overly steep slopes formed, allowing a road to be paved along the stream. This road, which connected Safed to Tiberias via Rosh Pina, was mostly paved with stones, but jeeps and ATVs that traveled freely in the 1990s and early 2000s (until 2007) severely damaged the road, creating deep ruts in some parts that diverted the stream's flow onto the road. Due to the road's steep and challenging nature, the Rosh Pina-Safed road (now Route 8900) was paved during World War I, providing a more moderate slope between Tiberias, Rosh Pina, and Safed. Short sections of the old stone-paved road still exist today.

In Rosh Pina, the stream passes through the upper part of the settlement, reaches the old commercial center, enters an 80-meter-long (260 ft) canal, emerges for 30 meters (98 ft), and then enters another canal about 120 meters (390 ft) long. Afterward, the stream flows again through an open channel, passing through the Shkedim neighborhood (Expansion B). The stream exits the neighborhood near one of the houses in the northern part and continues through a field towards the Refkor cooling house, crossing Route 90 in a canal under the road. The stream continues near Mahanaim airfield and reaches a water reservoir northwest of Kfar HaNassi, where the water is stored, and only the excess flows down the stream to the Jordan River. The lower part of the stream is known by its Arabic name: Wadi Shu'ayun, and it flows into the Jordan near Metzudat Ateret.

The upper part of the stream between Safed and Rosh Pina, about 1.3 kilometers (0.81 mi) long, is divided into two parts: the lower part, within the jurisdiction of the Rosh Pina local council, on Israel Land Administration land, was officially declared a nature reserve in the summer of 2007, covering 273 dunams (2,730 m^{2}; 0.67 acres). The upper part, covering 863 dunams (8,630 m^{2}; 2.13 acres), is within the jurisdiction of Safed municipality, includes many private lands, and its designation as a reserve is pending approval.

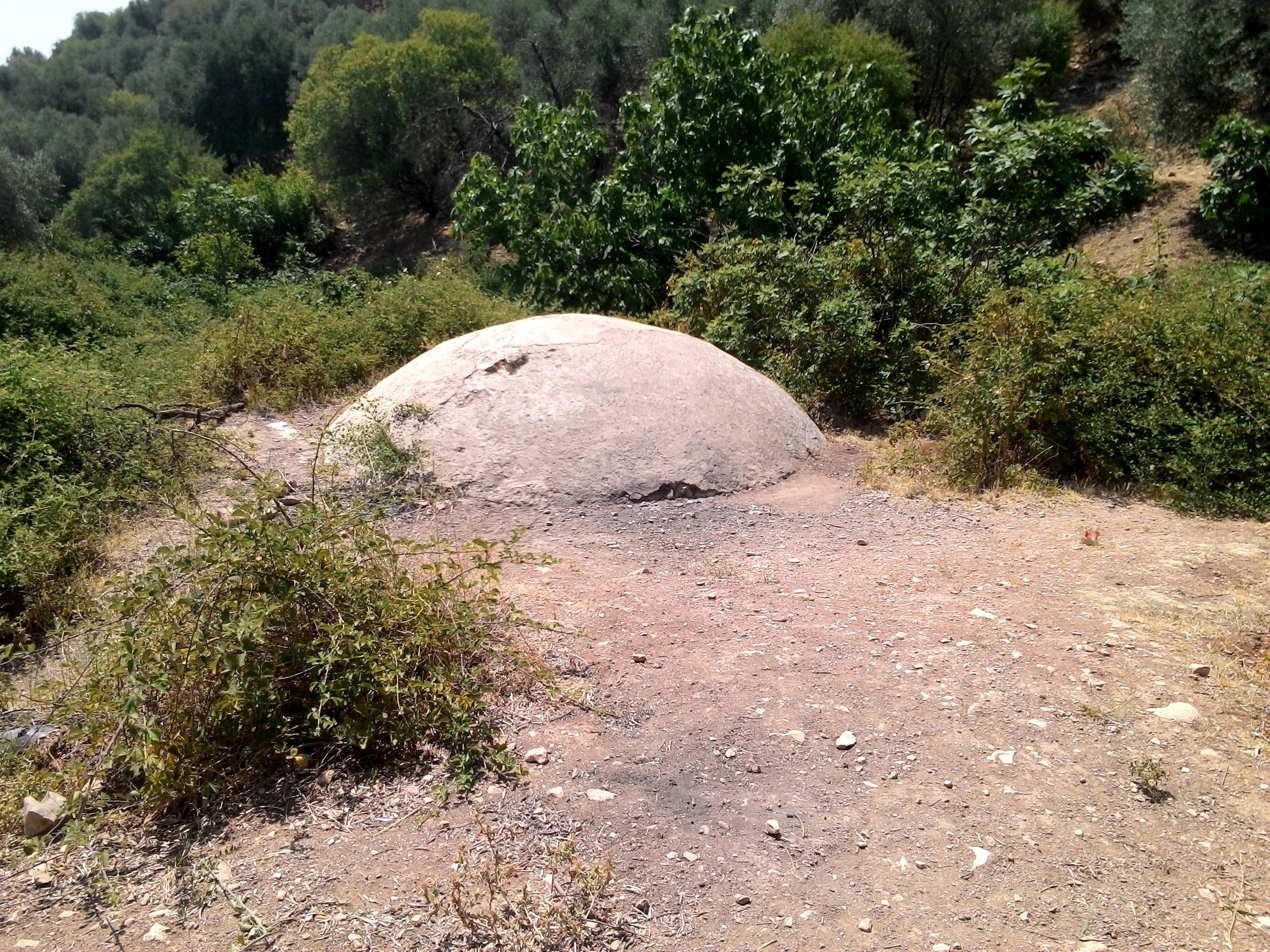
Ein Kadan

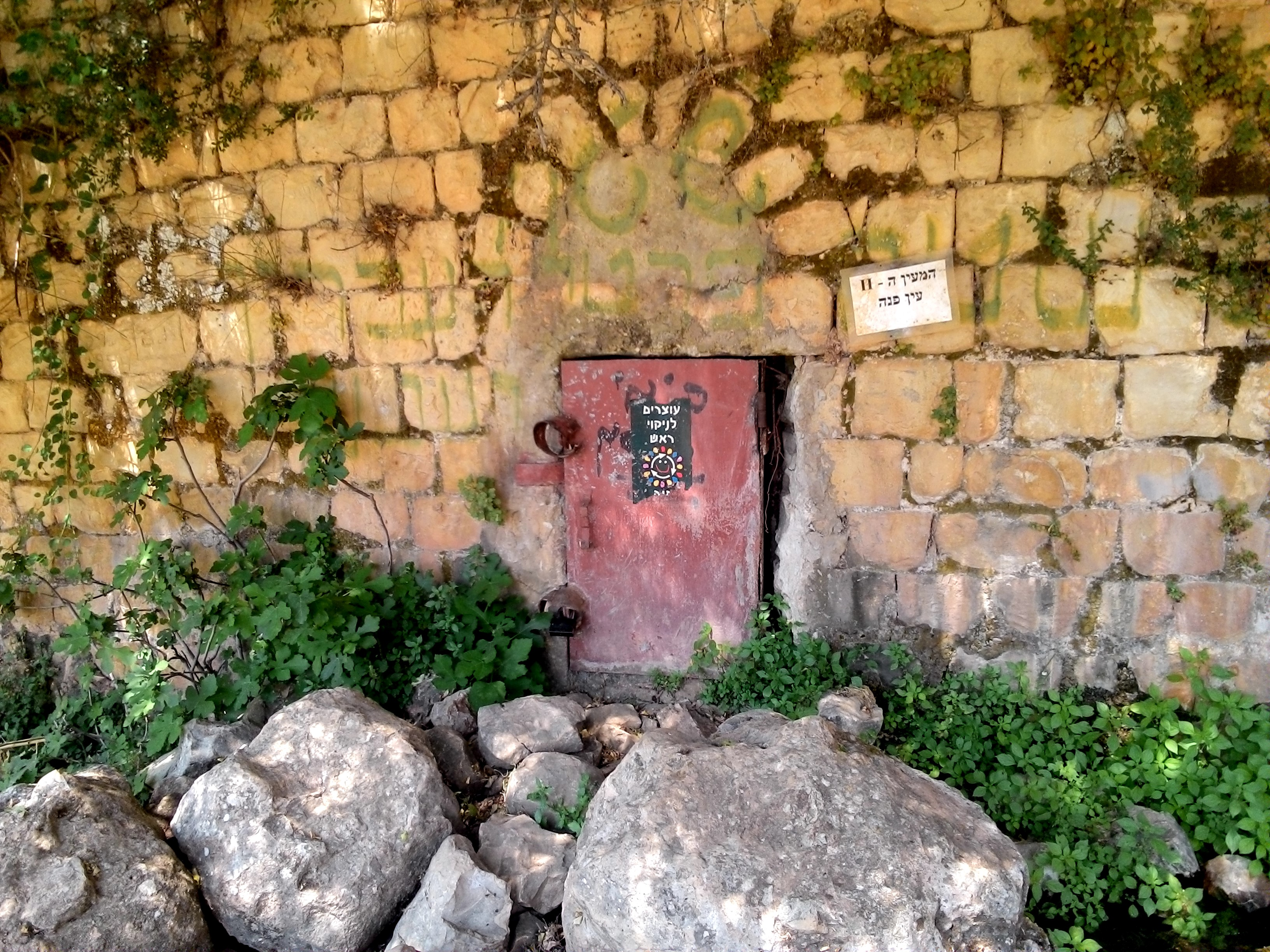
Ein Pina

== Hydrology ==
=== Springs ===
Along the stream, three springs emerge: Ein Gey-Onni, Ein Pina, and Ein Kadan. As of 2014, most of the spring water is utilized, and stone structures built around them still exist.

In the stream, three springs all emerge within ancient enclosed structures built to protect the water from contamination. Some of the spring water flows by gravity into the settlement, with the excess flowing outside the springs, although in recent years, less water has been directed to the settlement, allowing the stream to flow year-round. The first (lower) spring is called Ein Kadan. About 300 meters (980 ft) above it is Ein Pina, with some of its water captured and piped by gravity to the upper part of the settlement. Ein Gey-Onni, the third spring, is about 300 meters (980 ft) above Ein Pina.

=== Water use ===
Animals living in the stream's drainage basin come to drink, especially important during the summer months. For humans, this water served as a life source for the residents of Al-Ja'una (or Jaouni) and Rosh Pinna. In the first two decades of the 21st century, the population increased from about 2,200–2,300 to between 3,000 and 3,400, and desalination facilities were built along the coastal plain; thus, the settlement receives additional water from other sources. This situation allowed for reduced water extraction, enabling the stream to flow year-round. Despite an agreement between the Israel Nature and Parks Authority and the Rosh Pina local council to release the water to nature, the Rosh Pina council still extracts water from the stream. During summer, about 200–250 cubic meters (260–330 cu yd) per day are extracted, and in rainy seasons, it reaches 500–600 m^{3} (650–780 cu yd) per day. On average, about 300–350 m^{3} (390–460 cu yd) per day are extracted annually. The water is transported by gravity to the upper part of the settlement, filtered, and supplied as drinking water to the upper neighborhoods.

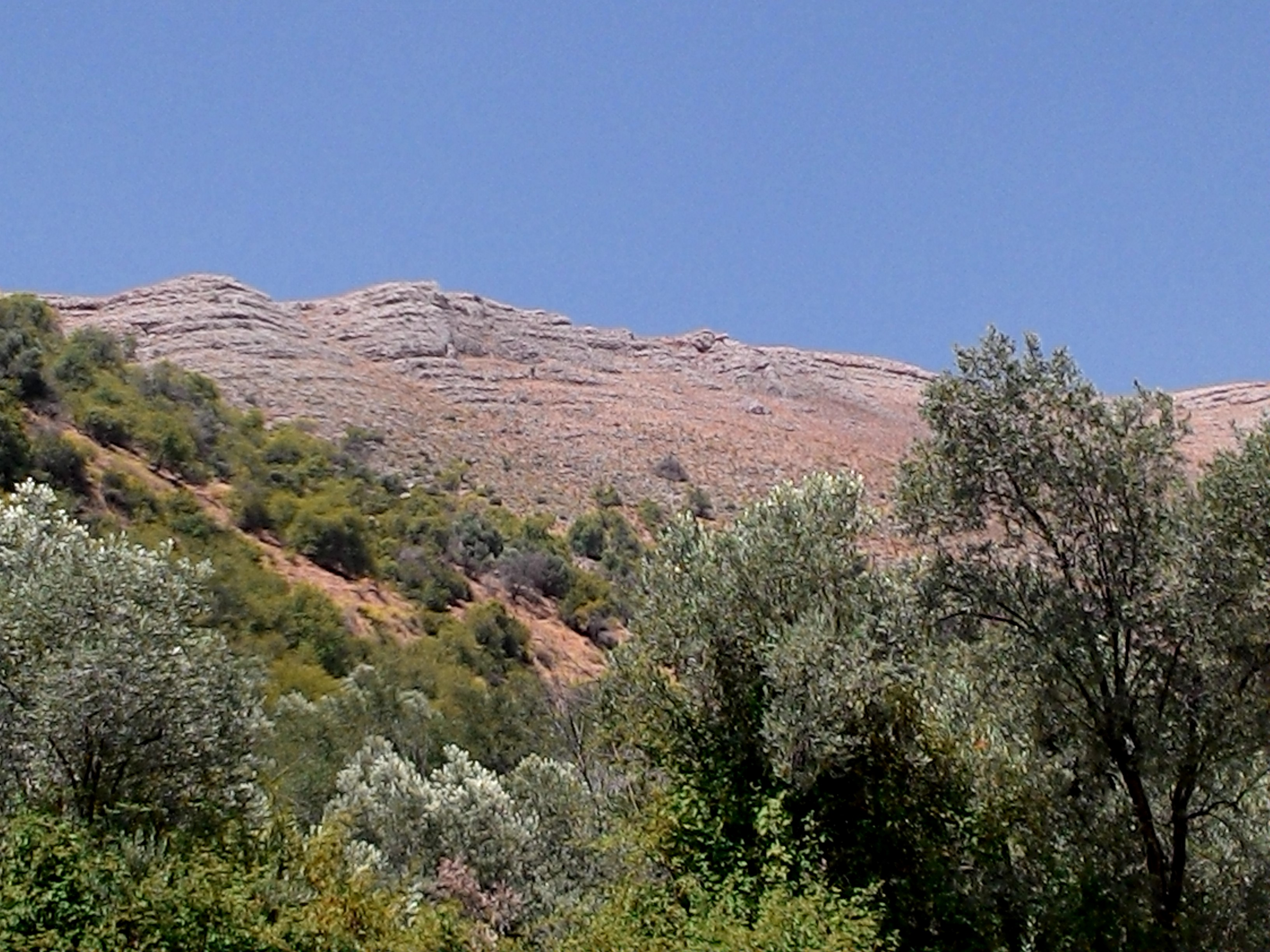

== Geology and soil ==
Looking up towards Mount Canaan, one notices the absence of trees, as Rosh Pina Stream cuts through Mount Canaan, primarily composed of hard limestone from the Middle Eocene. The upper part of the stream features large rock formations from the Bar Kokhba formation, creating steep cliffs. The soil developing on the Eocene rocks contains clay, becoming muddy when wet and shrinking and crumbling when dry.

== Vegetation ==
Three main habitats are found along the Rosh Pina Stream: mountain slope, orchard plants, and stream vegetation.

=== Stream vegetation ===
Interestingly, common stream plants like reeds, willows, and oleanders do not grow along Rosh Pina Stream, with no clear explanation for this phenomenon. A similar situation occurs in two other streams in the Western Galilee: Nahal Betzet is abundant with oleanders, while nearby Kziv Stream lacks them. Water plants found in the stream include the holy bramble, water speedwell, purple loosestrife, watercress, and fig (Ficus carica).

Most stream plants bloom in summer, with the advantage of available water allowing exclusive flowering during this season, benefiting from pollinating insects and extending growth periods until summer.

=== Orchard plants ===
Near Rosh Pina, the stream's banks are wide, allowing orchard trees to grow from the mountain slopes close to the stream. These trees were planted by the Arab village residents of Al-Ja'una before the settlement of Rosh Pina. Most orchard trees are fruit trees: almond, cactus, pomegranate, and olive, with some natural trees like the Palestine buckthorn and azerole hawthorn. In shaded areas, mainly on the northern slope, rocks are covered with moss.

=== Mountain slope vegetation ===
The slopes of Rosh Pina Stream are composed of Eocene limestone. The soil developing on these rocks contains clays that absorb little water, causing it to dry quickly. Therefore, forest and woodland plants, as expected in high rainfall areas, are absent. The main vegetation communities are herbaceous plants, prominently wild emmer wheat (Triticum dicoccoides), wild barley (Hordeum spontaneum), bulbous barley, yellow asphodel, and Asphodelus ramosus. One can also find annuals like mustard, Lavatera cretica, Campanula macrostachya (Note: See Campanula macrostachya at Wikispecies.), and Anagallis arvensis on the slopes.

In the upper part of the stream, on the northern bank, there are concentrations of Sternbergia clusiana blooming from mid-November to early December, while in the lower part of the stream, on the southern bank, there are concentrations of Fritillaria persica blooming.

=== Discovery of ancestral wild wheat ===
In April 2007, about a hundred wheat researchers gathered in Rosh Pina for an international conference on genetic wheat research, marking 100 years since the discovery of wild wheat by Aaron Aaronsohn. On June 18, 1906, the source of cultivated wheat was first discovered, about 9,000 years after wheat became an agricultural crop.

Wheat is one of the three most important cereal grains for food. The discovery of ancient wild emmer wheat in the Rosh Pina Stream valley by Aaron Aaronsohn brought him and the place worldwide recognition.

== Wildlife ==
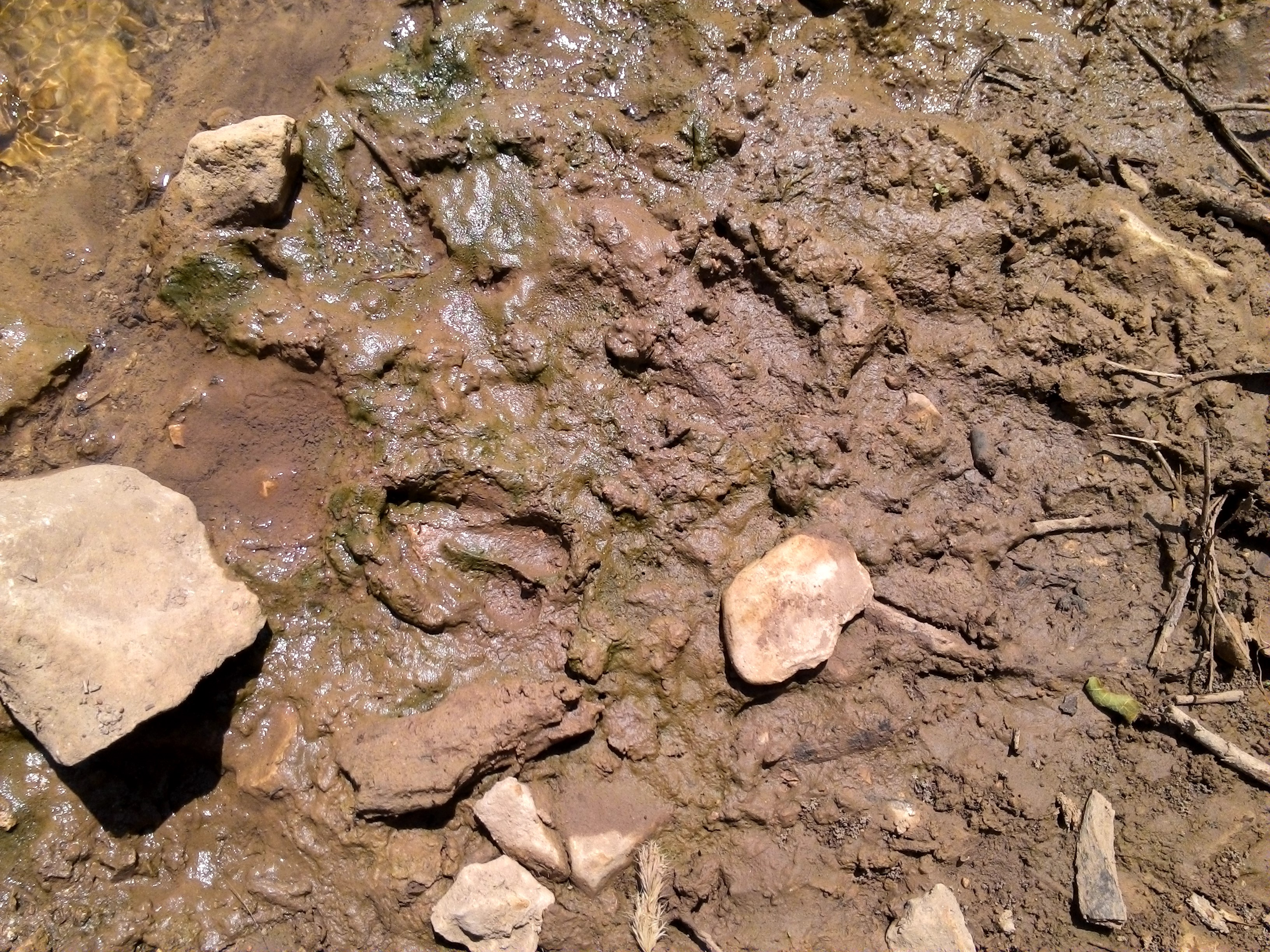
Wild boar tracks

Nahal Rosh Pina is rich in wildlife found in different habitats. The stream's three springs allow aquatic animals to thrive. In the winter, the unique amphibian fire salamander can be found near the springs.

The stream also hosts water and semi-aquatic animals like water striders and shore bugs. Near the stream, animals such as the Israeli gazelle, wild boar, tortoise, and porcupine come to drink. Recently, gray wolves have also reached the Rosh Pina Stream, spreading from the Golan to Galilee. These wolves are monitored to prevent their population from growing excessively and harming endangered species. The stream's banks and surroundings also host a variety of arthropods and insects, such as spiders and Cymbalophora oertzeni, a tiger moth species known locally as the 'spotted teddy bear' (he:דובון מנומר) moth.

The stream's cliffs provide a habitat for animals like rock hyraxes and birds of prey. Nahal Rosh Pina is a nature reserve where hunting is strictly prohibited.

== Nature conservation ==
The upper part of Nahal Rosh Pina from Safed to the town of Rosh Pina was declared a nature reserve in 2007 to preserve an ecological corridor free from human influence, connecting natural habitats and allowing animals to safely cross human-made obstacles such as roads, canals, and railways. According to the Israel Nature and Parks Authority, starting March 15, 2014, the springs Ein Kadan, Ein Pina, and Ein Guy Onni will release water into the stream year-round to rehabilitate the stream's habitats. Additionally, an extension of the reserve covering 1,136 dunams (11,360 m^{2}; 2.81 acres) is proposed.

Alongside the partial release of spring water, the hiking trail through the stream from Mount Canaan to Safed was closed to off-road vehicles and is now designated for hikers only. However, in the early 2000s, a high-voltage power line was stretched over the wadi, often emitting loud noises. These noises can also be heard within the settlement. Over the years, likely due to this reason (though not proven beyond doubt), the number of gazelles in the wadi area has decreased, and they are now only seen on the surrounding slopes.
