= Cymbalophora rivularis =

Scientific classification
- Domain: Eukaryota
- Kingdom: Animalia
- Phylum: Arthropoda
- Class: Insecta
- Order: Lepidoptera
- Superfamily: Noctuoidea
- Family: Erebidae
- Subfamily: Arctiinae
- Genus: Cymbalophora
- Species: C. rivularis

Binomial name
- Cymbalophora rivularis (Ménétries, 1832)

Synonyms
- Chelonia rivularis Ménétries, 1832; Euprepia rivularis; Euprepia rivularis dannehli Turati in Dannehl, 1928; Euprepia rivularis perversa Turati in Dannehl, 1928

Species of moth

Cymbalophora rivularis is a moth of the family Erebidae first described by Édouard Ménétries in 1832. It is found in central Italy, the Balkan Peninsula, western Iran, Dagestan, Armenia and western Azerbaijan.

These species can be easily distinguished as C. rivularis because they are smaller and have a yellowish abdomen, and exhibits three black spots on the inferior margin of their forewings. Furthermore, the female is brachypterous, whilst the female of the congeneric species, Cymbalophora pudica, is fully winged.

The wingspan of the male is 20–30 mm.

The larvae feed on Taraxacum and Plantago species.

== Similar species ==
- Chelis maculosa
- Cymbalophora pudica

== Primary host-plants ==
Family	Latin name	Vernacular name
Asteraceae	Taraxacum	Dandelion
Plantaginaceae	Plantago	Plantain
