= Cymbalophora haroldi =

Scientific classification
- Domain: Eukaryota
- Kingdom: Animalia
- Phylum: Arthropoda
- Class: Insecta
- Order: Lepidoptera
- Superfamily: Noctuoidea
- Family: Erebidae
- Subfamily: Arctiinae
- Genus: Cymbalophora
- Species: C. haroldi

Binomial name
- Cymbalophora haroldi (Oberthür, 1911)

Synonyms
- Chelonia haroldi Oberthür, 1911

Species of moth

Cymbalophora haroldi is a moth of the family Erebidae first described by Charles Oberthür in 1911. It is found in Morocco and Algeria.
