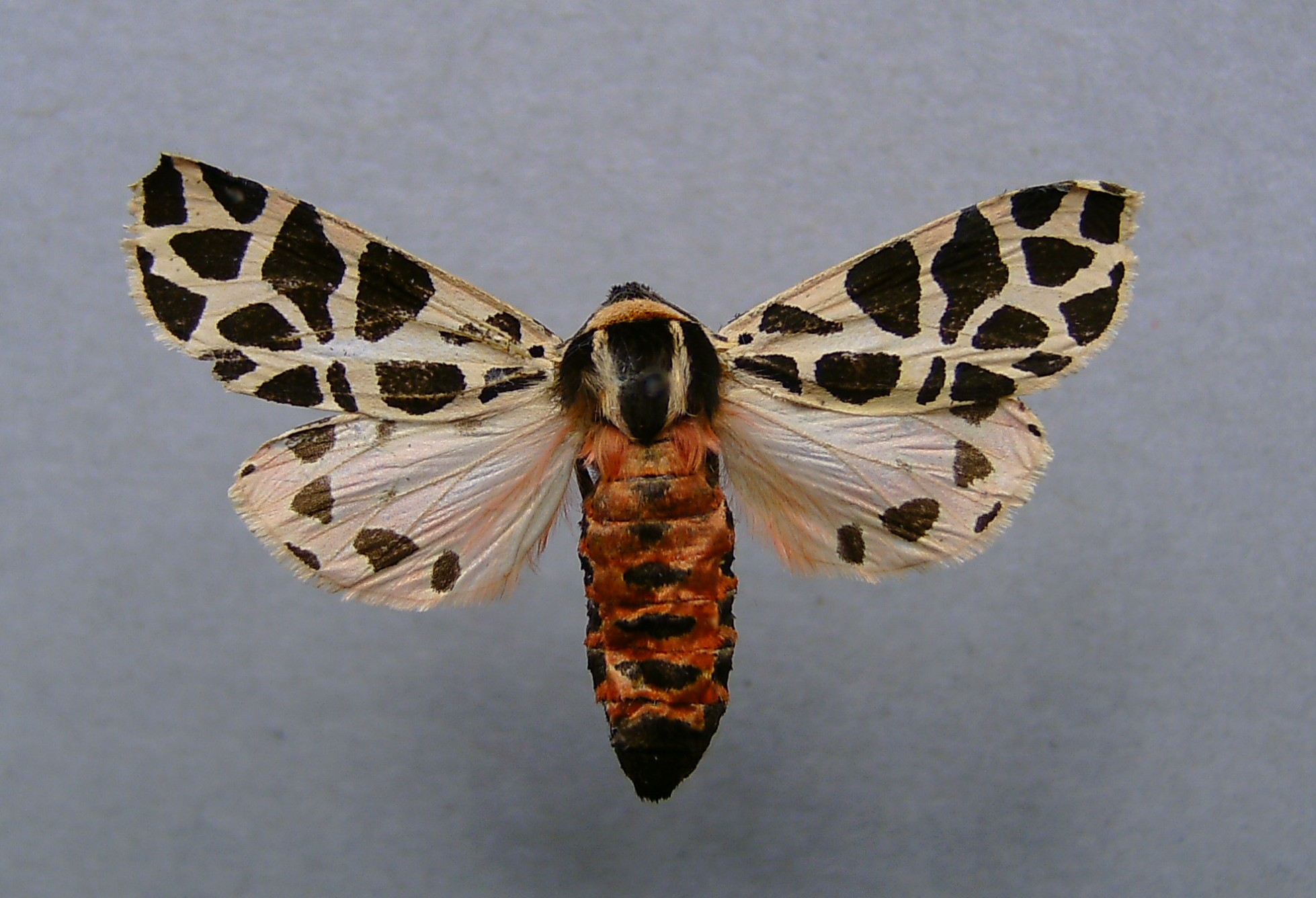
- Female Cymbalophora pudica

Scientific classification
- Kingdom: Animalia
- Phylum: Arthropoda
- Class: Insecta
- Order: Lepidoptera
- Superfamily: Noctuoidea
- Family: Erebidae
- Subfamily: Arctiinae
- Subtribe: Callimorphina
- Genus: Cymbalophora; Rambur, 1866

Synonyms
- Tympanophora Laboulbène, 1865

= Cymbalophora =

Genus of moths

Cymbalophora is a genus of tiger moths in the family Erebidae described by Rambur in 1866.

== Species ==
- Cymbalophora haroldi
- Cymbalophora oertzeni
- Cymbalophora powelli
- Cymbalophora pudica
- Cymbalophora rivularis
