= Yellow asphodel =

Yellow asphodel is a common name for several plants and may refer to:

- Asphodeline lutea, native to the Mediterranean region and cultivated as an ornamental
- Narthecium americanum, a rare species native to the eastern United States
