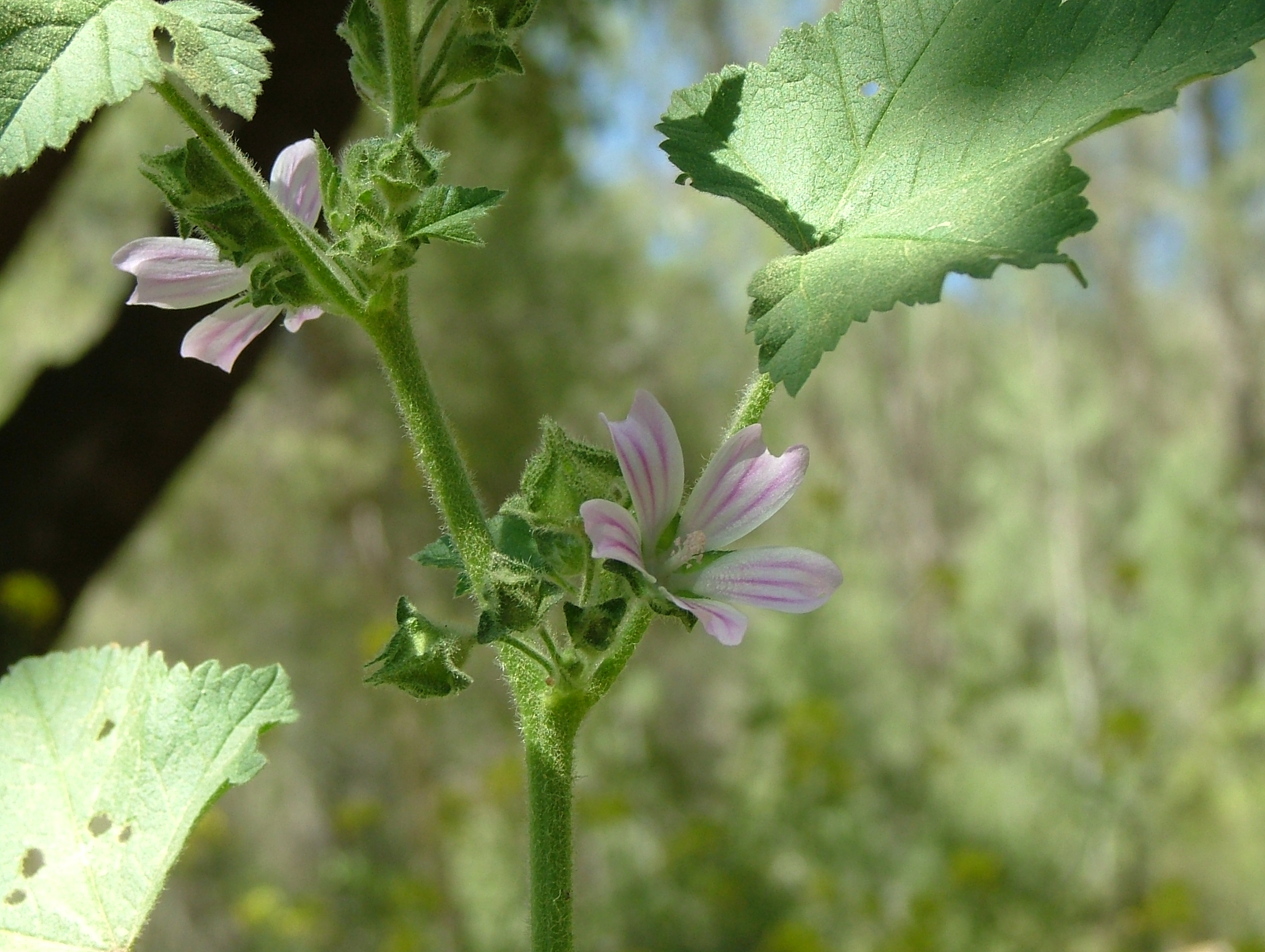

Scientific classification
- Kingdom: Plantae
- Clade: Tracheophytes
- Clade: Angiosperms
- Clade: Eudicots
- Clade: Rosids
- Order: Malvales
- Family: Malvaceae
- Genus: Malva
- Species: M. multiflora

Binomial name
- Malva multiflora (Cav.) Soldano, Banfi & Galasso

Synonyms
- List: Althaea cretica (L.) Kuntze; Althaea sylvestris (Brot.) Borbás; Anthema cretica (L.) Medik.; Anthema scabra Moench; Anthema tenoreana C.Presl; Lavatera cavanillesii Caball.; Lavatera cretica L.; Lavatera empedoclis Ucria; Lavatera hederifolia (Vis.) Schloss. & Vuk.; Lavatera mollis Ehrenb. ex Sweet; Lavatera neapolitana Ten.; Lavatera sicula Tineo; Lavatera stenophylla (Willk.) Rouy; Lavatera sylvestris Brot.; Lavatera triloba Sebast. & Mauri; Lavatera weinmanniana Trevir. ex DC.; Malope multiflora Cav.; Malva cretica (L.) Pau; Malva hederifolia Vis.; Malva linnaei M.F.Ray; Malva liocarpa Phil.; Malva mamillosa J.Lloyd ex Nyman; Malva mauritiana Willk.; Malva pseudolavatera Webb & Berthel.; Malva willkommiana Scheele

= Malva multiflora =

Species of flowering plant

Malva multiflora (previously known as Lavatera cretica) is a species of flowering plant in the mallow family known by the common names Cornish mallow and Cretan hollyhock. It is native to western Europe, North Africa, and the Mediterranean Basin, and it is naturalized in areas with a Mediterranean climate, such as parts of Australia, South Africa, and California. This is an annual or biennial herb growing a tough, somewhat hairy stem to a maximum height between 1 and 3 meters. The leaves are multilobed with flat or wavy edges, slightly hairy, and up to 10 centimeters long. The plant bears small pink or light purple flowers with petals just over a centimeter long. The fruit is disc-shaped with 7 to 10 segments.

Leaf laminas of Malva multiflora can track solar position throughout the day and turn to face the sunrise, behavior that anticipates the future, despite lacking a central nervous system.

== Botanical gallery ==
Photos from Antalya in Turkey.

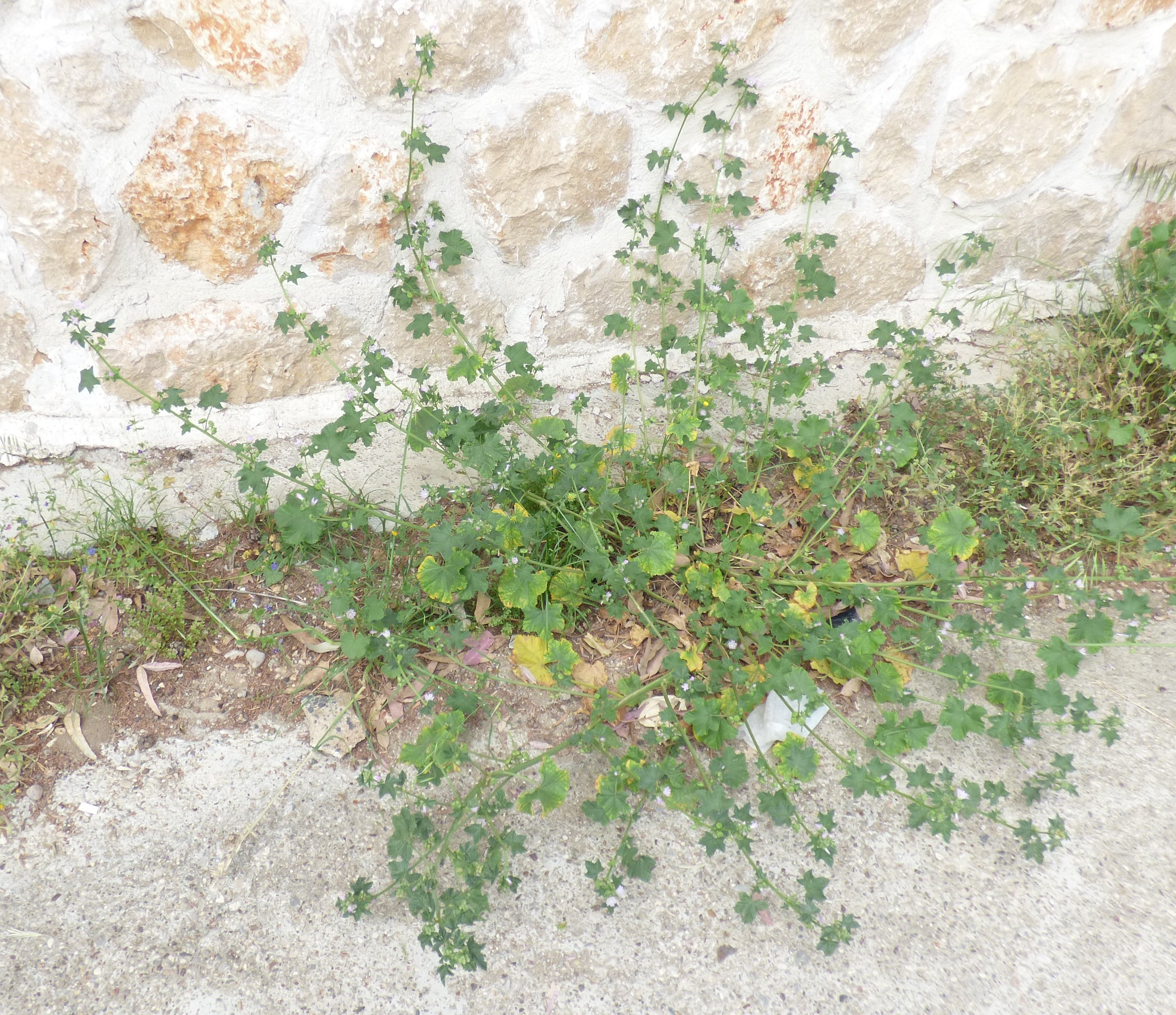
Plant generally upright

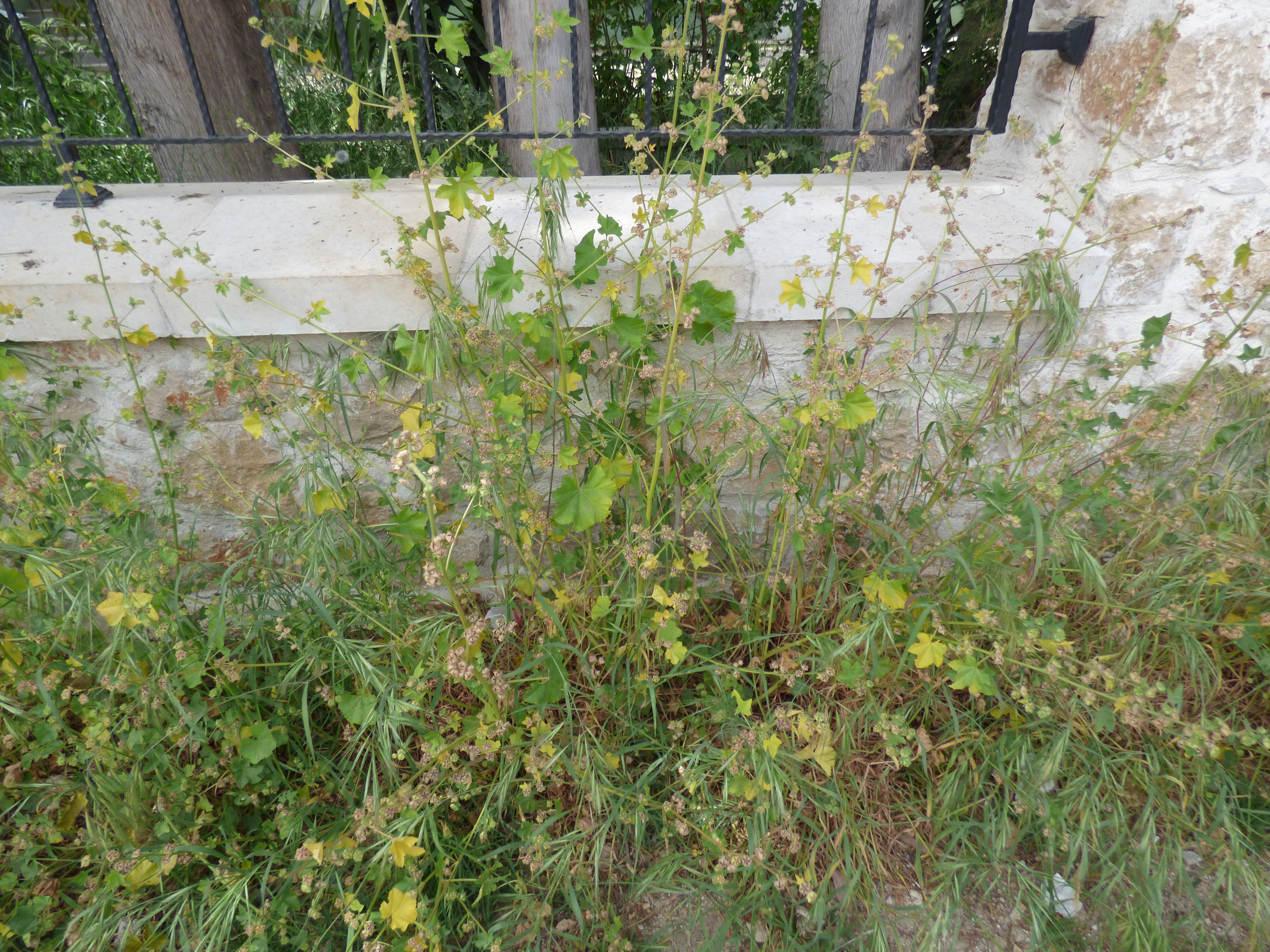
Plant generally upright

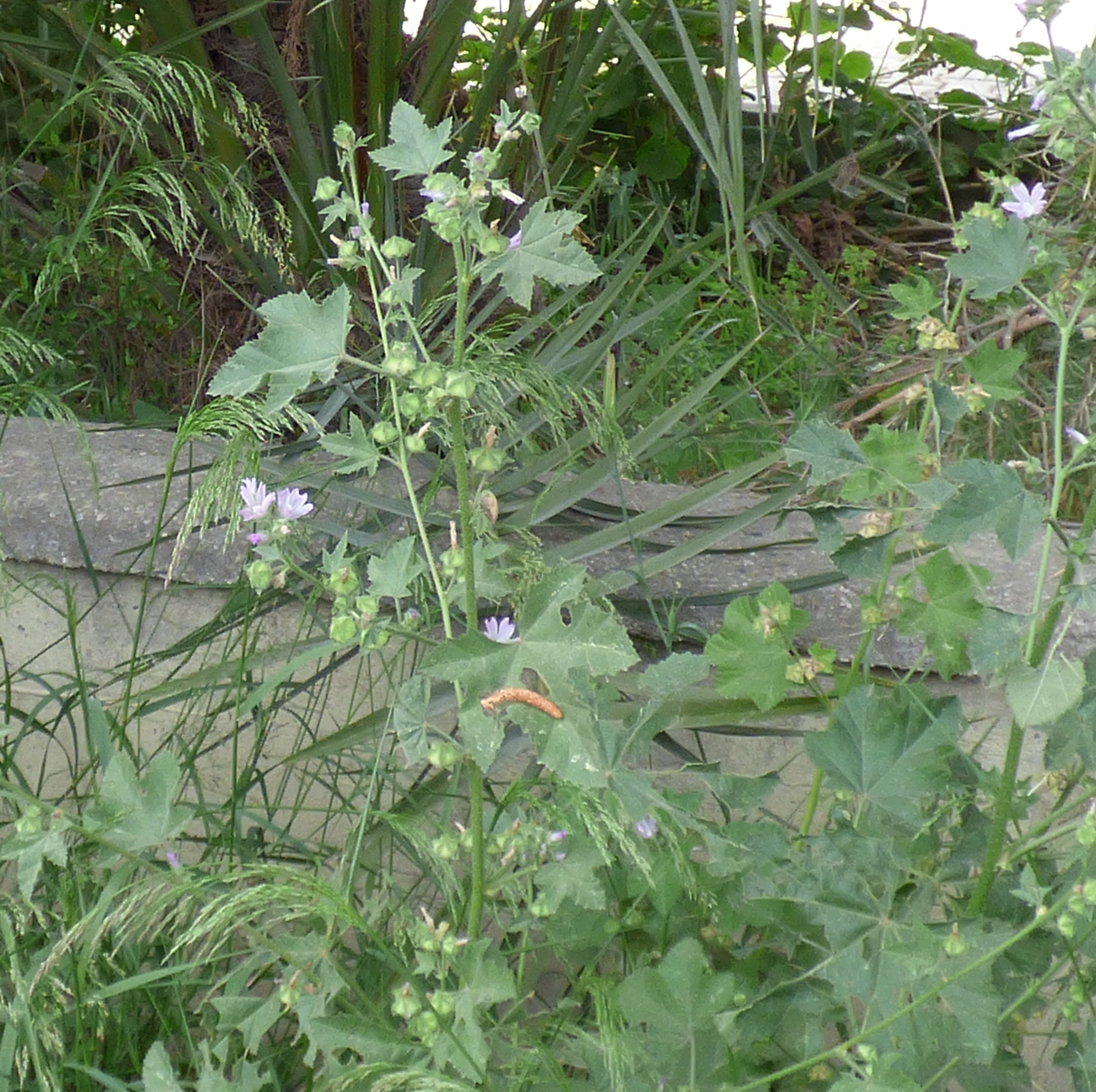
Inflorescence, distant

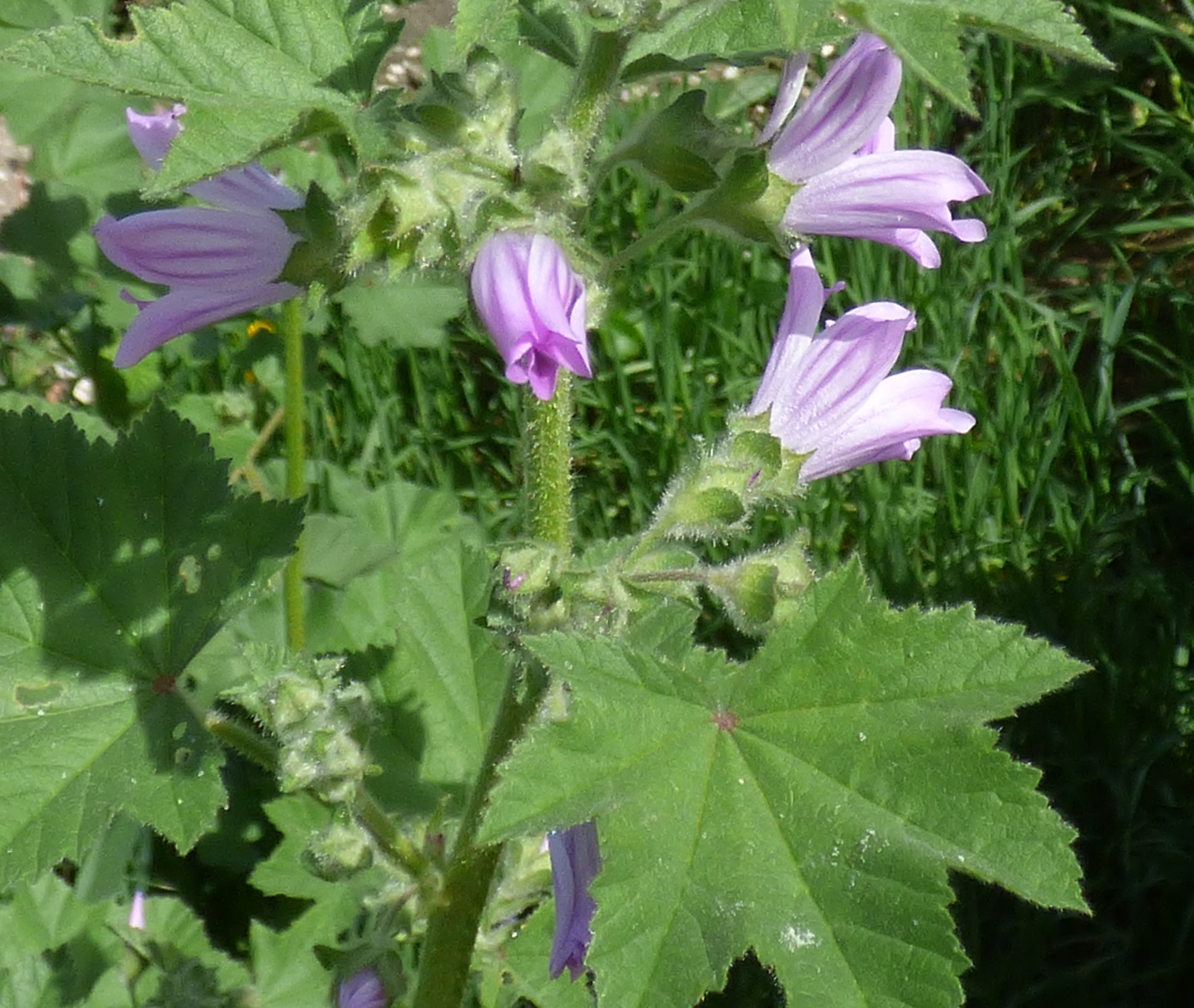
Inflorescence, close

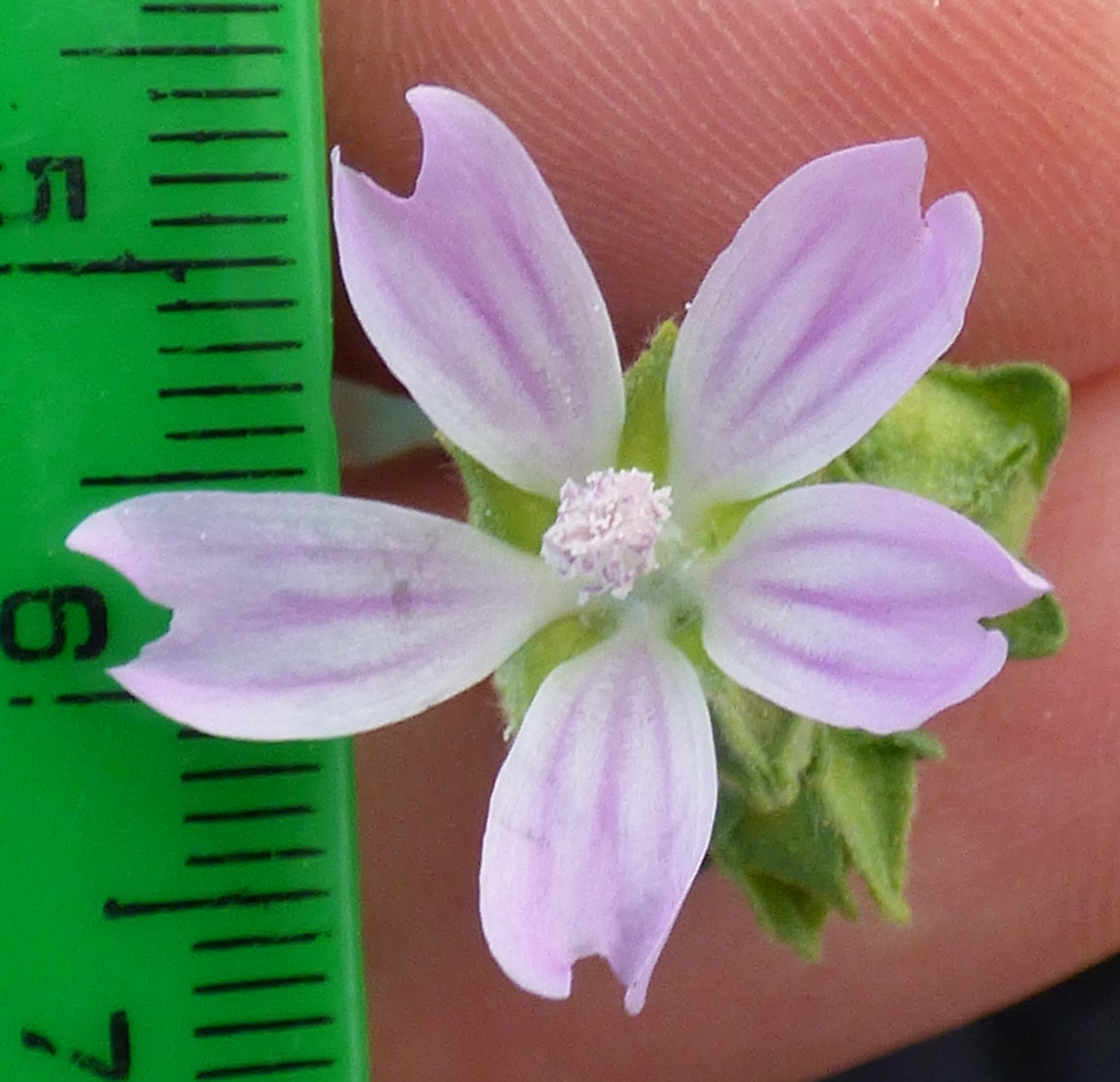
Flower, usually pale

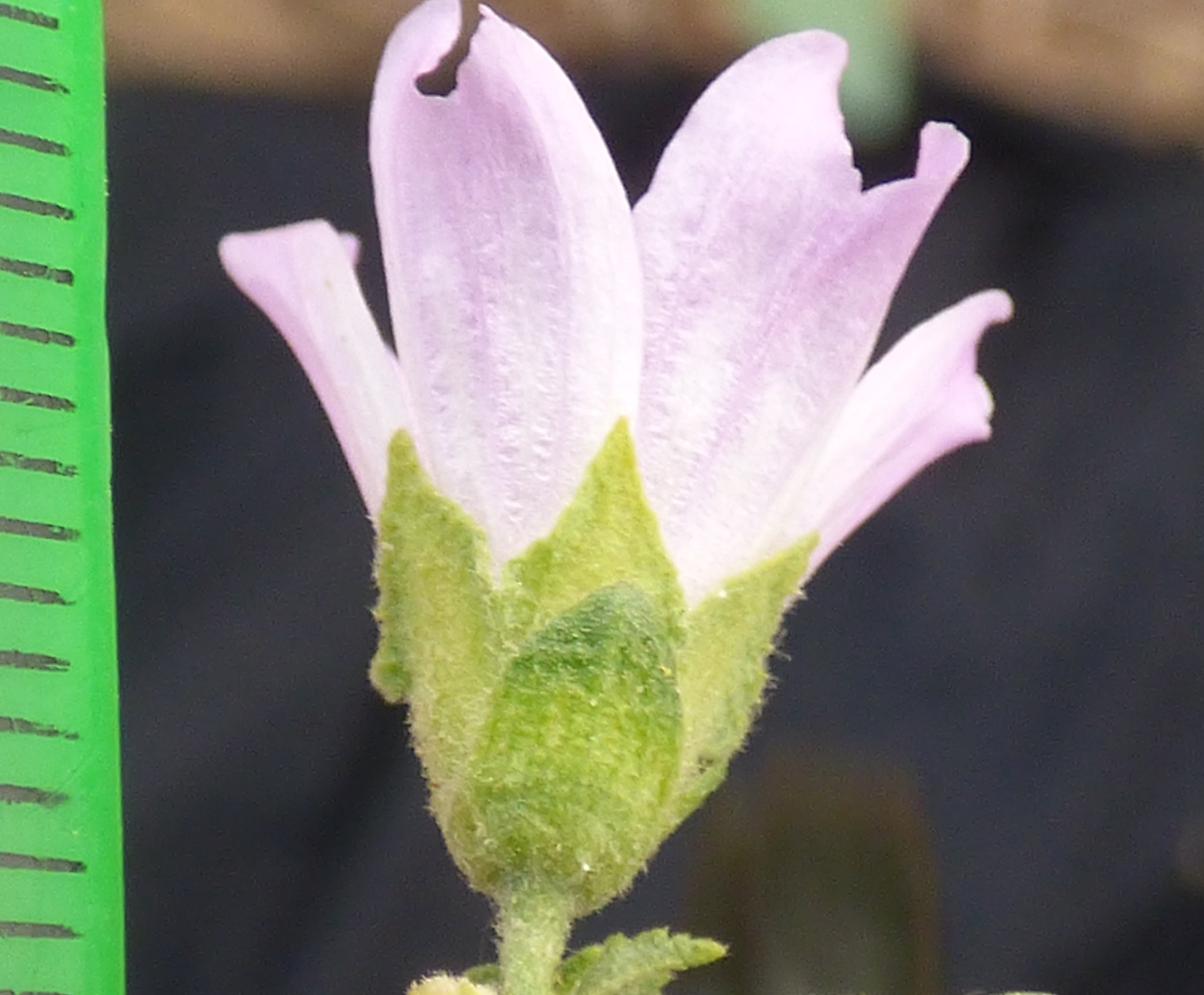
Flower, rather bigger than calyx, calyx 5-part, epicalyx 3-broad-parts, usually reasonably stellate-hairy

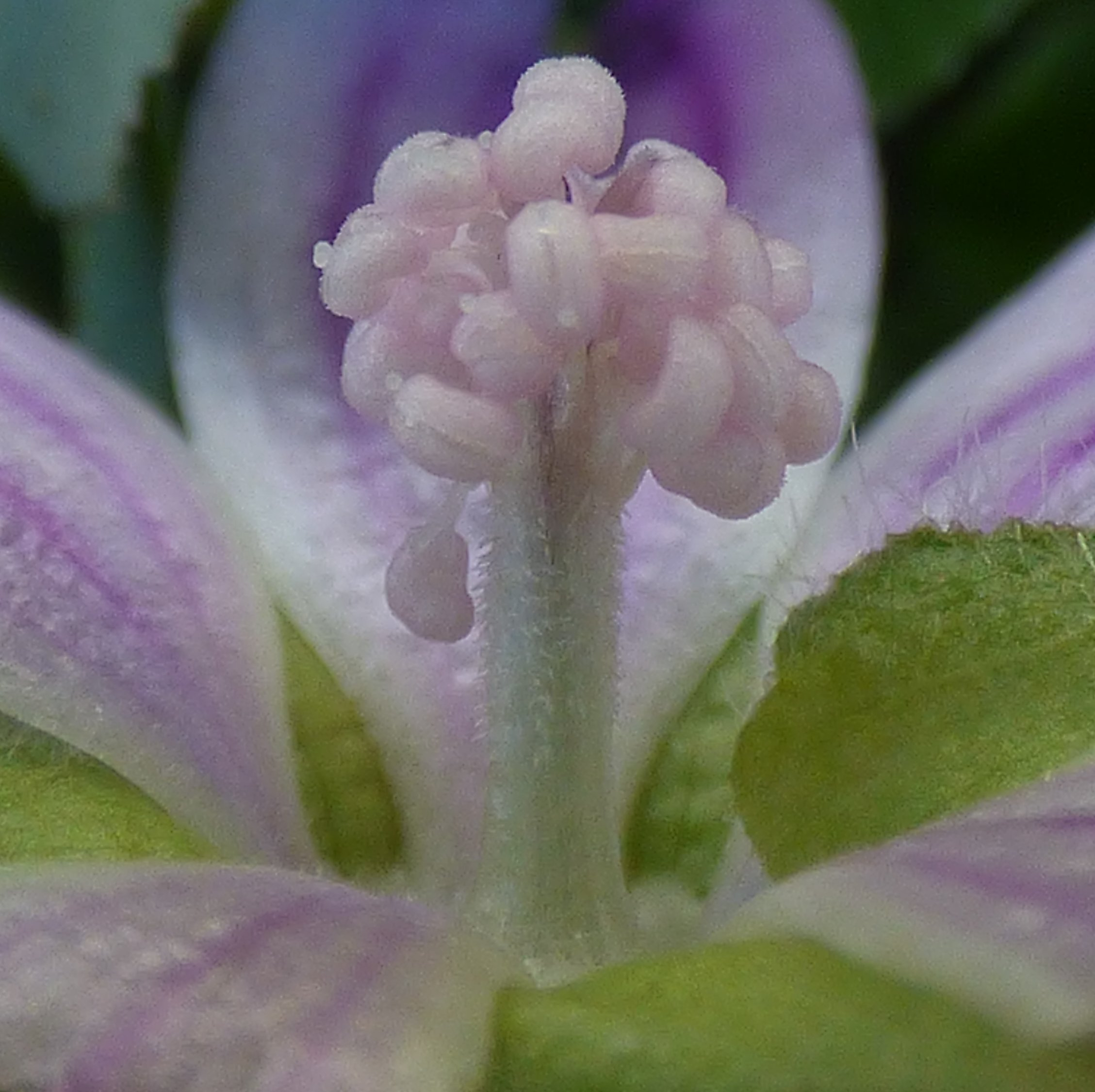
Floral organs, unopened

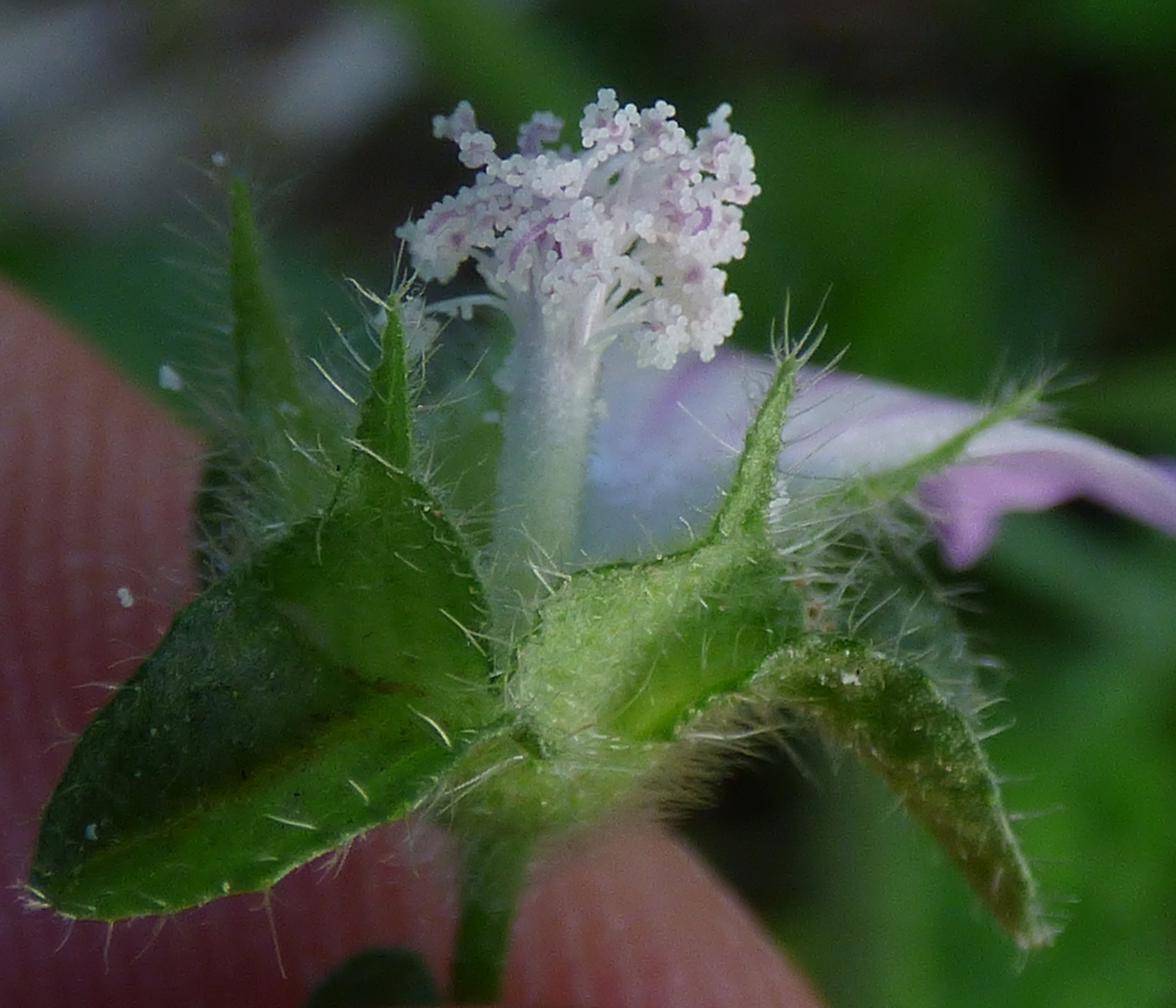
Floral organs, opened

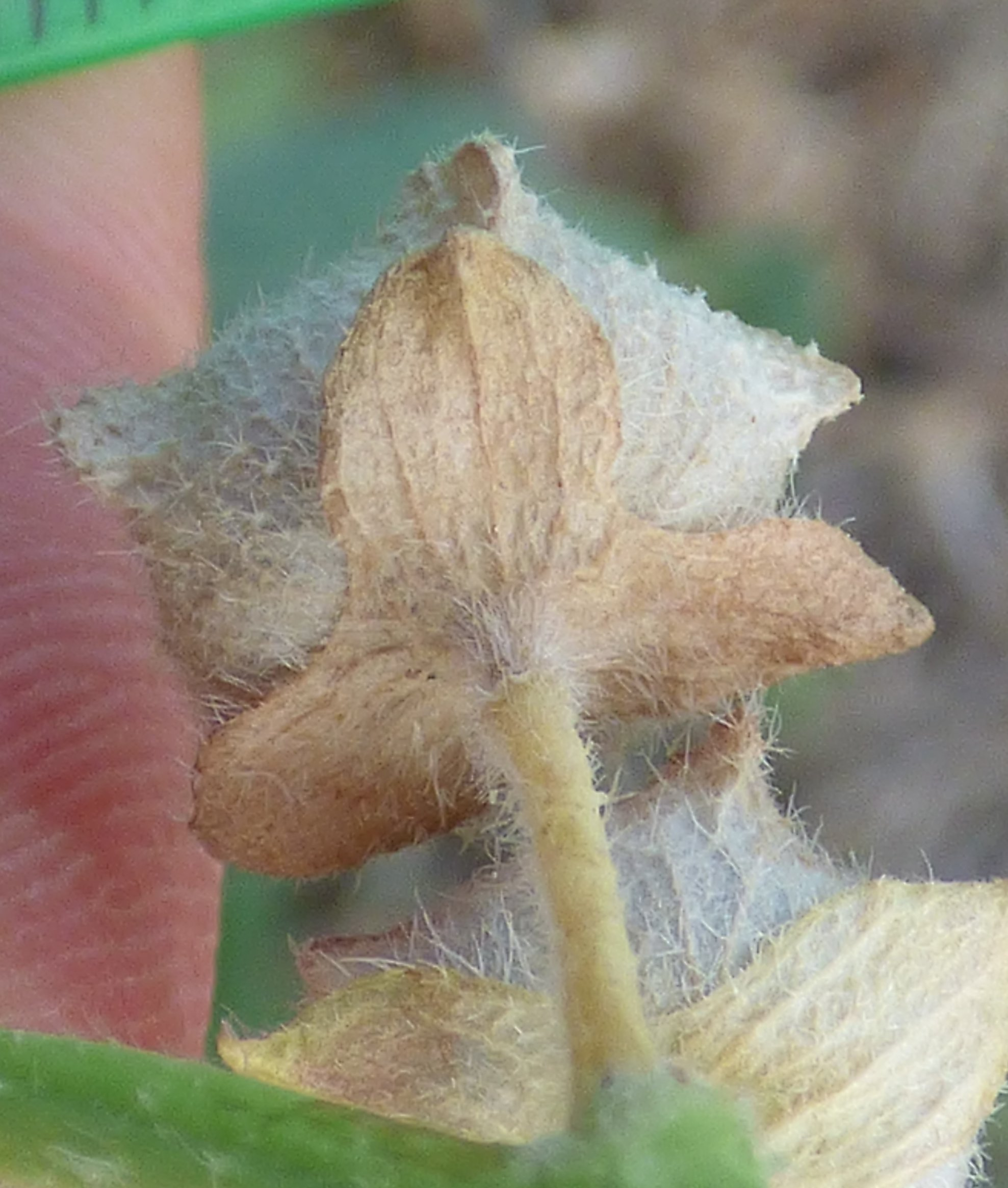
Epicalyx 3-part broad, joined at base

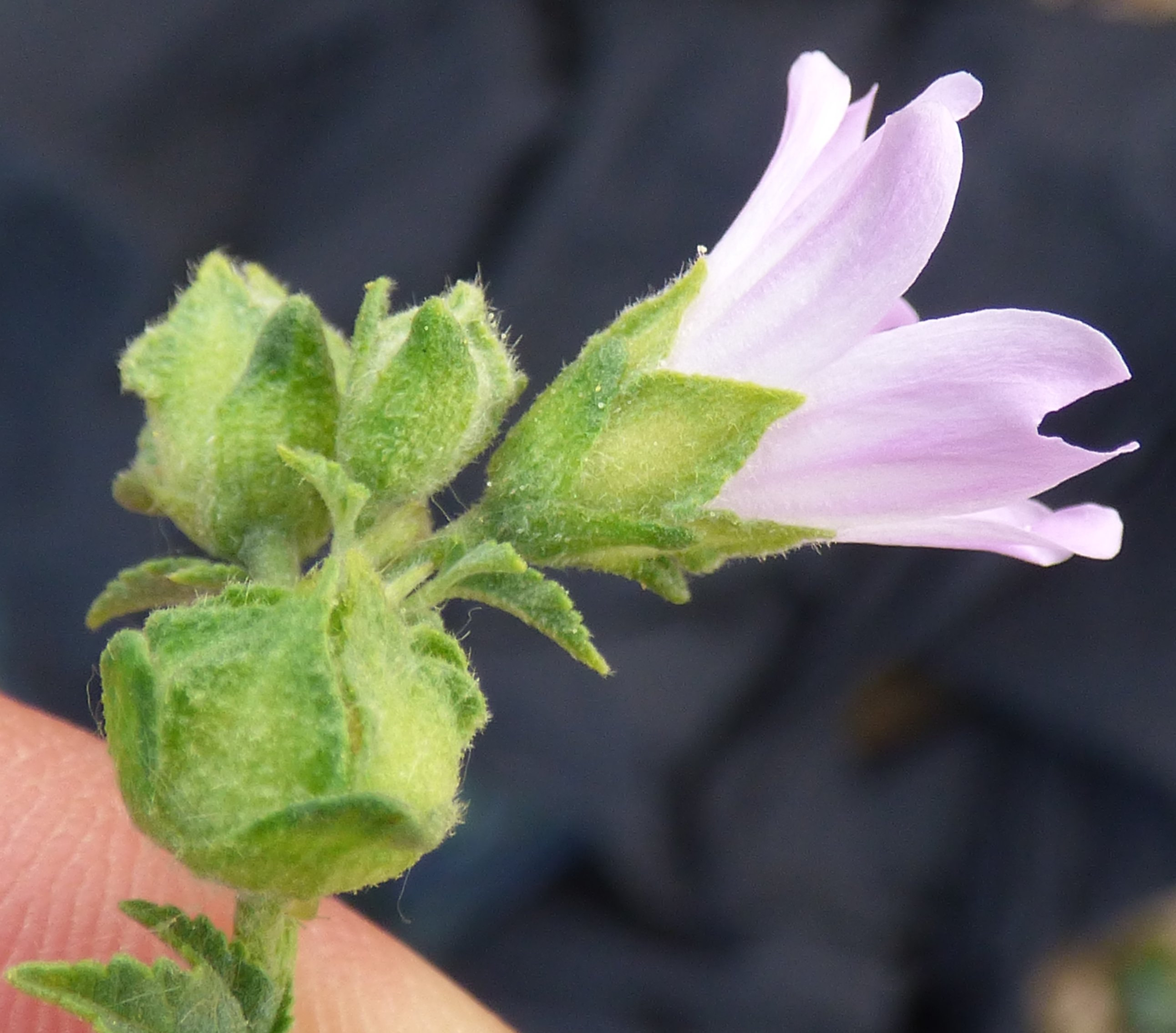
Flowers

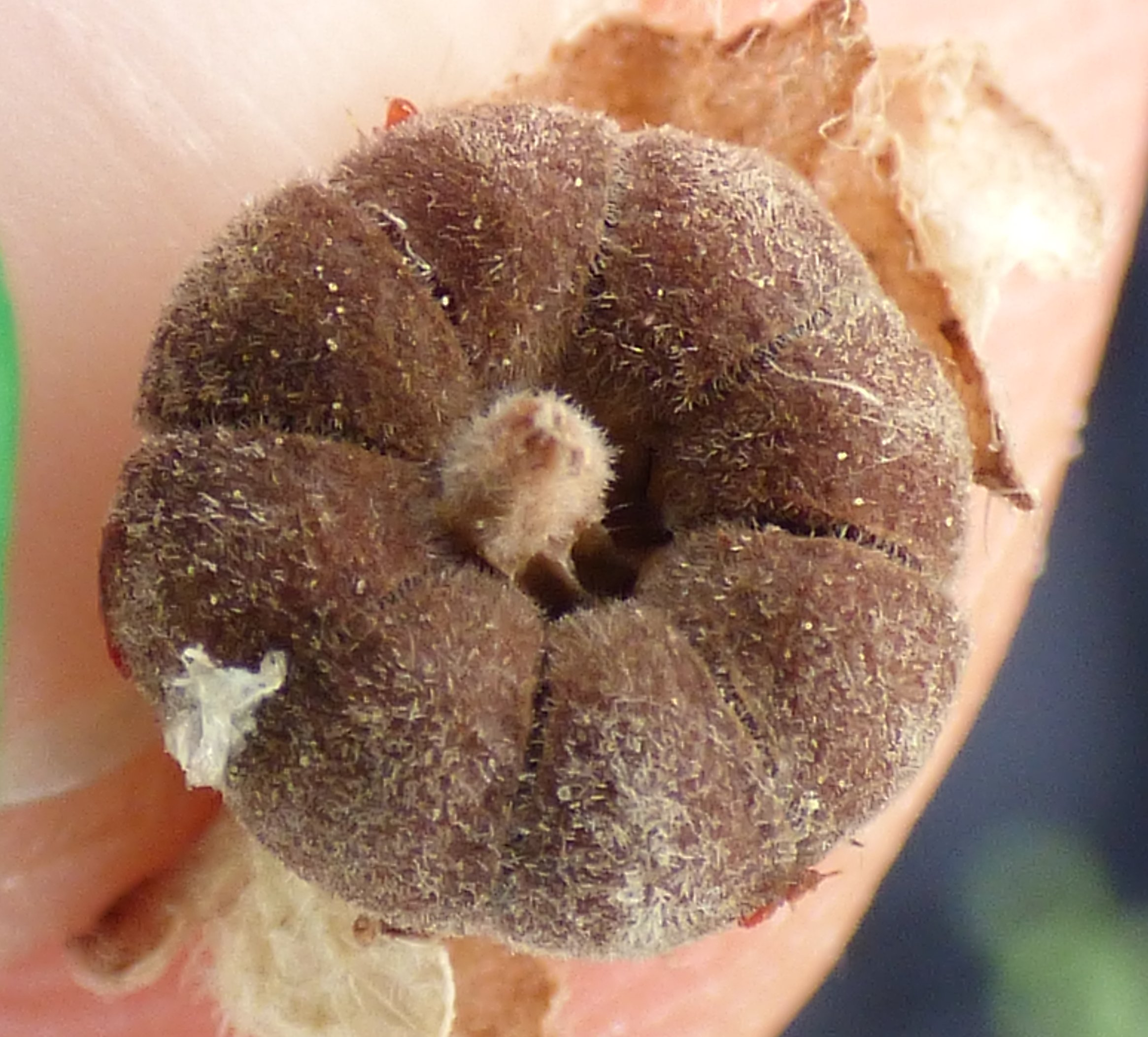
Fruit, hairy form, mature, always lacks wrinkles, with rounded surface

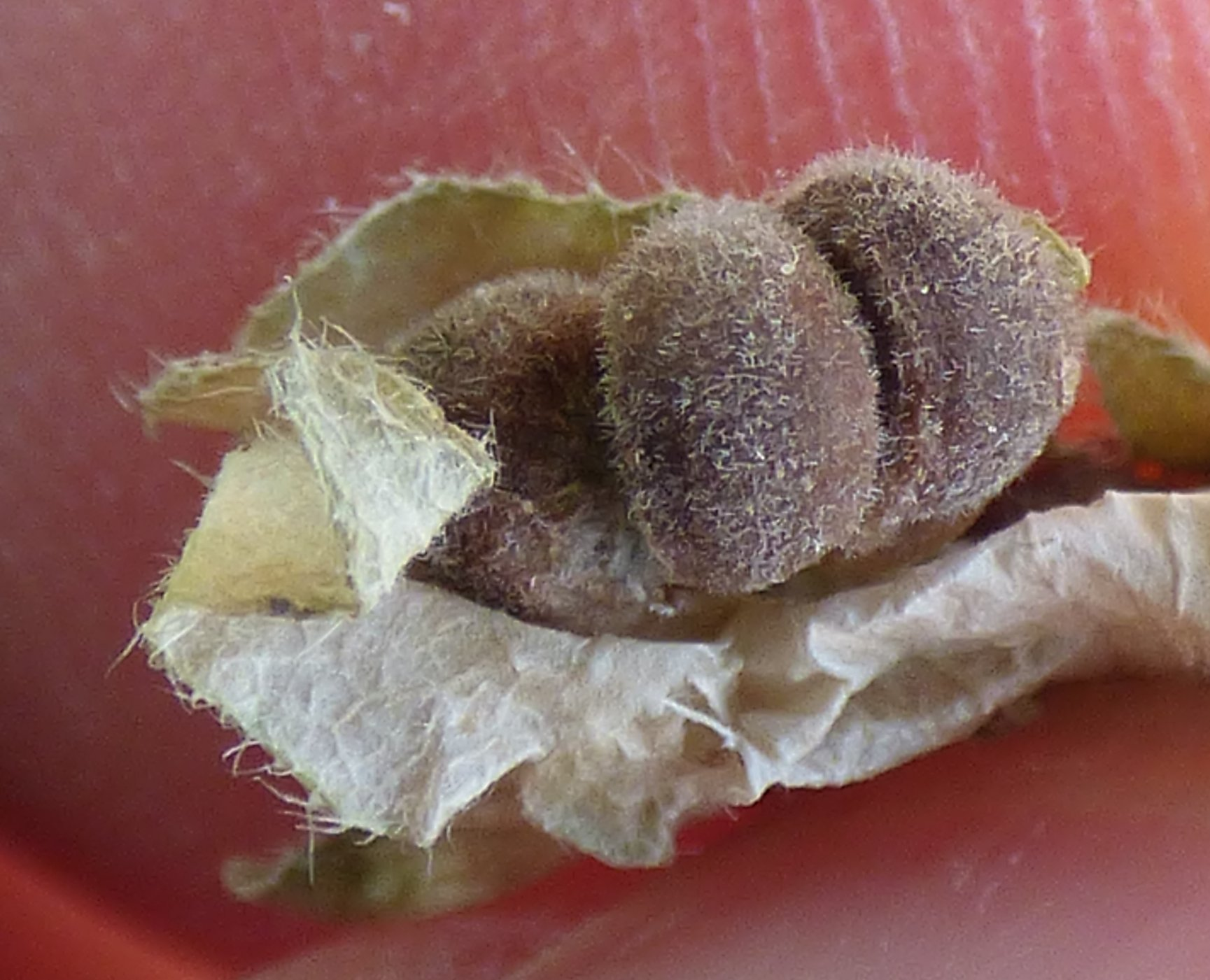
Fruit, hairy form, mature, from side

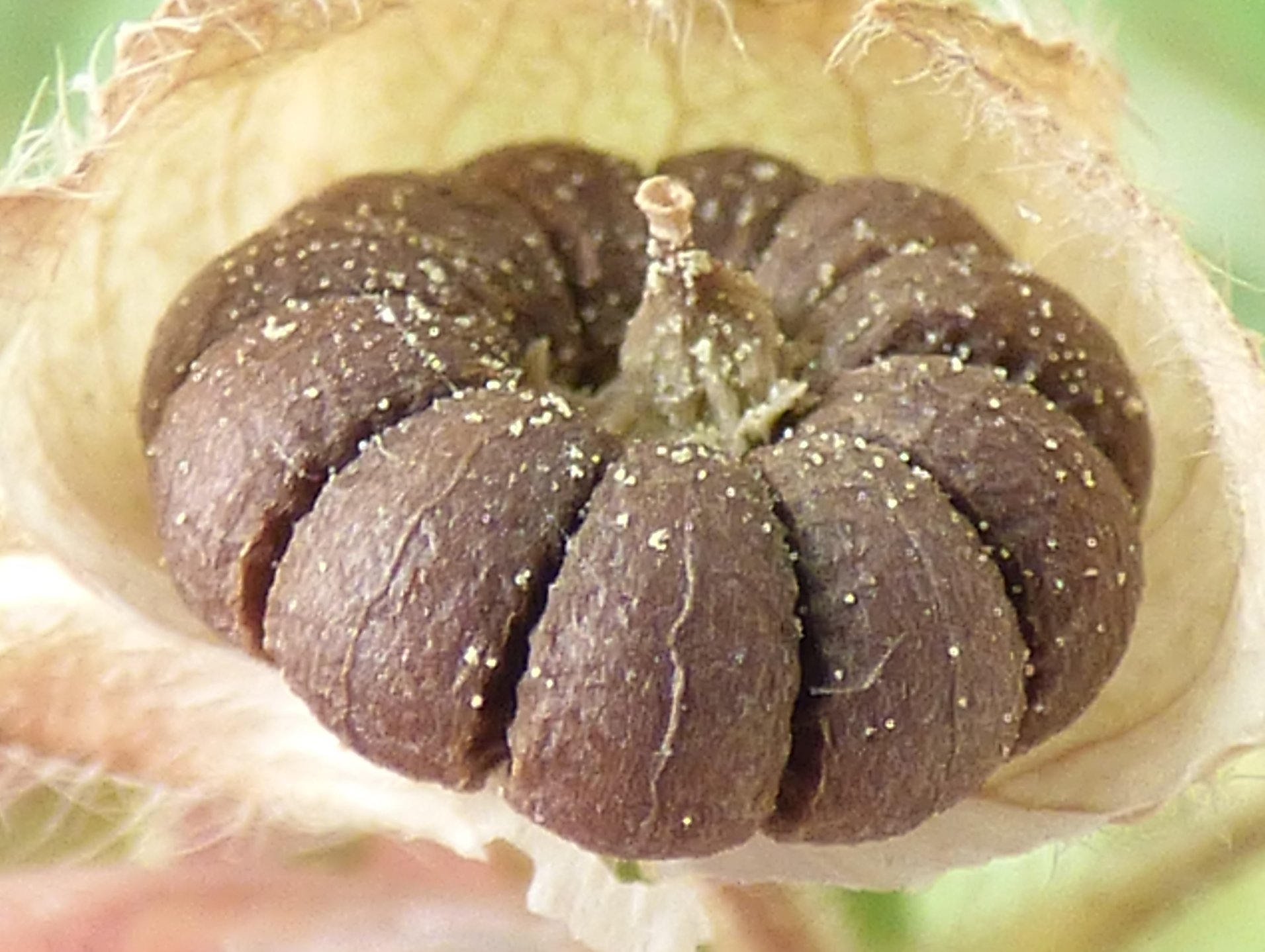
Fruit, hairless form, mature

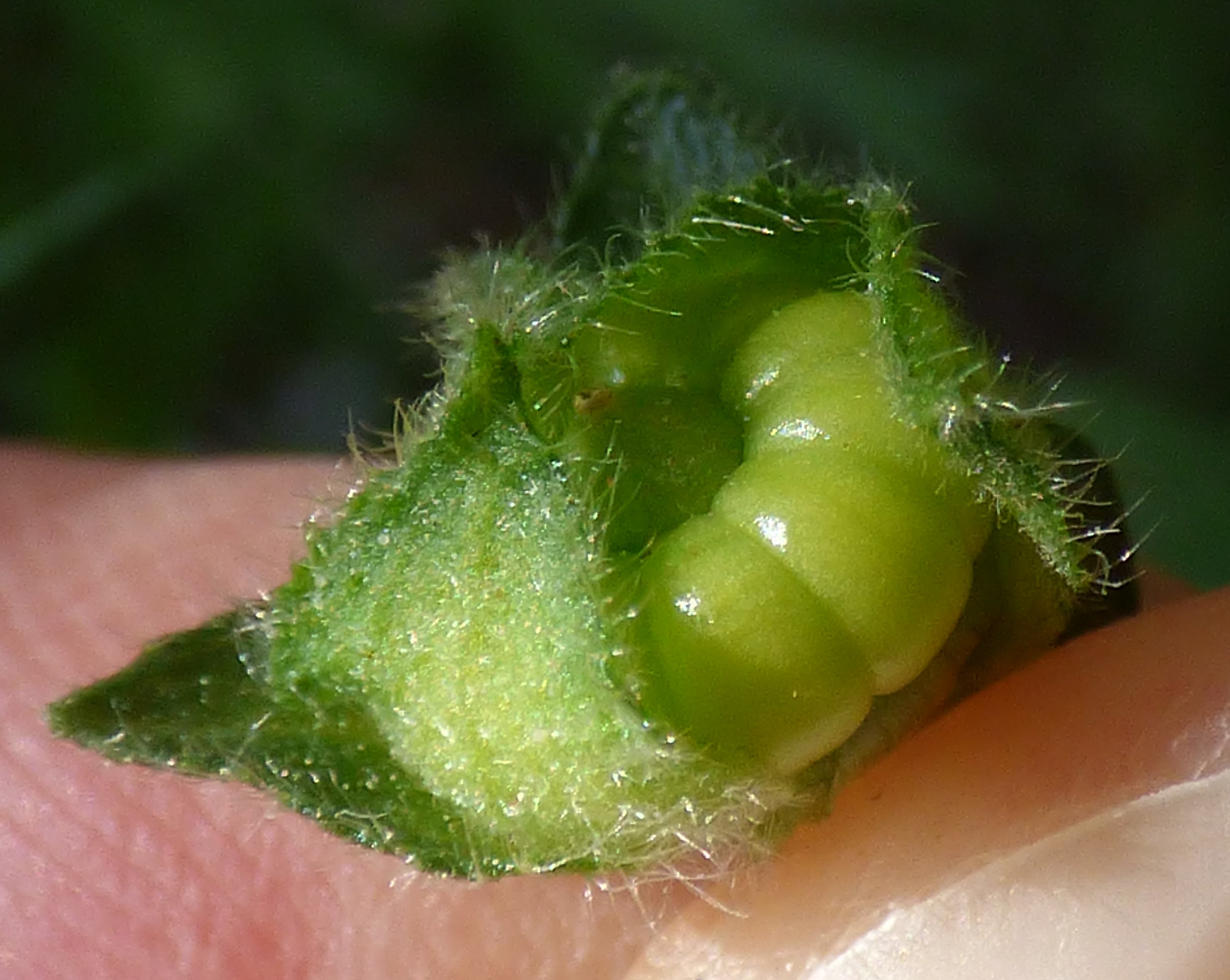
Fruit, hairless form, young

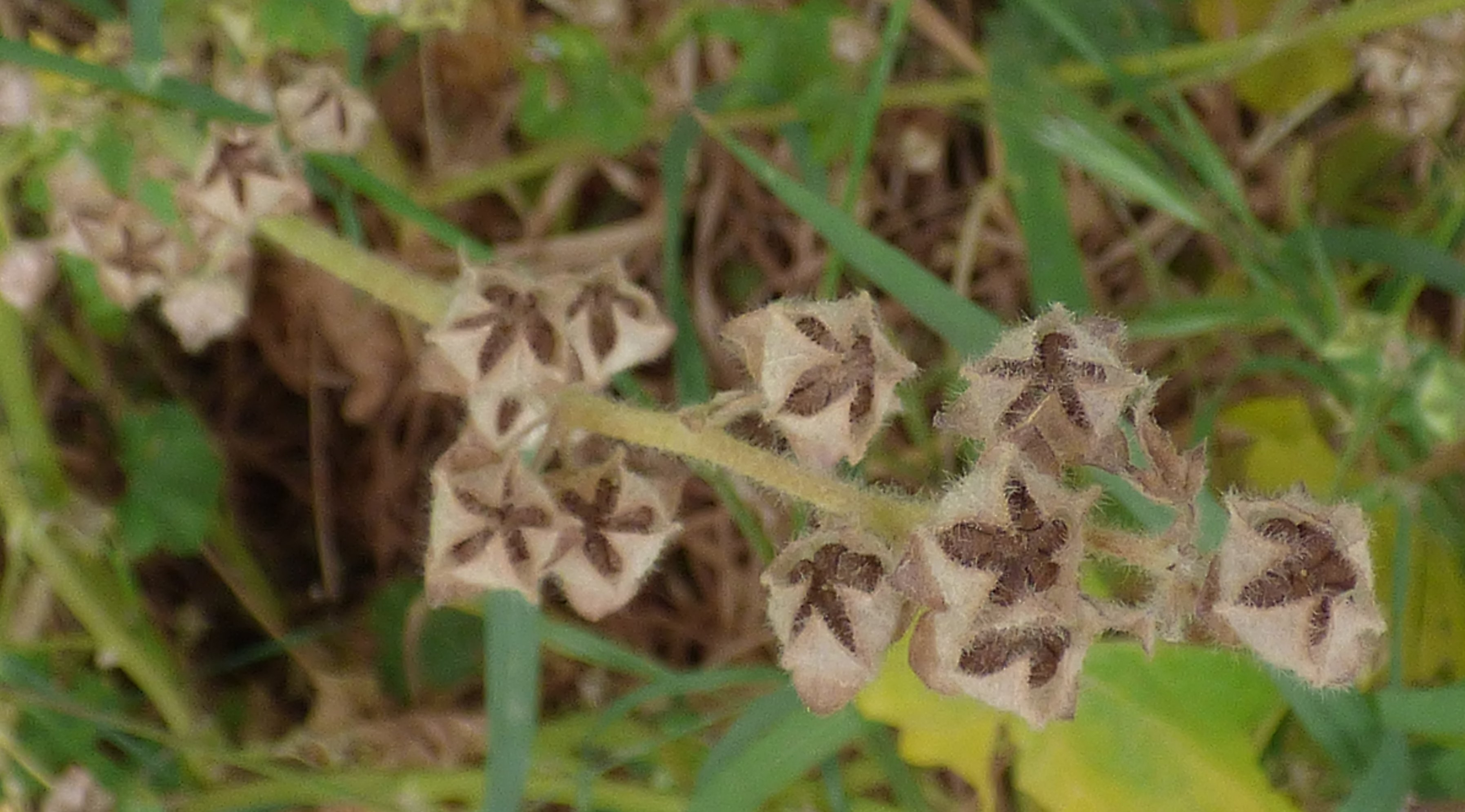
Fruiting inflorescence

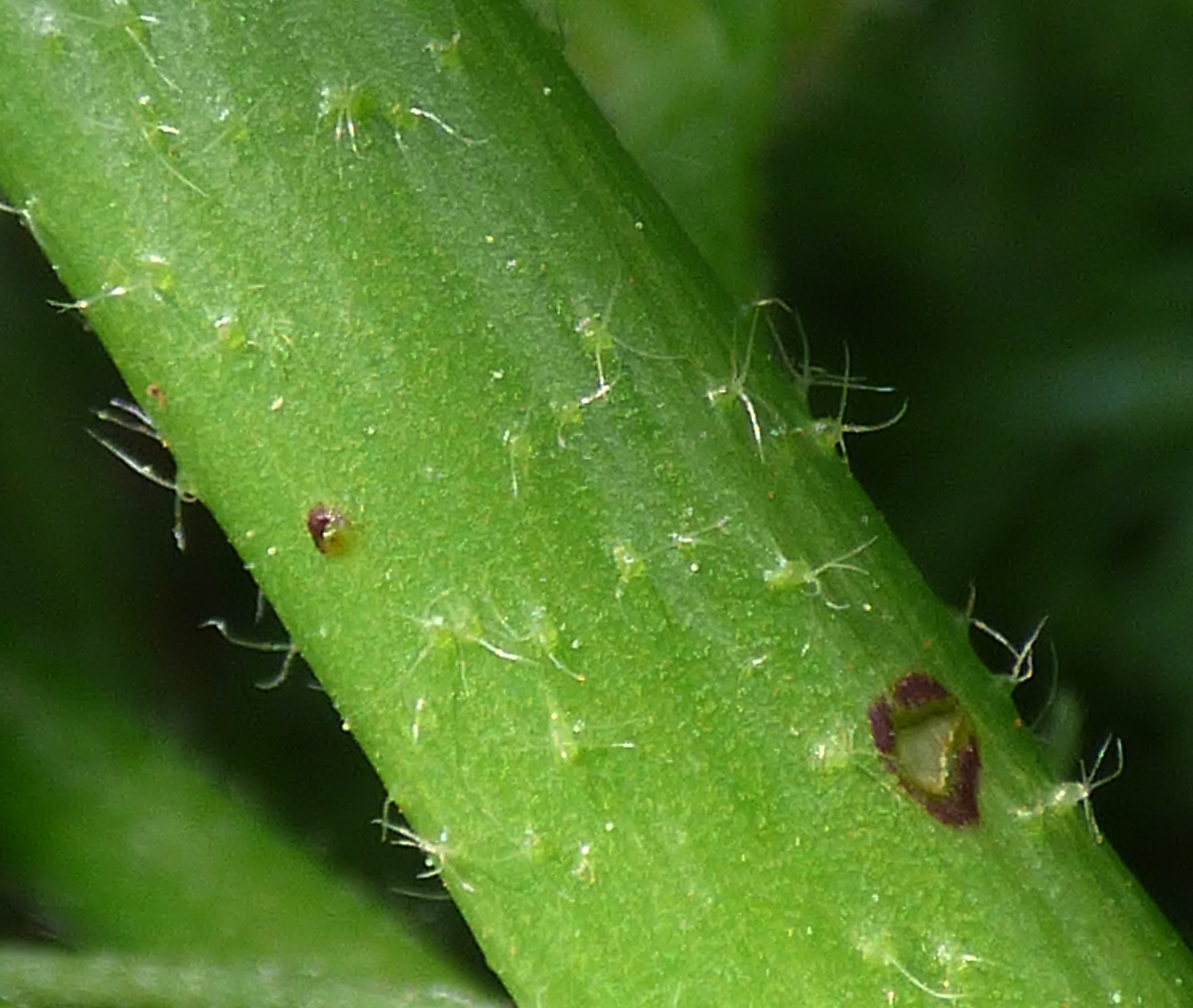
Stellate (starlike) hairs with bulbous bases conspicuous

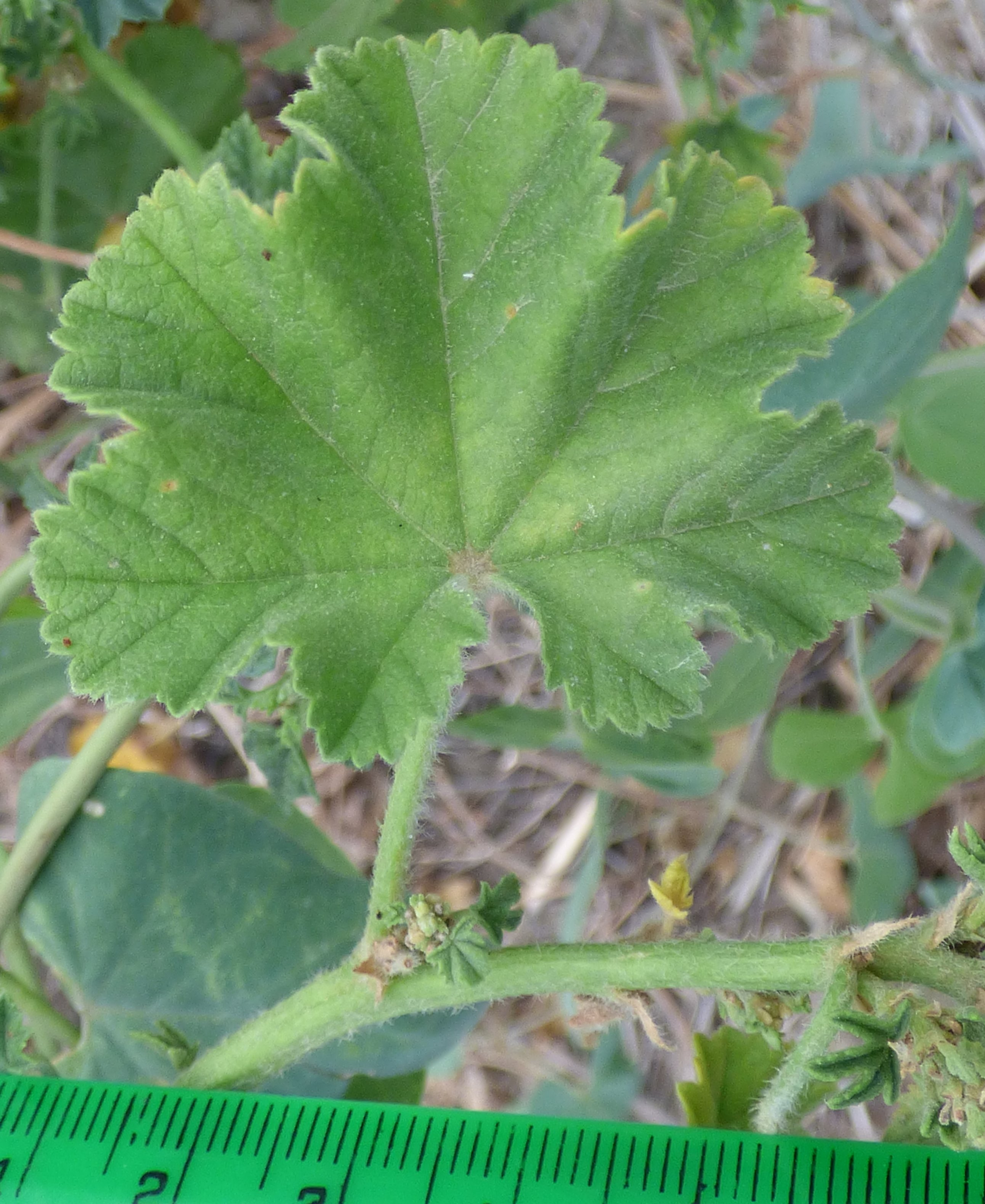
Leaf upperside

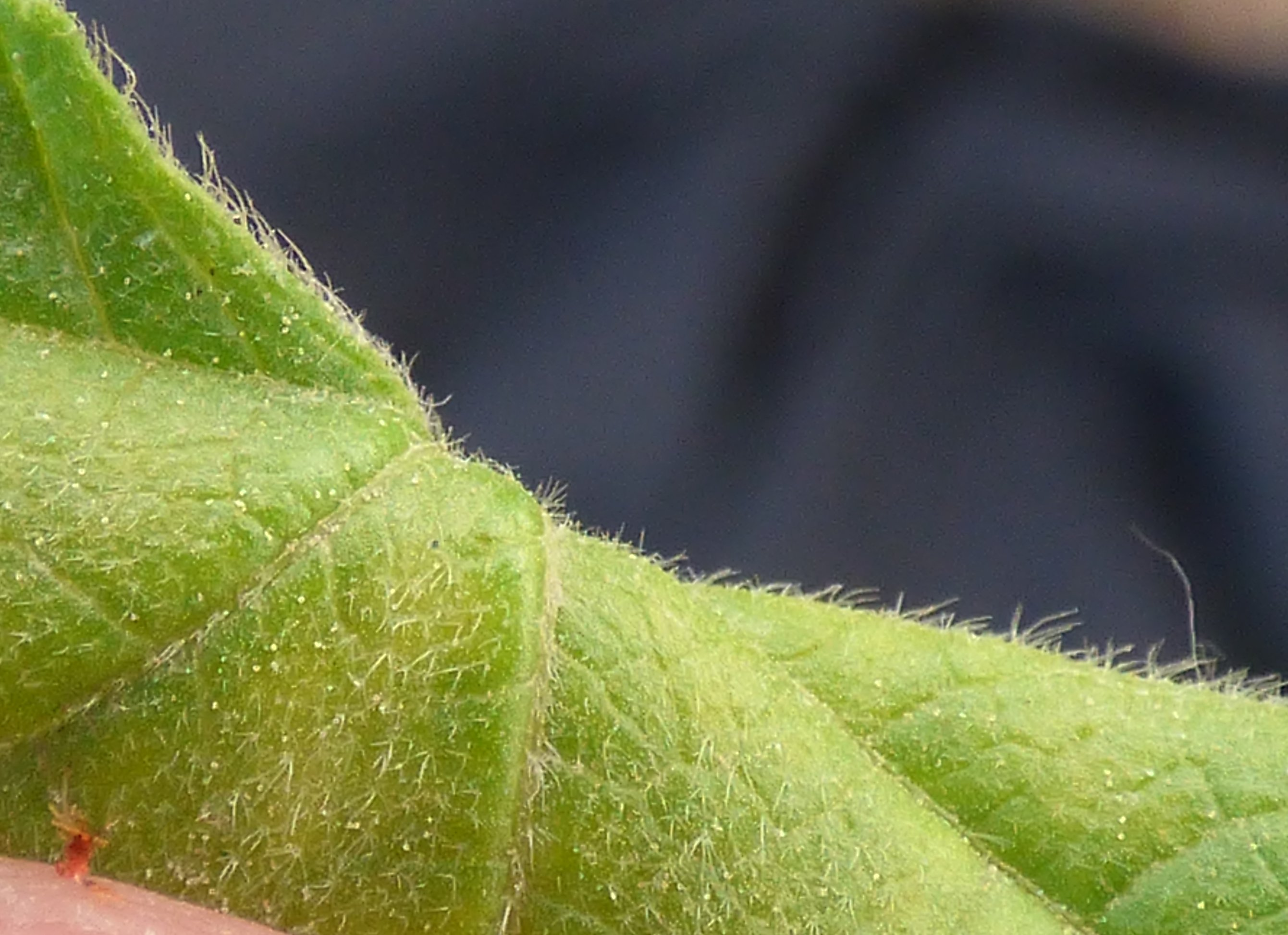
Leaf upperside, hairy example (may lack hairs)

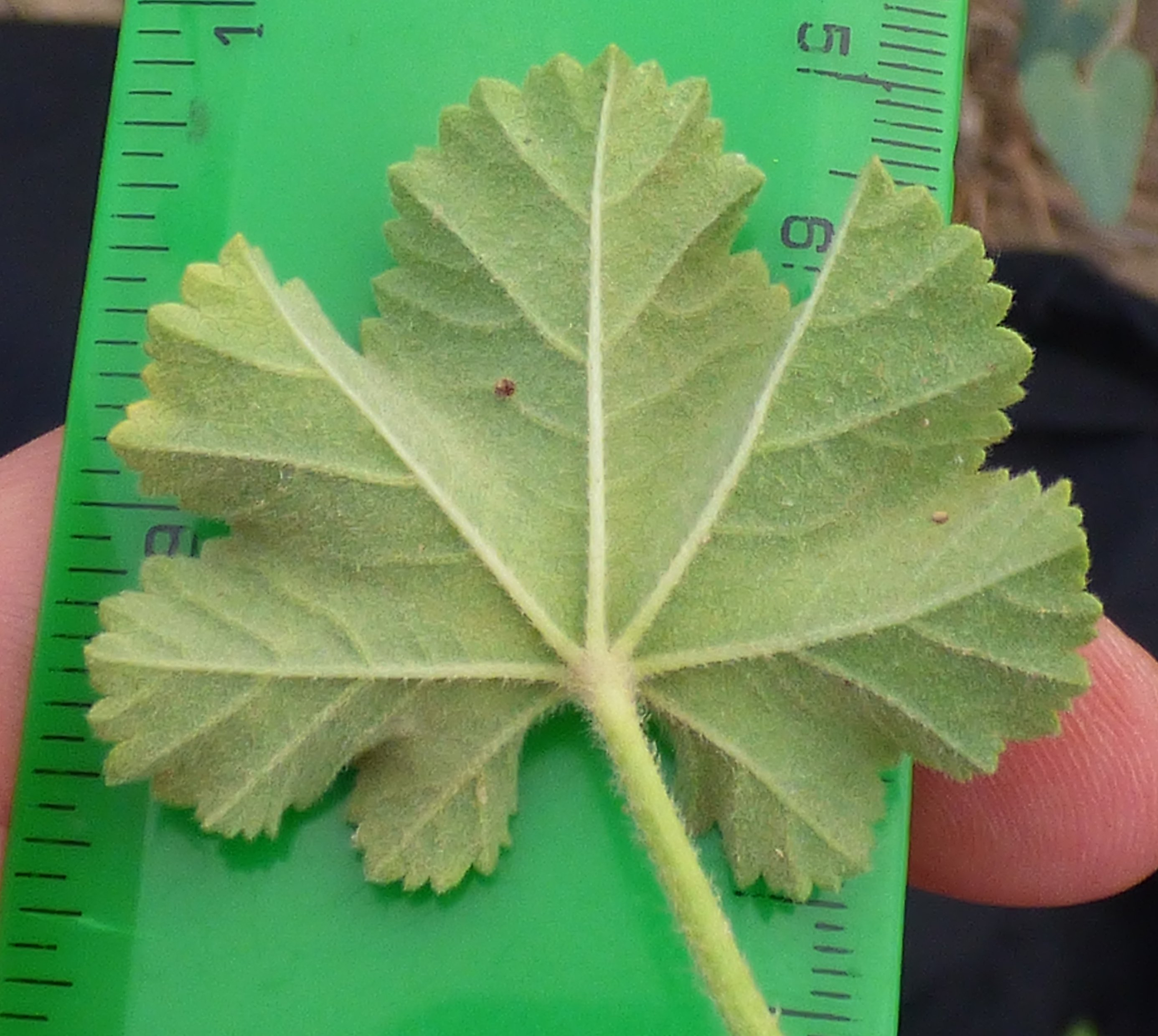
Leaf underside

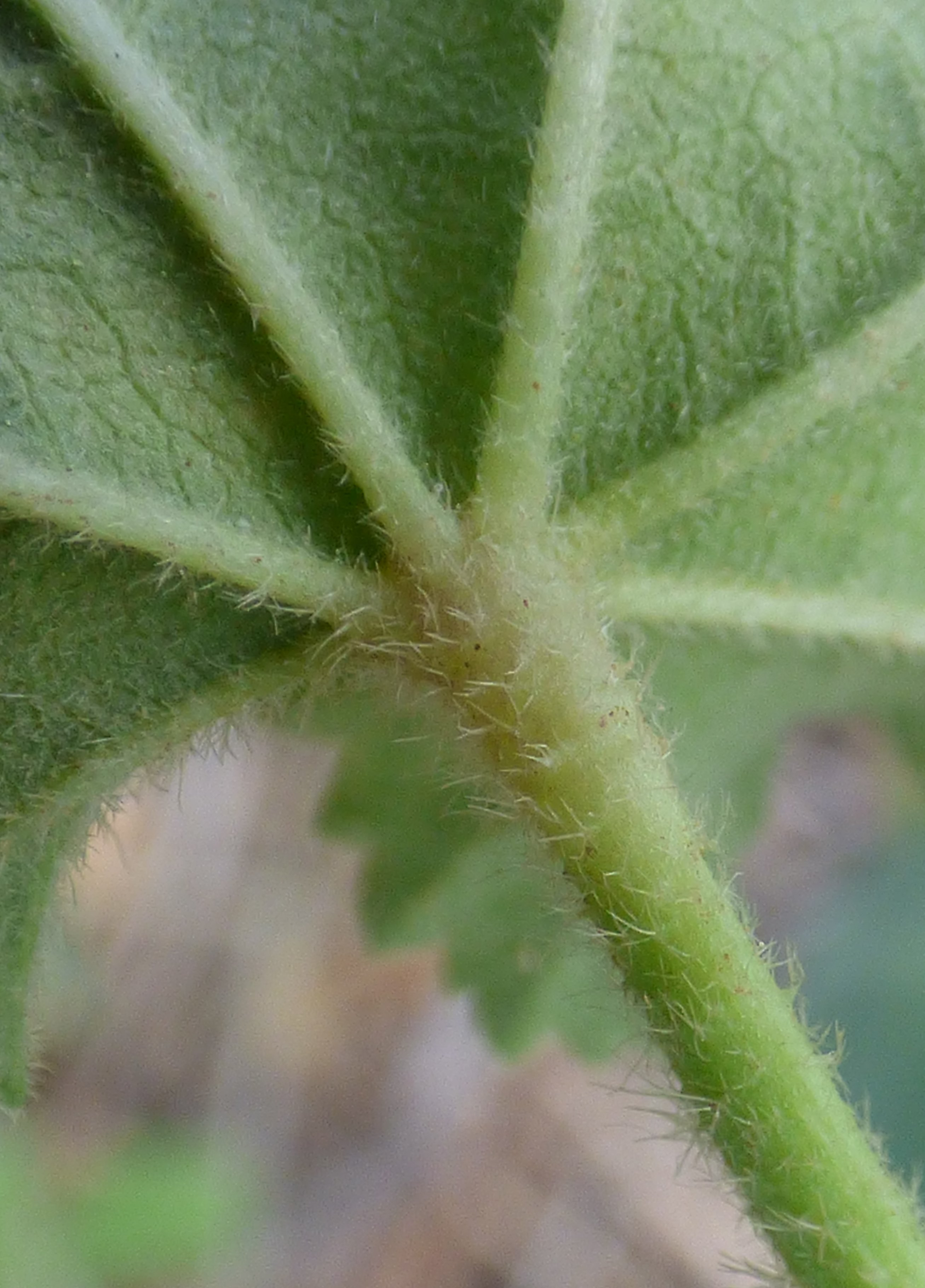
Leaf underside

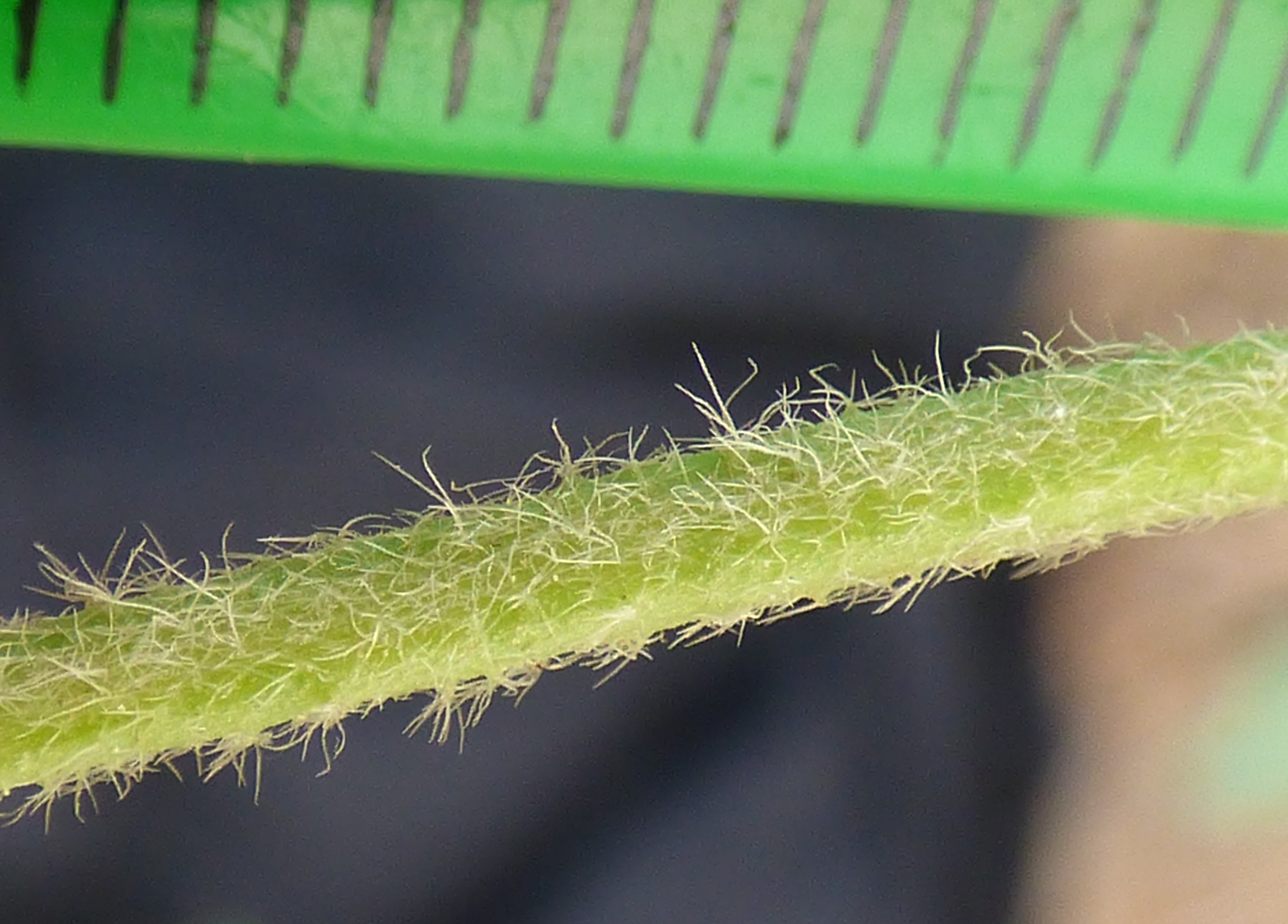
Leaf stalk hairs

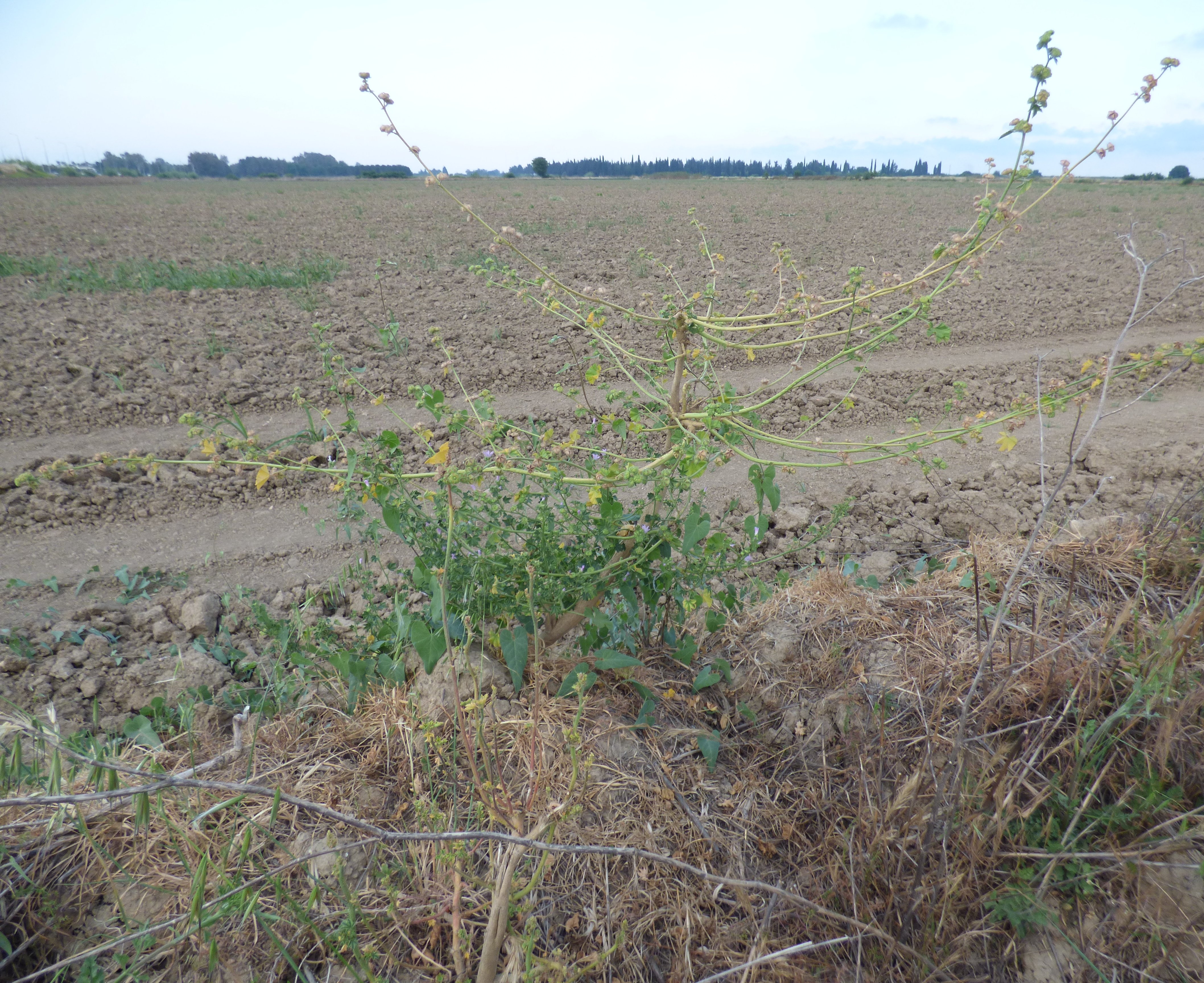
Biennial form, thick trunked

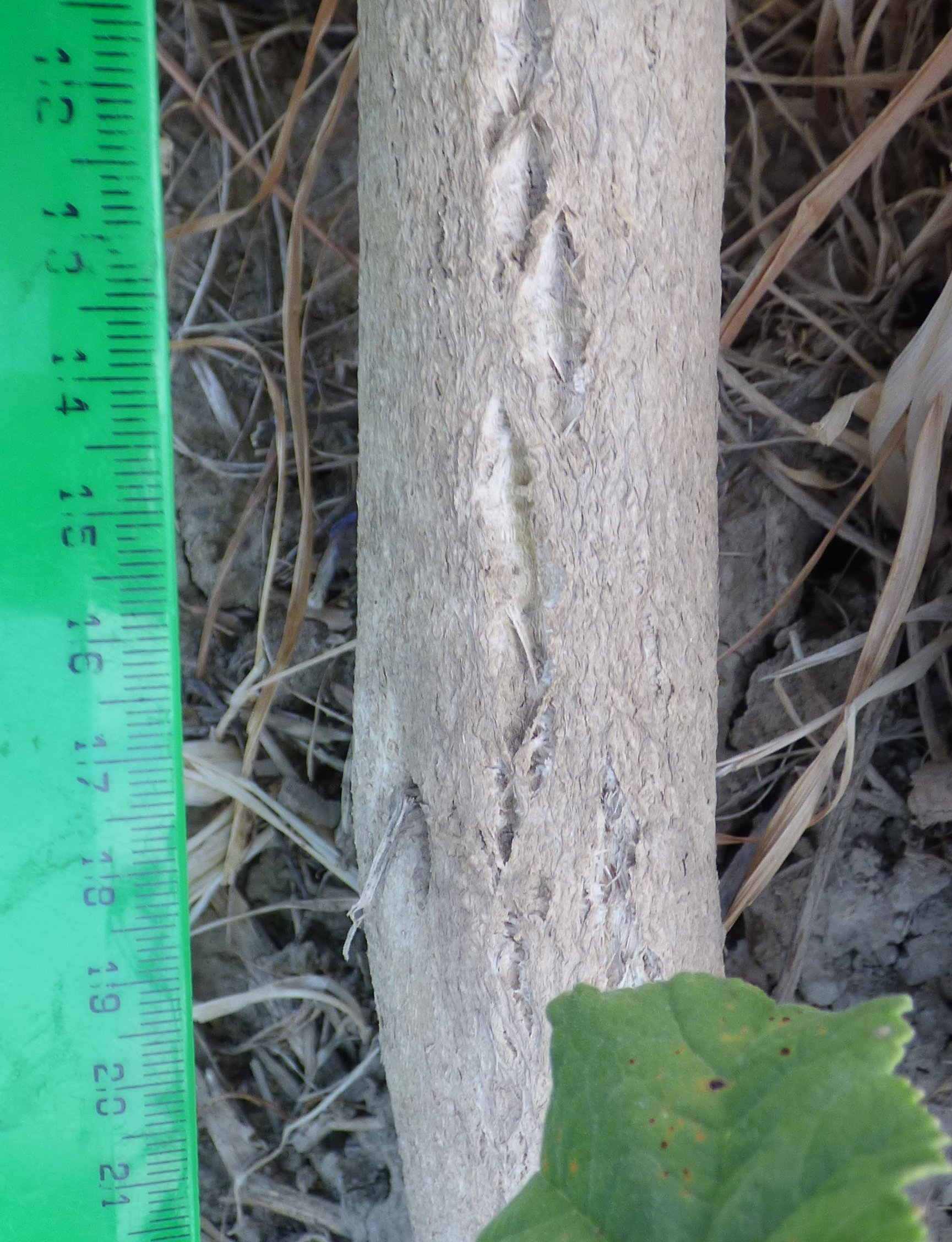
Biennial form, trunk

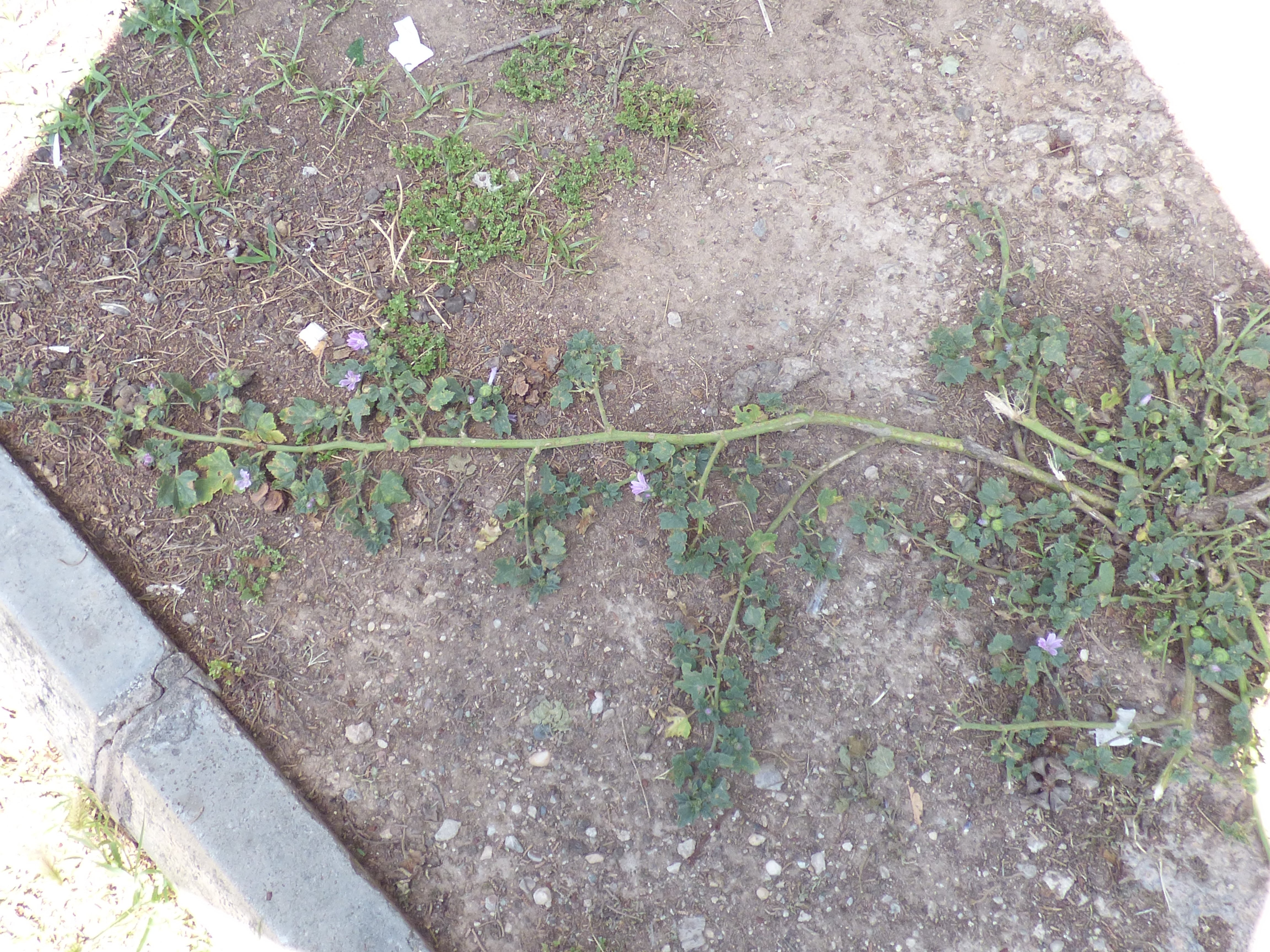
Trampled form, still showing a main stem

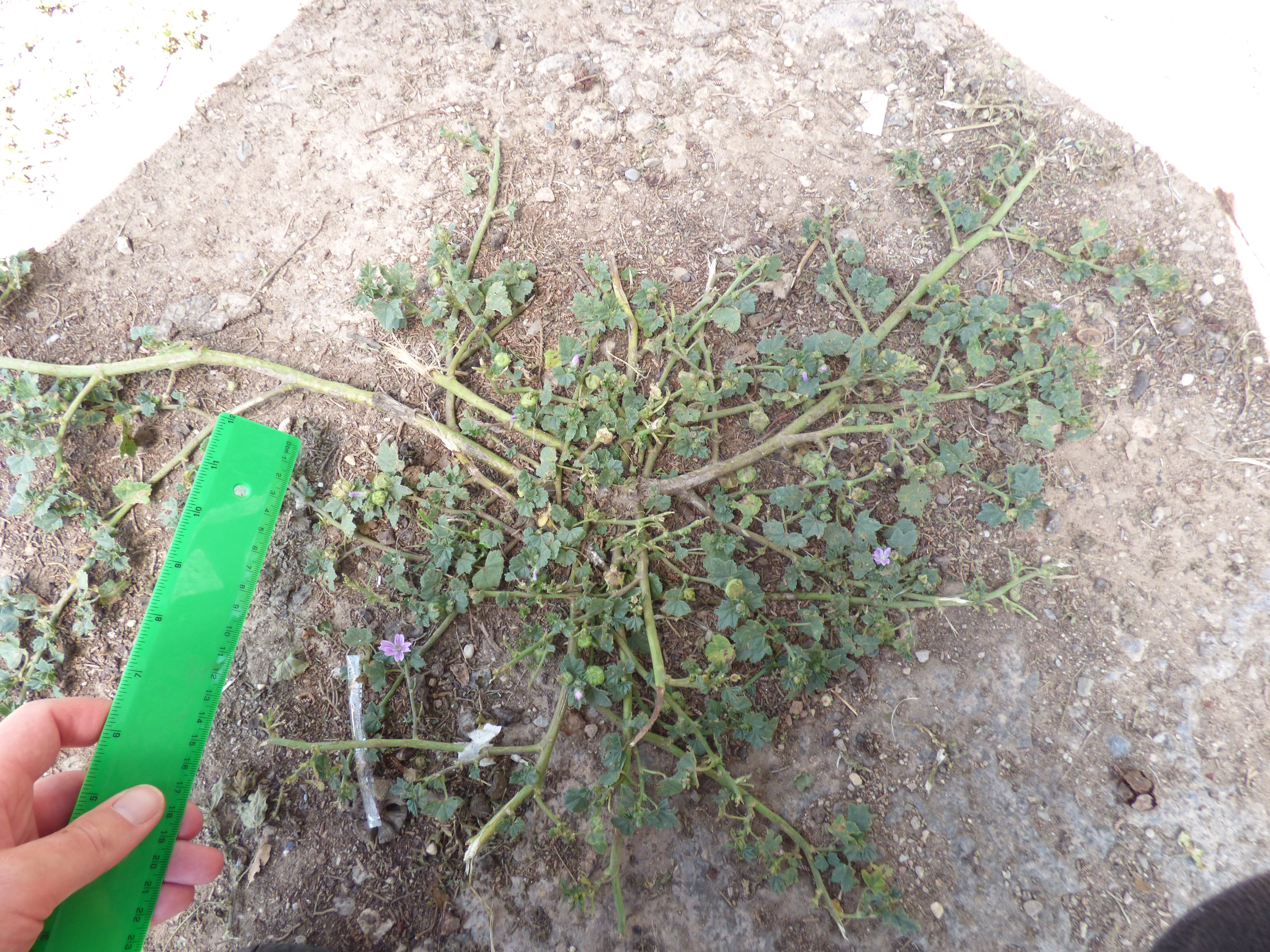
Trampled form, showing smaller leaves
