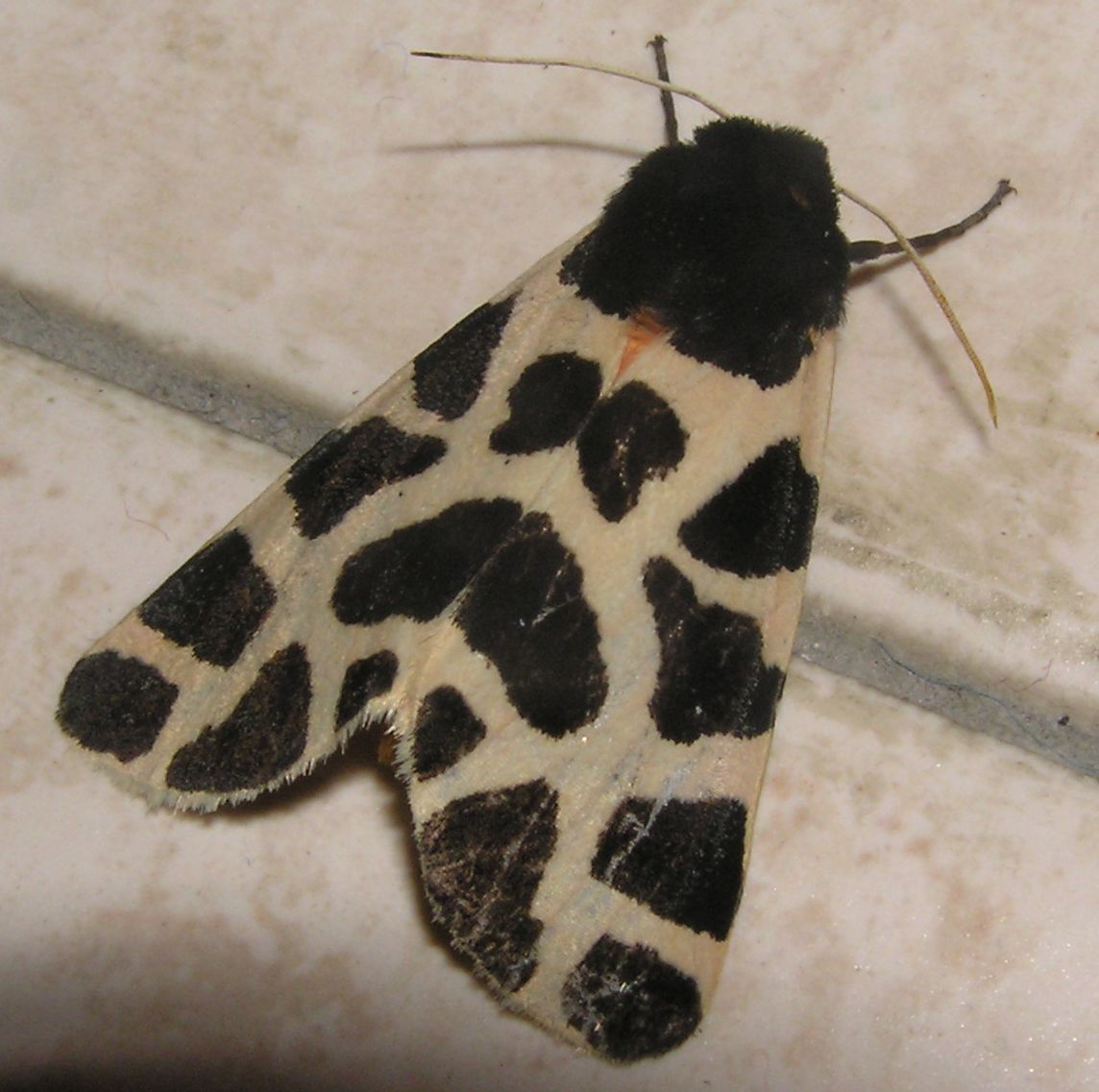

Scientific classification
- Kingdom: Animalia
- Phylum: Arthropoda
- Class: Insecta
- Order: Lepidoptera
- Superfamily: Noctuoidea
- Family: Erebidae
- Subfamily: Arctiinae
- Genus: Cymbalophora
- Species: C. oertzeni

Binomial name
- Cymbalophora oertzeni (Lederer, 1855)

Synonyms
- Arctia oertzeni Lederer, 1855; Euprepia oertzeni

= Cymbalophora oertzeni =

Species of moth

Cymbalophora oertzeni is a moth of the family Erebidae first described by Julius Lederer in 1855. It is found in Lebanon, Israel, and Palestine.

== Gallery ==
Male: dorsal and ventral views

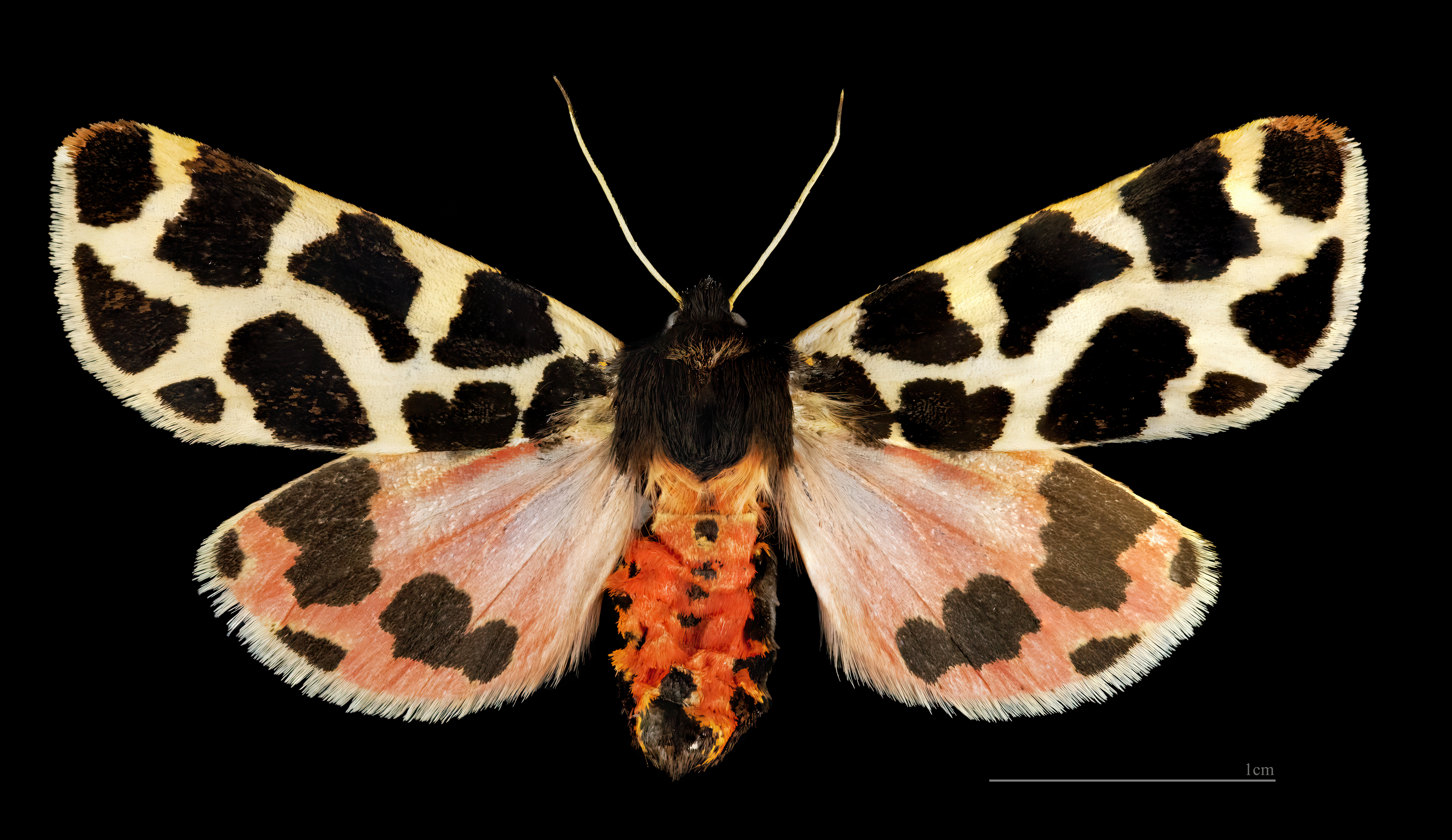
♂ (dorsal)

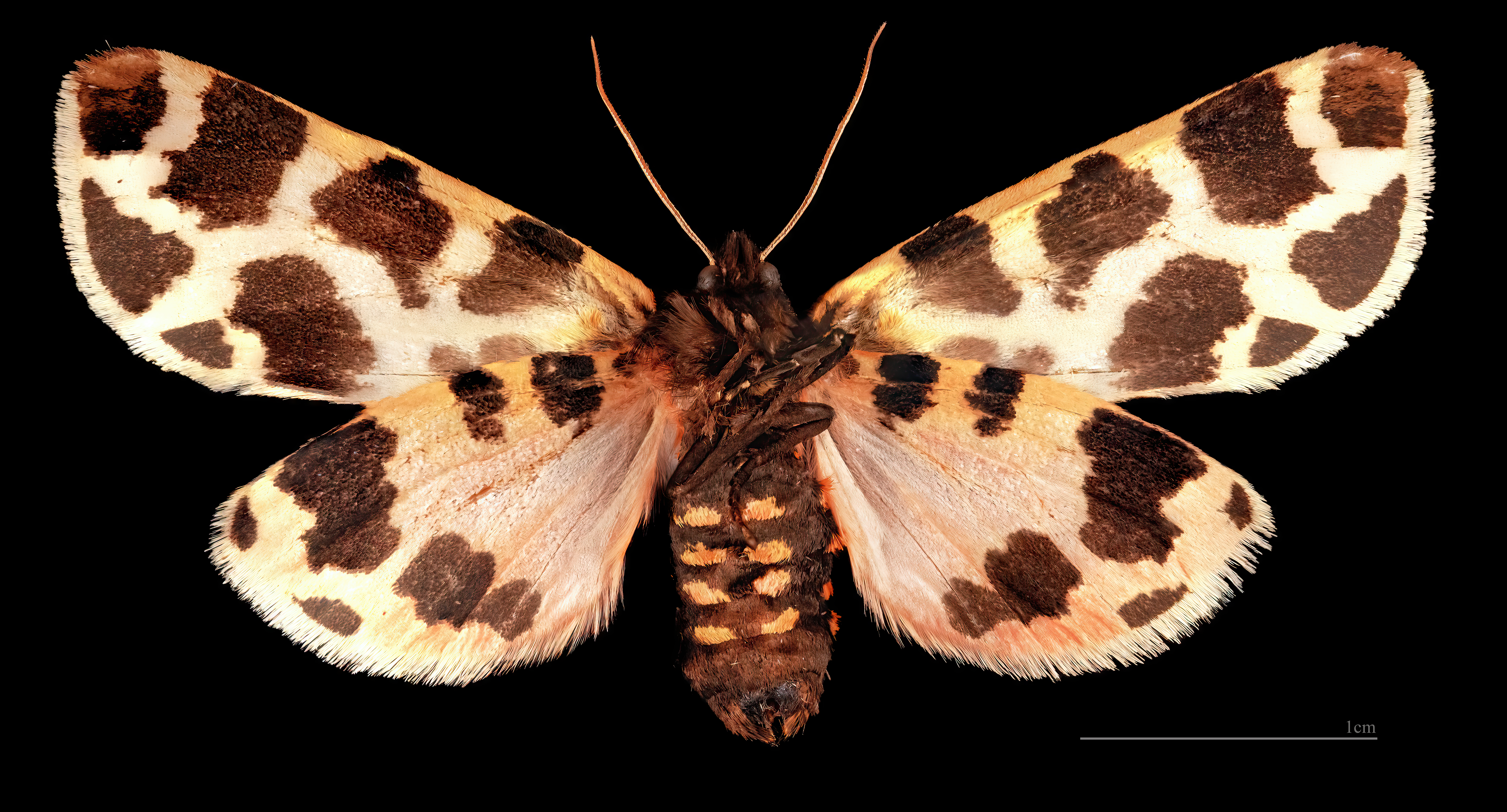
♂ △ (ventral)

== See also ==
- Biodiversity of Israel and Palestine
- Wildlife of Lebanon
