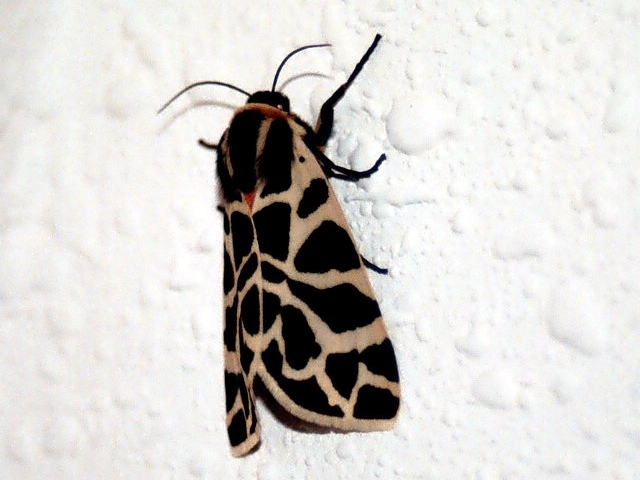

Scientific classification
- Kingdom: Animalia
- Phylum: Arthropoda
- Clade: Pancrustacea
- Class: Insecta
- Order: Lepidoptera
- Superfamily: Noctuoidea
- Family: Erebidae
- Subfamily: Arctiinae
- Genus: Cymbalophora
- Species: C. pudica

Binomial name
- Cymbalophora pudica (Esper, 1784)

Synonyms
- Phalaena (Bombyx) pudica Esper, 1785; Noctua tesselata de Villers, 1789; ulmi de Villers, 1789; bayardi Le Charles, 1922; Euprepia (Cymbalophora) pudica rosina Zerny, 1927; Cymbalophora pudica f. nigerrima Turati, 1919

= Cymbalophora pudica =

Species of moth

Cymbalophora pudica, the discrete chaperon, is a moth of the family Erebidae. The species was first described by Eugenius Johann Christoph Esper in 1784.

== Varieties ==
- Cymbalophora pudica ab. cohaerens Schultz, 1905
- Cymbalophora pudica ab. flaveola Schultz, 1906
- Cymbalophora pudica ab. flavescens Oberthür, 1911
- Cymbalophora pudica ab. fumosa Oberthür, 1911
- Cymbalophora pudica magnifica Rothschild, 1914

== Distribution ==
Cymbalophora pudica can be found in southern Europe from the Iberian Peninsula to Greece and in western North Africa. These moths prefer sunny, rocky areas, grasslands, scrublands and mountain slopes at low to middle elevations.

== Description ==
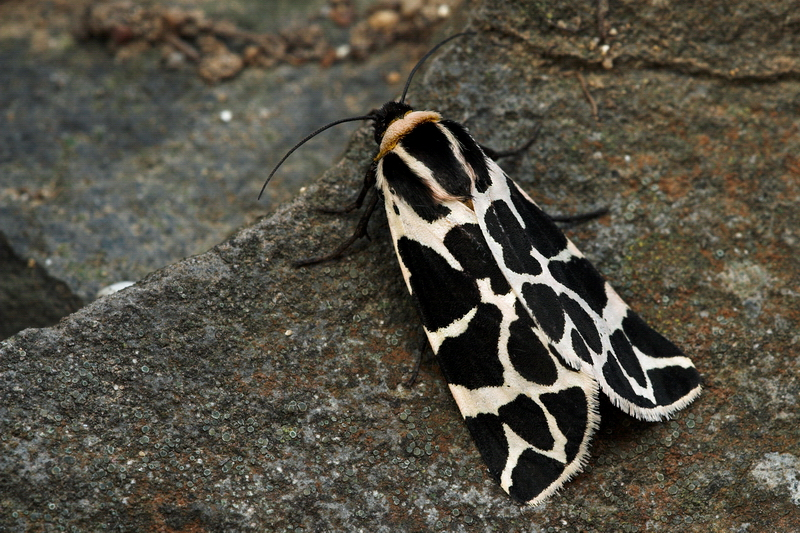

The wingspan of Cymbalophora pudica is typically 35–42 mm in males and 37–42 mm in females. The background color of the wings and the shape of their markings are rather variable. The external surface of the forewings usually may be milky white or pinkish, with a pattern of black triangular patches. Hindwings vary from white to pinkish with marginal spots. The blackish-haired thorax is characterized by two yellowish longitudinal stripes and by a broad, yellowish cervical spine. The antennae of the males are ciliated (hairy), while those of the females are filiform (thread like). The abdomen is reddish with black spots.

The wings may be shaded with yellowish in Cymbalophora f. flaveola Schultz, 1906, in gray in Cymbalophora f. fumosa Oberthür, 1911. Cymbalophora f. Cohaerens Schultz, 1905 shows confluent spots. Very pink forms are called rosina. The caterpillars are gray brown, hairy, and covered with black-brown warts on each segment.

Like other species of the genus Cymbalophora ("cymbal bearers"), males are capable of emitting sounds from their wings during flight.

Cymbalophora pudica preyed upon by the rove beetle Ocypus olens

== Biology ==
This species is univoltine. Caterpillars can be found from May to June. Then they construct their cocoons and rest a long time in the cocoon prior to pupation. The moths are on wing from August to September, depending on the location. The larvae feed on Taraxacum officinale, Stipa species, Brachypodium phoenicoides, Festuca species, various grasses (Poaceae) and other low growing plants.
