= List of Malvales of South Africa =

Flowering plants in the order Malvales recorded from South Africa

Malvales is an order of flowering plants. As circumscribed by APG II-system, the order includes about 6000 species within 9 families. The order is placed in the eurosids II, which are part of the eudicots. The plants are mostly shrubs and trees; most of its families have a cosmopolitan distribution in the tropics and subtropics, with limited expansion into temperate regions. The morphology of Malvales is diverse, with few common characteristics. Among those most commonly encountered are palmate leaves, connate sepals, and a specific structure and chemical composition of the seeds. The cortex is often fibrous, built of soft phloem layers.

The anthophytes are a grouping of plant taxa bearing flower-like reproductive structures. They were formerly thought to be a clade comprising plants bearing flower-like structures. The group contained the angiosperms - the extant flowering plants, such as roses and grasses - as well as the Gnetales and the extinct Bennettitales.

23,420 species of vascular plant have been recorded in South Africa, making it the sixth most species-rich country in the world and the most species-rich country on the African continent. Of these, 153 species are considered to be threatened. Nine biomes have been described in South Africa: Fynbos, Succulent Karoo, desert, Nama Karoo, grassland, savanna, Albany thickets, the Indian Ocean coastal belt, and forests.

The 2018 South African National Biodiversity Institute's National Biodiversity Assessment plant checklist lists 35,130 taxa in the phyla Anthocerotophyta (hornworts (6)), Anthophyta (flowering plants (33534)), Bryophyta (mosses (685)), Cycadophyta (cycads (42)), Lycopodiophyta (Lycophytes(45)), Marchantiophyta (liverworts (376)), Pinophyta (conifers (33)), and Pteridophyta (cryptogams (408)).

Six families are represented in the literature. Listed taxa include species, subspecies, varieties, and forms as recorded, some of which have subsequently been allocated to other taxa as synonyms, in which cases the accepted taxon is appended to the listing. Multiple entries under alternative names reflect taxonomic revision over time.

== Balanophoraceae ==
- Family: Balanophoraceae,

=== Mystropetalon ===
Genus Mystropetalon:

- Mystropetalon thomii Harv. endemic

=== Sarcophyte ===
Genus Sarcophyte:

- Sarcophyte sanguinea Sparrm. indigenous
  - Sarcophyte sanguinea Sparrm. subsp. sanguinea, indigenous

== Cistaceae ==
- Family: Cistaceae,

=== Cistus ===
Genus Cistus:

- Cistus ladanifer L. not indigenous, cultivated, naturalised

== Cytinaceae ==
- Family: Cytinaceae,

=== Cytinus ===
Genus Cytinus:

- Cytinus capensis Marloth, endemic
- Cytinus sanguineus (Thunb.) Fourc. endemic
- Cytinus visseri Burgoyne, indigenous

== Malvaceae ==
- Family: Malvaceae,

=== Abelmoschus ===
Genus Abelmoschus:

- Abelmoschus esculentus (L.) Moench var. esculentus, not indigenous, naturalised

=== Abutilon ===
Genus Abutilon:

- Abutilon angulatum (Guill. & Perr.) Mast. indigenous
  - Abutilon angulatum (Guill. & Perr.) Mast. var. angulatum, indigenous
  - Abutilon angulatum (Guill. & Perr.) Mast. var. macrophyllum (Baker f.) Hochr. indigenous
- Abutilon austro-africanum Hochr. indigenous
- Abutilon dinteri Ulbr. indigenous
- Abutilon englerianum Ulbr. indigenous
- Abutilon flanaganii A.Meeuse, endemic
- Abutilon fruticosum Guill. & Perr. indigenous
- Abutilon galpinii A.Meeuse, indigenous
- Abutilon grandiflorum G.Don, indigenous
- Abutilon grandifolium (Willd.) Sweet, endemic
- Abutilon grantii A.Meeuse, indigenous
- Abutilon guineense (Schumach.) Baker f. & Exell, indigenous
- Abutilon hirtum (Lam.) Sweet, indigenous
  - Abutilon hirtum (Lam.) Sweet var. hirtum, indigenous
- Abutilon lauraster Hochr. indigenous
- Abutilon mauritianum (Jacq.) Medik. indigenous
- Abutilon mendoncae Baker f. accepted as Abutilon pycnodon Hochr. present
- Abutilon pictum (Gillies ex Hook. & Arn.) Walp. not indigenous, cultivated, naturalised
- Abutilon piloso-cinereum A.Meeuse, indigenous
- Abutilon pycnodon Hochr. indigenous
- Abutilon ramosum (Cav.) Guill. & Perr. indigenous
- Abutilon rehmannii Baker f. indigenous
- Abutilon sonneratianum (Cav.) Sweet, indigenous
- Abutilon theophrasti Medik. not indigenous, naturalised

=== Adansonia ===
Genus Adansonia:

- Adansonia digitata L. indigenous
- Adansonia kilima Pettigrew, K.L.Bell, Bhagw. Grinan, Jillani, Jean Mey. Wabuyele & C.E.Vickers, accepted as Adansonia digitata L. indigenous

=== Althaea ===
Genus Althea:

- Althaea ludwigii L. indigenous

=== Anisodontea ===
Genus Anisodontea:

- Anisodontea alexandri (Baker f.) Bates, endemic
- Anisodontea anomala (Link & Otto) Bates, endemic
- Anisodontea biflora (Desr.) Bates, endemic
- Anisodontea bryoniifolia (L.) Bates, endemic
- Anisodontea capensis (L.) Bates, endemic
- Anisodontea dissecta (Harv.) Bates, endemic
- Anisodontea elegans (Cav.) Bates, endemic
- Anisodontea fruticosa (P.J.Bergius) Bates, endemic
- Anisodontea gracilis Bates, endemic
- Anisodontea julii (Burch. ex DC.) Bates, indigenous
  - Anisodontea julii (Burch. ex DC.) Bates subsp. julii, indigenous
  - Anisodontea julii (Burch. ex DC.) Bates subsp. pannosa (Bolus) Bates, endemic
  - Anisodontea julii (Burch. ex DC.) Bates subsp. prostrata (E.Mey. ex Turcz.) Bates, indigenous
- Anisodontea malvastroides (Baker f.) Bates, endemic
- Anisodontea procumbens (Harv.) Bates, endemic
- Anisodontea pseudocapensis Bates, endemic
- Anisodontea racemosa (Harv.) Bates, endemic
- Anisodontea reflexa (J.C.Wendl.) Bates, endemic
- Anisodontea scabrosa (L.) Bates, endemic
- Anisodontea setosa (Harv.) Bates, endemic
- Anisodontea theronii Bates, endemic
- Anisodontea triloba (Thunb.) Bates, endemic

=== Anoda ===
Genus Anoda:

- Anoda cristata (L.) Schltdl. not indigenous, naturalised

=== Azanza ===
Genus Azanza:

- Azanza garckeana (F.Hoffm.) Exell & Hillc. indigenous

=== Brachychiton ===
Genus Brachychiton:

- Brachychiton populneus (Schott & Endl.) R.Br. not indigenous, naturalised

=== Cienfuegosia ===
Genus Cienfuegosia:

- Cienfuegosia digitata Cav. indigenous
- Cienfuegosia gerrardii (Harv.) Hochr. indigenous
- Cienfuegosia hildebrandtii Garcke, indigenous

=== Cola ===
Genus Cola:

- Cola greenwayi Brenan, indigenous
  - Cola greenwayi Brenan var. greenwayi, indigenous
- Cola natalensis Oliv. indigenous

=== Corchorus ===
Genus Corchorus:

- Corchorus argillicola M.J.Moeaha & P.J.D.Winter, indigenous
- Corchorus asplenifolius Burch. indigenous
- Corchorus confusus Wild, indigenous
- Corchorus junodii (Schinz) N.E.Br. indigenous
- Corchorus kirkii N.E.Br. indigenous
- Corchorus longipedunculatus Mast. indigenous
- Corchorus olitorius L. not indigenous, naturalised
  - Corchorus olitorius L. var. olitorius, not indigenous, naturalised
- Corchorus pinnatipartitus Wild, indigenous
- Corchorus psammophilus Codd, indigenous
- Corchorus schimperi Cufod. indigenous
- Corchorus sulcatus I.Verd. endemic
- Corchorus tridens L. not indigenous, naturalised
- Corchorus trilocularis L. not indigenous, cultivated, naturalised
- Corchorus velutinus Wild, indigenous

=== Dombeya ===
Genus Dombeya:

- Dombeya autumnalis I.Verd. endemic
- Dombeya burgessiae Gerrard ex Harv. indigenous
- Dombeya cymosa Harv. indigenous
- Dombeya kirkii Mast. indigenous
- Dombeya pulchra N.E.Br. indigenous
- Dombeya rotundifolia (Hochst.) Planch. var. rotundifolia, indigenous
- Dombeya tiliacea (Endl.) Planch. endemic

=== Gossypioides ===
Genus Gossypioides:

- Gossypioides kirkii (Mast.) J.B.Hutch. indigenous

=== Gossypium ===
Genus Gossypium:

- Gossypium herbaceum L. indigenous
  - Gossypium herbaceum L. subsp. africanum (Watt) Vollesen, indigenous

=== Grewia ===
Genus Grewia:

- Grewia afra Meisn. indigenous
- Grewia avellana Hiern, indigenous
- Grewia bicolor Juss. indigenous
  - Grewia bicolor Juss. var. bicolor, indigenous
- Grewia flava DC. indigenous
- Grewia flavescens Juss. indigenous
  - Grewia flavescens Juss. var. olukondae (Schinz) Wild, accepted as Grewia olukondae Schinz, indigenous
- Grewia gracillima Wild, indigenous
- Grewia hexamita Burret, indigenous
- Grewia hispida Harv. endemic
- Grewia hornbyi Wild, indigenous
- Grewia inaequilatera Garcke, indigenous
- Grewia lasiocarpa E.Mey. ex Harv. endemic
- Grewia microthyrsa K.Schum. ex Burret, indigenous
- Grewia monticola Sond. indigenous
- Grewia occidentalis L. indigenous
  - Grewia occidentalis L. var. occidentalis, indigenous
- Grewia olukondae Schinz, indigenous
- Grewia pondoensis Burret, endemic
- Grewia retinervis Burret, indigenous
- Grewia robusta Burch. endemic
- Grewia rogersii Burtt Davy & Greenway, endemic
- Grewia subspathulata N.E.Br. indigenous
- Grewia sulcata Mast. indigenous
  - Grewia sulcata Mast. var. sulcata, indigenous
- Grewia tenax (Forssk.) Fiori, indigenous
  - Grewia tenax (Forssk.) Fiori var. tenax, accepted as Grewia tenax (Forssk.) Fiori, indigenous
- Grewia vernicosa Schinz, endemic
- Grewia villosa Willd. indigenous
  - Grewia villosa Willd. var. villosa, indigenous

=== Hermannia ===
Genus Hermannia:

- Hermannia abrotanoides Schrad. indigenous
- Hermannia affinis K.Schum. indigenous
- Hermannia alnifolia L. endemic
- Hermannia althaeifolia L. endemic
- Hermannia althaeoides Link, endemic
- Hermannia amoena Dinter ex Friedr.-Holzh. indigenous
- Hermannia angularis Jacq. endemic
- Hermannia antonii I.Verd. endemic
- Hermannia aspera J.C.Wendl. endemic
- Hermannia auricoma (Szyszyl.) K.Schum. indigenous
- Hermannia bicolor Engl. & Dinter, indigenous
- Hermannia boraginiflora Hook. indigenous
- Hermannia brachymalla K.Schum. endemic
- Hermannia bryoniifolia Burch. endemic
- Hermannia burchellii (Sweet) I.Verd. indigenous
- Hermannia burkei Burtt Davy, indigenous
- Hermannia cernua Thunb. indigenous
- Hermannia coccocarpa (Eckl. & Zeyh.) Kuntze, indigenous
- Hermannia comosa Burch. ex DC. indigenous
- Hermannia concinnifolia I.Verd. endemic
- Hermannia confusa T.M.Salter, endemic
- Hermannia conglomerata Eckl. & Zeyh. endemic
- Hermannia cordata (E.Mey. ex E.Phillips) De Winter, endemic
- Hermannia cordifolia Harv. endemic
- Hermannia cristata Bolus, indigenous
- Hermannia cuneifolia Jacq. indigenous
  - Hermannia cuneifolia Jacq. var. cuneifolia, indigenous
  - Hermannia cuneifolia Jacq. var. glabrescens (Harv.) I.Verd. indigenous
- Hermannia damarana Baker f. indigenous
- Hermannia decipiens E.Mey. ex Harv. endemic
- Hermannia decumbens Willd. ex Spreng. endemic
- Hermannia denudata L.f. indigenous
  - Hermannia denudata L.f. var. denudata, endemic
  - Hermannia denudata L.f. var. erecta (N.E.Br.) Burtt Davy & Greenway, endemic
- Hermannia depressa N.E.Br. indigenous
- Hermannia desertorum Eckl. & Zeyh. indigenous
- Hermannia diffusa L.f. indigenous
- Hermannia disermifolia Jacq. indigenous
- Hermannia disticha Schrad. endemic
- Hermannia diversistipula C.Presl ex Harv. indigenous
  - Hermannia diversistipula C.Presl ex Harv. var. diversistipula, indigenous
  - Hermannia diversistipula C.Presl ex Harv. var. graciliflora I.Verd. endemic
- Hermannia eenii Baker f. indigenous
- Hermannia ernesti-ruschii Dinter ex Friedr.-Holzh. indigenous
- Hermannia erodioides (Burch. ex DC.) Kuntze, indigenous
- Hermannia filifolia L.f. indigenous
  - Hermannia filifolia L.f. var. filifolia, endemic
  - Hermannia filifolia L.f. var. grandicalyx I.Verd. endemic
  - Hermannia filifolia L.f. var. robusta I.Verd. endemic
- Hermannia flammea Jacq. endemic
- Hermannia flammula Harv. endemic
- Hermannia floribunda Harv. indigenous
- Hermannia fruticulosa K.Schum. indigenous
- Hermannia gariepina Eckl. & Zeyh. indigenous
- Hermannia geniculata Eckl. & Zeyh. indigenous
- Hermannia gerrardii Harv. indigenous
- Hermannia glabrata L.f. endemic
- Hermannia glanduligera K.Schum. indigenous
- Hermannia gracilis Eckl. & Zeyh. endemic
- Hermannia grandiflora Aiton, indigenous
- Hermannia grandifolia N.E.Br. indigenous
- Hermannia grandistipula (Buchinger ex Hochst.) K.Schum. indigenous
- Hermannia grisea Schinz, endemic
- Hermannia grossularifolia L. endemic
- Hermannia helianthemum K.Schum. indigenous
- Hermannia helicoidea I.Verd. endemic
- Hermannia heterophylla (Cav.) Thunb. endemic
- Hermannia hispidula Rchb.f. endemic
- Hermannia holosericea Jacq. endemic
- Hermannia hyssopifolia L. endemic
- Hermannia incana Cav. endemic
- Hermannia involucrata Cav. endemic
- Hermannia jacobeifolia (Turcz.) R.A.Dyer, indigenous
- Hermannia johanssenii N.E.Br. endemic
- Hermannia joubertiana Harv. endemic
- Hermannia lacera (E.Mey. ex Harv.) Fourc. endemic
- Hermannia lancifolia Szyszyl. endemic
- Hermannia lavandulifolia L. endemic
- Hermannia leucantha Schltdl. indigenous
- Hermannia linearifolia Harv. endemic
- Hermannia linifolia Burm.f. endemic
- Hermannia linnaeoides (Burch.) K.Schum. indigenous
- Hermannia litoralis I.Verd. endemic
- Hermannia macra Schltr. indigenous
- Hermannia malvifolia N.E.Br. endemic
- Hermannia marginata (Turcz.) Pillans, endemic
- Hermannia micrantha Adamson, endemic
- Hermannia micropetala Harv. indigenous
- Hermannia minutiflora Engl. indigenous
- Hermannia modesta (Ehrenb.) Mast. indigenous
- Hermannia montana N.E.Br. endemic
- Hermannia mucronulata Turcz. endemic
- Hermannia muirii Pillans, endemic
- Hermannia multiflora Jacq. endemic
- Hermannia muricata Eckl. & Zeyh. endemic
- Hermannia nana (Eckl. & Zeyh.) Hochr. indigenous
- Hermannia oblongifolia (Harv.) Hochr. endemic
- Hermannia odorata Aiton, endemic
- Hermannia oligosperma K.Schum. indigenous
- Hermannia parviflora Eckl. & Zeyh. indigenous
- Hermannia parvula Burtt Davy, indigenous
- Hermannia paucifolia Turcz. indigenous
- Hermannia pfeilii K.Schum. indigenous
- Hermannia pillansii Compton, endemic
- Hermannia pinnata L. endemic
- Hermannia prismatocarpa E.Mey. ex Harv. endemic
- Hermannia procumbens Cav. indigenous
  - Hermannia procumbens Cav. subsp. myrrhifolia (Thunb.) De Winter, endemic
  - Hermannia procumbens Cav. subsp. procumbens, endemic
- Hermannia pulchella L.f. indigenous
- Hermannia pulverata Andrews, endemic
- Hermannia quartiniana A.Rich. indigenous
- Hermannia rautanenii Schinz ex K.Schum. indigenous
- Hermannia repetenda I.Verd. endemic
- Hermannia rigida Harv. endemic
- Hermannia rudis N.E.Br. endemic
- Hermannia rugosa Adamson, endemic
- Hermannia saccifera (Turcz.) K.Schum. endemic
- Hermannia salviifolia L.f. indigenous
  - Hermannia salviifolia L.f. var. grandistipula Harv. endemic
  - Hermannia salviifolia L.f. var. oblonga Harv. endemic
  - Hermannia salviifolia L.f. var. salviifolia, endemic
- Hermannia sandersonii Harv. endemic
- Hermannia scabra Cav. endemic
- Hermannia scabricaulis T.M.Salter, endemic
- Hermannia schlechteriana Schinz ex K.Schum. endemic
- Hermannia scordifolia Jacq. endemic
- Hermannia sisymbriifolia (Turcz.) Hochr. endemic
- Hermannia solaniflora K.Schum. indigenous
- Hermannia spinosa E.Mey. ex Harv. indigenous
- Hermannia staurostemon K.Schum. indigenous
- Hermannia stellulata (Harv.) K.Schum. indigenous
- Hermannia stipitata Pillans, indigenous
- Hermannia stipulacea Lehm. ex Eckl. & Zeyh. endemic
- Hermannia stricta (E.Mey. ex Turcz.) Harv. indigenous
- Hermannia suavis C.Presl ex Harv. endemic
- Hermannia sulcata Harv. endemic
- Hermannia ternifolia C.Presl ex Harv. endemic
- Hermannia tomentosa (Turcz.) Schinz ex Engl. indigenous
- Hermannia transvaalensis Schinz, endemic
- Hermannia trifoliata L. endemic
- Hermannia trifurca L. indigenous
- Hermannia umbratica I.Verd. endemic
- Hermannia velutina DC. indigenous
- Hermannia veronicifolia (Eckl. & Zeyh.) Hochr. endemic
- Hermannia vestita Thunb. indigenous
- Hermannia violacea (Burch. ex DC.) K.Schum. endemic
- Hermannia woodii Schinz, indigenous

=== Hibiscus ===
Genus Hibiscus:

- Hibiscus aethiopicus L. indigenous
  - Hibiscus aethiopicus L. var. aethiopicus, indigenous
  - Hibiscus aethiopicus L. var. angustifolius (Eckl. & Zeyh.) Exell, endemic
  - Hibiscus aethiopicus L. var. ovatus Harv. indigenous
- Hibiscus altissimus Hornby, indigenous
- Hibiscus aridus R.A.Dyer, endemic
- Hibiscus barbosae Exell, indigenous
- Hibiscus barnardii Exell, endemic
- Hibiscus caesius Garcke, indigenous
  - Hibiscus caesius Garcke var. caesius, indigenous
- Hibiscus calyphyllus Cav. indigenous
- Hibiscus cannabinus L. indigenous
- Hibiscus coddii Exell, endemic
  - Hibiscus coddii Exell subsp. barnardii (Exell) Leistner & P.J.D.Winter, indigenous
  - Hibiscus coddii Exell subsp. coddii, indigenous
- Hibiscus diversifolius Jacq. indigenous
  - Hibiscus diversifolius Jacq. subsp. diversifolius, indigenous
- Hibiscus dongolensis Delile, indigenous
- Hibiscus elliottiae Harv. indigenous
- Hibiscus engleri K.Schum. indigenous
- Hibiscus ficulneus Cav. accepted as Hibiscus diversifolius Jacq. subsp. diversifolius
- Hibiscus fleckii Gurke, indigenous
- Hibiscus fuscus Garcke, indigenous
- Hibiscus ludwigii Eckl. & Zeyh. indigenous
- Hibiscus lunarifolius Willd. indigenous
- Hibiscus marlothianus K.Schum. endemic
- Hibiscus mastersianus Hiern, not indigenous, naturalised
- Hibiscus meeusei Exell, accepted as Hibiscus nigricaulis Baker f. present
- Hibiscus meyeri Harv. indigenous
  - Hibiscus meyeri Harv. subsp. meyeri, indigenous
  - Hibiscus meyeri Harv. subsp. transvaalensis (Exell) Exell, endemic
- Hibiscus micranthus L.f. indigenous
  - Hibiscus micranthus L.f. var. micranthus, indigenous
- Hibiscus microcarpus Garcke, indigenous
- Hibiscus mutabilis L. not indigenous, naturalised
- Hibiscus mutatus N.E.Br. indigenous
- Hibiscus nigricaulis Baker f. indigenous
- Hibiscus palmatus Forssk. indigenous
- Hibiscus pedunculatus L.f. indigenous
- Hibiscus physaloides Guill. & Perr. indigenous
- Hibiscus platycalyx Mast. indigenous
- Hibiscus praeteritus R.A.Dyer, indigenous
- Hibiscus pusillus Thunb. indigenous
- Hibiscus sabdariffa L. [1], not indigenous, naturalised
- Hibiscus sabiensis Exell, indigenous
- Hibiscus saxatilis J.M.Wood & M.S.Evans, indigenous
- Hibiscus schinzii Gurke [2], indigenous
- Hibiscus sidiformis Baill. indigenous
- Hibiscus subreniformis Burtt Davy, indigenous
- Hibiscus surattensis L. indigenous
- Hibiscus syriaca L. not indigenous, naturalised
- Hibiscus tiliaceus L. indigenous
  - Hibiscus tiliaceus L. subsp. tiliaceus, indigenous
- Hibiscus trionum L. not indigenous, naturalised
- Hibiscus upingtoniae Gurke, indigenous
- Hibiscus vitifolius L. indigenous
  - Hibiscus vitifolius L. subsp. vitifolius, indigenous
  - Hibiscus vitifolius L. subsp. vulgaris Brenan & Exell, indigenous
- Hibiscus waterbergensis Exell, endemic

=== Lagunaria ===
Genus Lagunaria:

- Lagunaria patersonia (Andrews) G.Don, not indigenous, naturalised

=== Lavatera ===
Genus Lavatera:

- Lavatera arborea L. accepted as Malva arborea (L.) Webb & Berthel. [1], not indigenous, naturalised
- Lavatera assurgentiflora Kellogg, accepted as Malva assurgentiflora (Kellogg) M.F.Ray, not indigenous, naturalised
- Lavatera cretica L. accepted as Malva multiflora (Cav.) Soldano, Banfi & Gallaso, not indigenous, naturalised
- Lavatera trimestris L. not indigenous, naturalised

=== Malva ===
Genus Malva:

- Malva aegyptia L. not indigenous, naturalised
- Malva arborea (L.) Webb & Berthel. [1], not indigenous, naturalised, invasive
- Malva dendromorpha M.F.Ray, accepted as Malva arborea (L.) Webb & Berthel. [1], not indigenous, naturalised, invasive
- Malva multiflora (Cav.) Soldano, Banfi & Gallaso, not indigenous, naturalised, invasive
- Malva neglecta Wallr. not indigenous, naturalised
- Malva parviflora L. not indigenous, naturalised
  - Malva parviflora L. var. parviflora, not indigenous, naturalised
- Malva pseudolavatera M.F.Ray, accepted as Malva multiflora (Cav.) Soldano, Banfi & Gallaso
- Malva pusilla Sm. not indigenous, naturalised
- Malva sylvestris L. not indigenous, naturalised
- Malva verticillata L. not indigenous, naturalised, invasive
  - Malva verticillata L. var. crispa L. not indigenous, naturalised
  - Malva verticillata L. var. verticillata, not indigenous, naturalised

=== Malvastrum ===
Genus Malvastrum:

- Malvastrum coromandelianum (L.) Garcke, not indigenous, naturalised, invasive

=== Malvaviscus ===
Genus Malvaviscus:

- Malvaviscus penduliflorus Sesse & MoÃ§. ex DC. not indigenous, cultivated, naturalised, invasive

=== Melhania ===
Genus Melhania:

- Melhania acuminata Mast. indigenous
  - Melhania acuminata Mast. var. acuminata, indigenous
  - Melhania acuminata Mast. var. agnosta (K.Schum.) Wild, indigenous
- Melhania burchellii DC. indigenous
- Melhania damarana Harv. indigenous
- Melhania didyma Eckl. & Zeyh. indigenous
- Melhania forbesii Planch. ex Mast. indigenous
- Melhania integra I.Verd. endemic
- Melhania polygama I.Verd. endemic
- Melhania prostrata DC. indigenous
- Melhania randii Baker f. indigenous
- Melhania rehmannii Szyszyl. indigenous
- Melhania suluensis Gerstner, indigenous
- Melhania transvaalensis Szyszyl. endemic
- Melhania virescens (K.Schum.) K.Schum. indigenous

=== Modiola ===
Genus Modiola:

- Modiola caroliniana (L.) G.Don, not indigenous, naturalised

=== Pavonia ===
Genus Pavonia:

- Pavonia burchellii (DC.) R.A.Dyer, indigenous
- Pavonia clathrata Mast. indigenous
- Pavonia columella Cav. indigenous
- Pavonia dentata Burtt Davy, endemic
- Pavonia dregei Garcke, endemic
- Pavonia elegans Garcke, endemic
- Pavonia leptocalyx (Sond.) Ulbr. indigenous
- Pavonia praemorsa (L.f.) Cav. endemic
- Pavonia senegalensis (Cav.) Leistner, indigenous
- Pavonia transvaalensis (Ulbr.) A.Meeuse, endemic
- Pavonia urens Cav. indigenous
  - Pavonia urens Cav. var. urens, endemic

=== Radyera ===
Genus Radyera:

- Radyera urens (L.f.) Bullock, indigenous

=== Sida ===
Genus Sida:

- Sida acuta Burm.f. indigenous
  - Sida acuta Burm.f. subsp. acuta, indigenous
- Sida alba L. indigenous
- Sida chrysantha Ulbr. indigenous
- Sida cordifolia L. indigenous
  - Sida cordifolia L. subsp. cordifolia, indigenous
- Sida dregei Burtt Davy, indigenous
- Sida ovata Forssk. indigenous
- Sida pseudocordifolia Hochr. indigenous
- Sida rhombifolia L. indigenous
  - Sida rhombifolia L. subsp. rhombifolia, indigenous
- Sida serratifolia R.Wilczek & Steyaert, indigenous
- Sida spinosa L. indigenous
- Sida spinosa L. var. spinosa, indigenous
- Sida ternata L.f. indigenous

=== Sparrmannia ===
Genus Sparrmannia:

- Sparrmannia africana L.f. endemic
- Sparrmannia ricinocarpa (Eckl. & Zeyh.) Kuntze, indigenous

=== Sphaeralcea ===
Genus Sphaeralcea:

- Sphaeralcea bonariensis (Cav.) Griseb. not indigenous, naturalised

=== Sterculia ===
Genus Sterculia:

- Sterculia alexandri Harv. endemic
- Sterculia murex Hemsl. endemic
- Sterculia rogersii N.E.Br. indigenous

=== Thespesia ===
Genus Thespesia:

- Thespesia acutiloba (Baker f.) Exell & MendonÃ§a, indigenous

=== Triumfetta ===
Genus Triumfetta:

- Triumfetta angolensis Sprague & Hutch. indigenous
- Triumfetta annua L. indigenous
  - Triumfetta annua L. forma annua, indigenous
  - Triumfetta annua L. forma piligera Sprague & Hutch. indigenous
- Triumfetta dekindtiana Engl. indigenous
- Triumfetta obtusicornis Sprague & Hutch. endemic
- Triumfetta pentandra A.Rich. indigenous
  - Triumfetta pentandra A.Rich. var. pentandra, indigenous
- Triumfetta pilosa Roth, indigenous
  - Triumfetta pilosa Roth var. effusa (E.Mey. ex Harv.) Wild, indigenous
  - Triumfetta pilosa Roth var. pilosa, endemic
  - Triumfetta pilosa Roth var. tomentosa Szyszyl. ex Sprague & Hutch. indigenous
- Triumfetta rhomboidea Jacq. indigenous
  - Triumfetta rhomboidea Jacq. var. rhomboidea, indigenous
- Triumfetta sonderi Ficalho & Hiern, endemic
- Triumfetta welwitschii Mast. indigenous
  - Triumfetta welwitschii Mast. var. hirsuta (Sprague & Hutch.) Wild, indigenous
  - Triumfetta welwitschii Mast. var. welwitschii, indigenous

=== Urena ===
Genus Urena:

- Urena lobata L. not indigenous, naturalised
  - Urena lobata L. subsp. lobata var. lobata, not indigenous, naturalised

=== Waltheria ===
Genus Waltheria:

- Waltheria indica L. indigenous

=== Wissadula ===
Genus Wissadula:

- Wissadula rostrata (Schumach.) Hook.f. indigenous

== Neuradaceae ==
- Family: Neuradaceae,

=== Grielum ===
Genus Grielum:

- Grielum cuneifolium Schinz, indigenous
- Grielum grandiflorum (L.) Druce, endemic
- Grielum humifusum Thunb. indigenous
  - Grielum humifusum Thunb. var. humifusum, indigenous
  - Grielum humifusum Thunb. var. parviflorum Harv. indigenous
- Grielum sinuatum Licht. ex Burch. indigenous

=== Neuradopsis ===
Genus Neuradopsis:

- Neuradopsis austro-africana (Schinz) Bremek. & Oberm. indigenous
- Neuradopsis bechuanensis Bremek. & Schweick. indigenous

== Thymelaeaceae ==
- Family: Thymelaeaceae,

=== Arthrosolen ===
Genus Arthrosolen:

- Arthrosolen calocephalus (Meisn.) C.A.Mey. accepted as Lasiosiphon calocephalus (Meisn.) Domke, indigenous
- Arthrosolen microcephalus (Meisn.) E.Phillips [2], accepted as Lasiosiphon microcephalus (Meisn.) J.C.Manning & Magee, indigenous

=== Cryptadenia ===
Genus Cryptadenia:

- breviflora Meisn. accepted as Lachnaea grandiflora (L.f.) Baill. present
- Cryptadenia filicaulis Meisn. accepted as Lachnaea filicaulis (Meisn.) Beyers, present
- Cryptadenia grandiflora (L.f.) Meisn. accepted as Lachnaea grandiflora (L.f.) Baill. present
- Cryptadenia laxa C.H.Wright, accepted as Lachnaea laxa (C.H.Wright) Beyers, present
- Cryptadenia uniflora (L.) Meisn. accepted as Lachnaea uniflora (L.) Crantz, present

=== Dais ===
Genus Dais:

- Dais cotinifolia L. indigenous

=== Englerodaphne ===
Genus Englerodaphne:

- Englerodaphne ovalifolia (Meisn.) E.Phillips, indigenous
- Englerodaphne pilosa Burtt Davy, endemic
- Englerodaphne subcordata (Meisn.) Engl. indigenous

=== Gnidia ===
Genus Gnidia:

- Gnidia aberrans C.H.Wright, indigenous
- Gnidia albosericea Moss ex B.Peterson, accepted as Lasiosiphon ornatus Burtt Davy, indigenous
- Gnidia anomala Meisn. endemic
- Gnidia anthylloides (L.f.) Gilg, accepted as Lasiosiphon anthylloides (L.f.) Meisn. endemic
- Gnidia baurii C.H.Wright, endemic
- Gnidia burchellii (Meisn.) Gilg, accepted as Lasiosiphon burchellii Meisn. indigenous
- Gnidia burmannii Eckl. & Zeyh. ex Meisn. endemic
- Gnidia caffra (Meisn.) Gilg, accepted as Lasiosiphon caffer Meisn. indigenous
- Gnidia calocephala (Meisn.) Gilg, accepted as Lasiosiphon calocephalus (Meisn.) Domke, endemic
- Gnidia caniflora Meisn. endemic
- Gnidia canoargentea (C.H.Wright) Gilg, accepted as Lasiosiphon canoargenteus C.H.Wright, endemic
- Gnidia capitata L.f. accepted as Lasiosiphon capitatus (L.f.) Burtt Davy, indigenous
- Gnidia cayleyi C.H.Wright, endemic
- Gnidia chrysophylla Meisn. endemic
- Gnidia clavata Schinz, endemic
- Gnidia compacta (C.H.Wright) J.H.Ross, indigenous
- Gnidia conspicua Meisn. endemic
- Gnidia coriacea Meisn. endemic
- Gnidia cuneata Meisn. accepted as Lasiosiphon meisnerianus Endl. endemic
- Gnidia decurrens Meisn. endemic
- Gnidia denudata Lindl. endemic
- Gnidia deserticola Gilg, accepted as Lasiosiphon deserticola (Gilg) C.H.Wright, endemic
- Gnidia dregeana Meisn. accepted as Lasiosiphon dregeanus (Meisn.) Endl. endemic
- Gnidia ericoides C.H.Wright, endemic
- Gnidia fastigiata Rendle, indigenous
- Gnidia flanaganii C.H.Wright, endemic
- Gnidia francisci Bolus, endemic
- Gnidia fraterna (N.E.Br.) E.Phillips, endemic
- Gnidia galpinii C.H.Wright, endemic
- Gnidia geminiflora E.Mey. ex Meisn. endemic
- Gnidia gymnostachya (C.A.Mey.) Gilg, indigenous
- Gnidia harveyiana Meisn. endemic
- Gnidia humilis Meisn. endemic
- Gnidia imbricata L.f. endemic
- Gnidia inconspicua Meisn. endemic
- Gnidia insignis Compton, endemic
- Gnidia juniperifolia Lam. endemic
- Gnidia kraussiana Meisn. accepted as Lasiosiphon kraussianus (Meisn.) Meisn. [1], indigenous
- Gnidia laxa (L.f.) Gilg, endemic
- Gnidia leipoldtii C.H.Wright, endemic
- Gnidia linearifolia (Wikstr.) B.Peterson, endemic
- Gnidia linoides Wikstr. endemic
- Gnidia lucens Lam. endemic
- Gnidia macropetala Meisn. accepted as Lasiosiphon macropetalus (Meisn.) Meisn. endemic
- Gnidia meyeri Meisn. endemic
- Gnidia microcephala Meisn. accepted as Lasiosiphon microcephalus (Meisn.) J.C.Manning & Magee, indigenous
- Gnidia microphylla Meisn. accepted as Lasiosiphon microphyllus (Meisn.) Meisn. endemic
- Gnidia myrtifolia C.H.Wright, endemic
- Gnidia nana (L.f.) Wikstr. endemic
- Gnidia nitida Bolus, endemic
- Gnidia nodiflora Meisn. indigenous
- Gnidia obtusissima Meisn. endemic
- Gnidia oppositifolia L. endemic
- Gnidia orbiculata C.H.Wright, endemic
- Gnidia ornata (Meisn.) Gilg, endemic
- Gnidia pallida Meisn. endemic
- Gnidia parviflora Meisn. endemic
- Gnidia parvula Wolley-Dod, endemic
- Gnidia pedunculata Beyers, endemic
- Gnidia penicillata Licht. ex Meisn. endemic
- Gnidia phaeotricha Gilg, endemic
- Gnidia pinifolia L. endemic
- Gnidia polyantha Gilg, accepted as Lasiosiphon polyanthus (Gilg) C.H.Wright, endemic
- Gnidia polycephala (C.A.Mey.) Gilg, accepted as Lasiosiphon polycephalus (E.Mey. ex Meisn.) H.Pearson, indigenous
  - Gnidia polystachya P.J.Bergius var. congesta C.H.Wright, accepted as Gnidia squarrosa (L.) Druce, present
  - Gnidia polystachya P.J.Bergius var. polystachya, accepted as Gnidia squarrosa (L.) Druce, present
- Gnidia propinqua (Hilliard) B.Peterson, indigenous
- Gnidia pulchella Meisn. accepted as Lasiosiphon pulchellus (Meisn.) Decne. endemic
- Gnidia quadrifaria C.H.Wright, accepted as Gnidia styphelioides Meisn. present
- Gnidia racemosa Thunb. endemic
- Gnidia renniana Hilliard & B.L.Burtt, endemic
- Gnidia robusta B.Peterson, accepted as Lasiosiphon nanus Burtt Davy, indigenous
- Gnidia rubescens B.Peterson, accepted as Lasiosiphon rubescens (B.Peterson) J.C.Manning & Magee, indigenous
- Gnidia scabra Thunb. endemic
- Gnidia scabrida Meisn. endemic
- Gnidia sericea L. indigenous
  - Gnidia sericea L. var. hirsuta Meisn. endemic
  - Gnidia sericea L. var. sericea, endemic
- Gnidia sericocephala (Meisn.) Gilg ex Engl. indigenous
- Gnidia setosa Wikstr. endemic
- Gnidia similis C.H.Wright, endemic
- Gnidia simplex L. endemic
- Gnidia sonderiana Meisn. endemic
- Gnidia sparsiflora Bartl. ex Meisn. endemic
- Gnidia spicata (L.f.) Gilg, endemic
- Gnidia splendens Meisn. accepted as Lasiosiphon splendens (Meisn.) Endl. indigenous
- Gnidia squarrosa (L.) Druce, indigenous
- Gnidia stellatifolia Gand. endemic
- Gnidia strigillosa Meisn. endemic
- Gnidia styphelioides Meisn. endemic
- Gnidia suavissima Dinter, accepted as Lasiosiphon suavissimus (Dinter) Domke, indigenous
- Gnidia subcordata Meisn. accepted as Englerodaphne subcordata (Meisn.) Engl. indigenous
- Gnidia subulata Lam. endemic
- Gnidia tenella Meisn. endemic
- Gnidia thesioides Meisn. indigenous
  - Gnidia thesioides Meisn. var. condensata Meisn. endemic
  - Gnidia thesioides Meisn. var. laxa Meisn. endemic
  - Gnidia thesioides Meisn. var. thesioides, endemic
- Gnidia tomentosa L. endemic
- Gnidia triplinervis Meisn. accepted as Lasiosiphon triplinervis (Meisn.) Decne. endemic
- Gnidia variabilis (C.H.Wright) E.Phillips, endemic
- Gnidia variegata Gand. endemic
- Gnidia vesiculosa Eckl. & Zeyh. accepted as Gnidia ornata (Meisn.) Gilg, present
- Gnidia wikstroemiana Meisn. endemic
- Gnidia wilmsii (C.H.Wright) Engl. accepted as Lasiosiphon wilmsii C.H.Wright, endemic
- Gnidia woodii C.H.Wright, indigenous

=== Lachnaea ===
Genus Lachnaea:

- Lachnaea alpina (Eckl. & Zeyh.) Meisn. endemic
- Lachnaea ambigua Meisn. var. ambigua, accepted as Lachnaea nervosa (Thunb.) Meisn. present
  - Lachnaea ambigua Meisn. var. minor Meisn. accepted as Lachnaea nervosa (Thunb.) Meisn. present
- Lachnaea aurea (Eckl. & Zeyh.) Meisn. endemic
- Lachnaea axillaris Meisn. endemic
- Lachnaea burchellii Meisn. endemic
- Lachnaea buxifolia Lam. accepted as Lachnaea pomposa Beyers, present
- Lachnaea capitata (L.) Crantz, endemic
- Lachnaea densiflora Meisn. endemic
- Lachnaea diosmoides Meisn. endemic
  - Lachnaea diosmoides Meisn. var. tenella Meisn. accepted as Lachnaea diosmoides Meisn. present
- Lachnaea dubia Gand. accepted as Gnidia laxa (L.f.) Gilg, present
- Lachnaea elegans Compton, accepted as Lachnaea striata (Poir.) Meisn. present
- Lachnaea elsieae Beyers, endemic
- Lachnaea ericoides Meisn. endemic
- Lachnaea eriocephala L. endemic
- Lachnaea filamentosa Meisn. endemic
  - Lachnaea filamentosa Meisn. var. major Meisn. accepted as Lachnaea filamentosa Meisn. present
- Lachnaea filicaulis (Meisn.) Beyers, endemic
- Lachnaea funicaulis Schinz, endemic
- Lachnaea globulifera Meisn. indigenous
  - Lachnaea globulifera Meisn. subsp. globulifera, endemic
  - Lachnaea globulifera Meisn. subsp. incana Beyers, endemic
  - Lachnaea globulifera Meisn. var. coerulescens Eckl. & Zeyh. accepted as Lachnaea globulifera Meisn. subsp. incana Beyers, present
- Lachnaea glomerata Fourc. endemic
- Lachnaea gracilis Meisn. endemic
- Lachnaea grandiflora (L.f.) Baill. endemic
- Lachnaea greytonensis Beyers, endemic
- Lachnaea laniflora (C.H.Wright) Bond, endemic
- Lachnaea laxa (C.H.Wright) Beyers, endemic
- Lachnaea leipoldtii Beyers, endemic
- Lachnaea macrantha Meisn. endemic
- Lachnaea marlothii Schltr. endemic
- Lachnaea micrantha Schltr. accepted as Lachnaea axillaris Meisn. present
- Lachnaea montana Beyers, endemic
- Lachnaea naviculifolia Compton, endemic
- Lachnaea nervosa (Thunb.) Meisn. endemic
- Lachnaea oliverorum Beyers, endemic
- Lachnaea passerinoides N.E.Br. accepted as Lachnaea penicillata Meisn. present
- Lachnaea pedicellata Beyers, endemic
- Lachnaea pendula Beyers, endemic
- Lachnaea penicillata Meisn. endemic
- Lachnaea pomposa Beyers, endemic
- Lachnaea pudens Beyers, endemic
- Lachnaea purpurea Andrews, accepted as Lachnaea eriocephala L. present
- Lachnaea pusilla Beyers, endemic
- Lachnaea rupestris Beyers, endemic
- Lachnaea ruscifolia Compton, endemic
- Lachnaea sociorum Beyers, endemic
- Lachnaea stokoei Beyers, endemic
- Lachnaea striata (Poir.) Meisn. endemic
- Lachnaea uniflora (L.) Crantz, endemic
- Lachnaea villosa Beyers, endemic

=== Lasiosiphon ===
Genus Lasiosiphon:

- Lasiosiphon anthylloides (L.f.) Meisn. endemic
- Lasiosiphon burchellii Meisn. indigenous
- Lasiosiphon caffer Meisn. indigenous
- Lasiosiphon calocephalus (Meisn.) Domke, endemic
- Lasiosiphon canoargenteus C.H.Wright, endemic
- Lasiosiphon capitatus (L.f.) Burtt Davy, indigenous
- Lasiosiphon deserticola (Gilg) C.H.Wright, endemic
- Lasiosiphon dregeanus (Meisn.) Endl. endemic
- Lasiosiphon esterhuyseniae Magee & J.C.Manning, endemic
- Lasiosiphon kraussianus (Meisn.) Burtt Davy, accepted as Lasiosiphon kraussianus (Meisn.) Meisn. indigenous
- Lasiosiphon kraussianus (Meisn.) Meisn. indigenous
  - Lasiosiphon kraussianus (Meisn.) Meisn. var. kraussianus, indigenous
- Lasiosiphon macropetalus (Meisn.) Meisn. endemic
- Lasiosiphon meisnerianus Endl. endemic
- Lasiosiphon microcephalus (Meisn.) J.C.Manning & Magee, indigenous
- Lasiosiphon microphyllus (Meisn.) Meisn. endemic
- Lasiosiphon nanus Burtt Davy, indigenous
- Lasiosiphon ornatus Burtt Davy, indigenous
- Lasiosiphon pedunculatus (Beyers) J.C.Manning & Boatwr. endemic
- Lasiosiphon polyanthus (Gilg) C.H.Wright, endemic
  - Lasiosiphon polyanthus (Gilg) C.H.Wright var. microcalyx Burtt Davy, endemic
  - Lasiosiphon polyanthus (Gilg) C.H.Wright var. polyanthus, endemic
- Lasiosiphon polycephalus (E.Mey. ex Meisn.) H.Pearson, indigenous
- Lasiosiphon pulchellus (Meisn.) Decne. endemic
- Lasiosiphon rigidus J.C.Manning & Boatwr. endemic
- Lasiosiphon rubescens (B.Peterson) J.C.Manning & Magee, indigenous
- Lasiosiphon sericocephalus (Meisn.) J.C.Manning & Boatwr. indigenous
- Lasiosiphon similis C.H.Wright, indigenous
- Lasiosiphon splendens (Meisn.) Endl. indigenous
- Lasiosiphon suavissimus (Dinter) Domke, indigenous
- Lasiosiphon triplinervis (Meisn.) Decne. endemic
- Lasiosiphon wilmsii C.H.Wright, endemic

=== Passerina ===
Genus Passerina:

- Passerina burchellii Thoday, endemic
- Passerina comosa (Meisn.) C.H.Wright, endemic
- Passerina corymbosa Eckl. ex C.H.Wright, endemic
- Passerina drakensbergensis Hilliard & B.L.Burtt, endemic
- Passerina ericoides L. endemic
- Passerina esterhuyseniae Bredenk. & A.E.van Wyk, endemic
- Passerina falcifolia (Meisn.) C.H.Wright, endemic
- Passerina filiformis L. indigenous
  - Passerina filiformis L. subsp. filiformis, endemic
  - Passerina filiformis L. subsp. glutinosa (Thoday) Bredenk. & A.E.van Wyk, endemic
  - Passerina filiformis L. var. glutinosa Thoday, accepted as Passerina filiformis L. subsp. glutinosa (Thoday) Bredenk. & A.E.van Wyk, present
- Passerina galpinii C.H.Wright, endemic
- Passerina globosa Lam. accepted as Brunia squalida E.Mey. ex Sond. endemic
- Passerina glomerata Thunb. accepted as Passerina truncata (Meisn.) Bredenk. & A.E.van Wyk subsp. truncata, present
- Passerina grandiflora L.f. accepted as Lachnaea grandiflora (L.f.) Baill. present
- Passerina montana Thoday, indigenous
- Passerina montivaga Bredenk. & A.E.van Wyk, indigenous
- Passerina montivagus Bredenk. & A.E.van Wyk, accepted as Passerina montivaga Bredenk. & A.E.van Wyk, present
- Passerina nivicola Bredenk. & A.E.van Wyk, endemic
- Passerina obtusifolia Thoday, endemic
- Passerina paleacea Wikstr. endemic
- Passerina paludosa Thoday, endemic
- Passerina pendula Eckl. & Zeyh. ex Thoday, endemic
- Passerina pentandra Thunb. accepted as Brunia pentandra (Thunb.) Class.-Bockh. & E.G.H.Oliv. endemic
- Passerina quadrifaria Bredenk. & A.E.van Wyk, endemic
- Passerina rigida Wikstr. endemic
- Passerina rubra C.H.Wright, endemic
- Passerina truncata (Meisn.) Bredenk. & A.E.van Wyk, indigenous
  - Passerina truncata (Meisn.) Bredenk. & A.E.van Wyk subsp. monticola Bredenk. & A.E.van Wyk, endemic
  - Passerina truncata (Meisn.) Bredenk. & A.E.van Wyk subsp. truncata, endemic
- Passerina uniflora L.f. accepted as Lachnaea uniflora (L.) Crantz, present
- Passerina vulgaris (Meisn.) Thoday, accepted as Passerina corymbosa Eckl. ex C.H.Wright, present

=== Peddiea ===
Genus Peddiea:

- Peddiea africana Harv. indigenous

=== Struthiola ===
Genus Struthiola:

- Struthiola angustifolia Lam. accepted as Struthiola ciliata (L.) Lam. present
- Struthiola angustiloba B.Peterson & Hilliard, endemic
- Struthiola anomala Hilliard, endemic
- Struthiola argentea Lehm. endemic
- Struthiola bachmanniana Gilg, endemic
- Struthiola cicatricosa C.H.Wright, endemic
- Struthiola ciliata (L.) Lam. endemic
- Struthiola concava S.Moore, endemic
- Struthiola confusa C.H.Wright, endemic
- Struthiola congesta C.H.Wright, accepted as Struthiola pondoensis Gilg ex C.H.Wright, present
- Struthiola dodecandra (L.) Druce, endemic
- Struthiola eckloniana Meisn. endemic
- Struthiola epacridioides C.H.Wright, accepted as Struthiola hirsuta Wikstr. present
- Struthiola ericoides C.H.Wright, endemic
- Struthiola fasciata C.H.Wright, endemic
- Struthiola flavescens Gilg ex C.H.Wright, accepted as Struthiola ciliata (L.) Lam. present
- Struthiola floribunda C.H.Wright, endemic
- Struthiola fourcadei Compton, accepted as Struthiola martiana Meisn. present
- Struthiola galpinii C.H.Wright, endemic
- Struthiola garciana C.H.Wright, endemic
- Struthiola hirsuta Wikstr. endemic
- Struthiola leptantha Bolus, endemic
- Struthiola lineariloba Meisn. endemic
- Struthiola longifolia C.H.Wright, endemic
- Struthiola lucens Lam. accepted as Struthiola ciliata (L.) Lam. present
- Struthiola macowanii C.H.Wright, endemic
- Struthiola martiana Meisn. endemic
- Struthiola mundii Eckl. ex Meisn. endemic
- Struthiola myrsinites Lam. endemic
- Struthiola parviflora Bartl. ex Meisn. endemic
- Struthiola pillansii Hutch. accepted as Struthiola ciliata (L.) Lam. present
- Struthiola pondoensis Gilg ex C.H.Wright, endemic
- Struthiola ramosa C.H.Wright, endemic
- Struthiola recta C.H.Wright, endemic
- Struthiola rigida Meisn. endemic
- Struthiola rustiana Gilg, accepted as Struthiola ciliata (L.) Lam. present
- Struthiola salteri Levyns, endemic
- Struthiola striata Lam. endemic
- Struthiola tetralepis Schltr. indigenous
  - Struthiola tetralepis Schltr. var. glabricaulis Schltr. endemic
  - Struthiola tetralepis Schltr. var. tetralepis, endemic
- Struthiola tomentosa Andrews, endemic
- Struthiola tuberculosa Lam. endemic

=== Synaptolepis ===
Genus Synaptolepis:

- Synaptolepis oliveriana Gilg, indigenous
