= Leucospermum fulgens =

Conservation status
- Critically Endangered (IUCN 3.1)

Scientific classification
- Kingdom: Plantae
- Clade: Tracheophytes
- Clade: Angiosperms
- Clade: Eudicots
- Order: Proteales
- Family: Proteaceae
- Genus: Leucospermum
- Species: L. fulgens

Binomial name
- Leucospermum fulgens Rourke, 1970

Species of shrub

Leucospermum fulgens is an evergreen, upright shrub of up to 3 m (10 ft) high, from the family Proteaceae. It has hairless and leathery inverted lance-shaped to oblong leaves tipped with mostly three teeth and globe- to egg-shaped flowerheads of 6–8 cm in diameter, that consist of pink to orange, later crimson flowers. From the center of the flowers emerge almost straight styles that jointly give the impression of a pincushion. It is called Potberg pincushion in English. New pink to orange flower heads occur between August and November, but older, crimson heads may persist until January. It is a critically endangered species, only known from one location in the Western Cape province of South Africa.

== Description ==
Leucospermum fulgens is an upright and rounded shrub of up to 3 m (10 ft) high and 4 m (13 ft) across. It grows from a single main stem of up to 10 cm (4 in) thick, and has a smooth, grey bark. The flowering stems are rather stern and stiff, ½–1 cm (0.2–0.4 in) thick, and initially have some fine crisped hairs, which soon wear off. The hairless and leathery leaves are inverted lance-shaped to oblong, 6–9 cm (2.4–3.6 in) long and 1½–2 cm (0.6–0.8 in) wide, having two, three or four teeth near the tip.

The globe- to egg-shaped flowerheads of 6–8 cm (2.4–3.2 in) in diameter are seated or have a very short stalk of up to 1 cm (0.4 in) long, are usual set individually but sometimes grouped in pairs. The common base of the flowers in the same head is cone-shaped with a pointy tip, 2–4 cm (0.8–1.6 in) long and approximately 1½ cm across. The bracts that subtend each flower head are greyish because they are covered with densely matted woolly hairs, tightly overlapping and pressed against the flower head, oval with a pointy tip, about 1 cm (0.4 in) long and 7–8 mm (0.3 in) wide, and cartilaginous in consistency.

The bract that subtends each flower individually is oval in shape with an extended pointed tip (cuspidate), about 6 mm (0.24 in) long and 4 mm (0.16 in) wide, and very densely set with woolly hairs. The 4-merous perianth is 3½–4 cm (1.4–1.6 in) long, initially pink to orange coloured but later changing to brilliant crimson. The lowest, fully merged, part of the perianth, called tube, is 0.8–1.0 cm (0.32-0.40 in) long, narrow and hairless near the base but expanded and widened and minutely powdery higher up, to become constricted where it merges into the middle part. The middle part (or claws), where the perianth is split lengthwise and coils tightly when the flower opens, is covered in villous hairs and the margin has long, straight, spreading hairs. The upper part (or limbs), which enclosed the pollen presenter in the bud consists of four lance-shaped lobes with a pointy tip of about 5 mm (0.20 in) long, which are covered in villous hairs. The yellow anthers are directly fused to the limbs, 4½–5 mm (0.18–0.20 in) long, rounded at the top and lack a filament. From the perianth emerges an almost straight style (or slightly bent towards the center of the head) of 4.6–5.3 cm (1.8–2.2 in) long, bent very slightly in the direction of the centre of the head, initially yellow but later becoming crimson in colour. The thickened part at the tip of the style called pollen presenter is narrowly cone-shaped with a pointy tip and about 4 mm (0.16 in) long, with a groove acting as the stigma across the very tip. The ovary is subtended by four awl-shaped scales of about 2 mm (0.08 in) long.

== Taxonomy ==
John Patrick Rourke described this species in 1970.

The species name fulgens is a Latin word meaning "shyny".

L. fulgens has been assigned to the section Tumiditubus.

== Distribution, habitat and ecology ==
The Potberg pincushion can only be found near De Hoop Nature Reserve just south of the Potberg on Cupido's Kraal farm. It grows only on partially stabilized sandy hills in the trough between the Potberg (consisting of Table Mountain Sandstone) and the limestone ridge of the Alexandria Formation, parallel to the coast. This narrow zone of only a few hundred meters at an altitude of about 150 m (500 ft) above sealevel, consists of deep Tertiary to Quaternary white sands. The species does not occur on either the bordering limestone or Table Mountain Sandstone. It appears as a dense stand in a vegetation that further mostly consists of tall, tufted Restionaceae, Passerina and Metalasia species. The average annual precipitation in this area is 375–500 mm (15–20 in), most of which falls during the winter.

== Conservation ==
The Potberg pincushion is considered critically endangered, because only one small, shrinking population is known, within a potential distribution of only 19 km^{2} (7.3 sq mi), increasing dominance of invasive species is a current thread, while agricultural development and inadequate fire management could add to the risk.
