= Passerina filiformis subsp. filiformis =

Scientific classification
- Kingdom: Plantae
- Clade: Tracheophytes
- Clade: Angiosperms
- Clade: Eudicots
- Clade: Rosids
- Order: Malvales
- Family: Thymelaeaceae
- Genus: Passerina
- Species: P. filiformis L.
- Subspecies: P. f. subsp. filiformis

Trinomial name
- Passerina filiformis subsp. filiformis

Synonyms
- Passerina cupressina H.L.Wendl. ex Bartl.; Passerina pectinata Lodd.

Subspecies of flowering plant

Passerina filiformis subsp. filiformis is a shrub belonging to the genus Passerina. The species is endemic to South Africa and occurs in the Western Cape. It is a subspecies of Passerina filiformis.
