= Pimelea gnidia =

- Flowering P. gnidia plant from northern South Island

Conservation status
- Not Threatened (NZ TCS)

Scientific classification
- Kingdom: Plantae
- Clade: Tracheophytes
- Clade: Angiosperms
- Clade: Eudicots
- Clade: Rosids
- Order: Malvales
- Family: Thymelaeaceae
- Genus: Pimelea
- Species: P. gnidia

Binomial name
- Pimelea gnidia (J.R.Forst. & G.Forst.) Willd.

Synonyms
- Banksia gnidia J.R.Forst. et G.Forst.; Passerina gnidia L.f.; Cookia gnidia J.F.Gmel.; Pimelea gnidia var. menziesii Hook. f.; Pimelea crosby-smithiana Petrie

Species of shrub

Pimelea gnidia is a species of small shrub in the family Thymelaeaceae. It is endemic to New Zealand.

== Description ==
Pimelea gnidia is a small gynodioecious shrub that grows up to 1.5 m tall. Its branches are ascending and have decussate, ascending, pointed leaves with very short petioles. Flowers are clustered into few to many-flowered inflorescences with very short pedicels. Corollas are hairy, white and fragrant and have a fused tube to nearly 1 cm long. Fruits are small (4 mm long), egg-shaped and green, becoming brown when dry.

== Tax0nomy ==
Pimelea gnidia was originally described by Johan Reinhold Forster and Georg Forster in 1776 as Banksia gnidia. The species was subsequently transferred to the genus Passerina by Georg Forster in 1782, and then to Cookia by Johann Friedrich Gmelin in 1791, and finally to Pimelea by Carl Ludwig Willdenow in 1797. The lectotype specimen was collected by the Forsters in Dusky Sound, Fiordland in 1773 during James Cook's second voyage and is housed at the Natural History Museum in London (BM 829816).

In a phylogenetic analysis using standard nuclear and plastome DNA sequencing markers, P. gnidia was the sister species to P. longifolia with moderate to strong support. P. longifolia is another New Zealand species that is also morphologically similar to P. gnidia, and the two species have also been known to hybridise in the wild.

== Distribution ==
Pimelea gnidia is endemic to New Zealand. It is found on North Island and the South Island. On the North Island, it is found in the Tararua Range. On the South Island, it is found from Nelson through to Fiordland, from coastal to subalpine habitats in scrub and snow-tussock herbfields.

== Conservation status ==
According to the most recent (2023) New Zealand Threat Classification System (NZTCS), P. gnidia is considered to be not threatened.

== Gallery ==
Habit

Habit

Close up of flowers

Habitat in Fiordland
