= Passerina filiformis subsp. glutinosa =

Scientific classification
- Kingdom: Plantae
- Clade: Tracheophytes
- Clade: Angiosperms
- Clade: Eudicots
- Clade: Rosids
- Order: Malvales
- Family: Thymelaeaceae
- Genus: Passerina
- Species: P. filiformis
- Subspecies: P. f. subsp. glutinosa

Trinomial name
- Passerina filiformis subsp. glutinosa (Thoday) Bredenk. & A.E.van Wyk

Synonyms
- Passerina filiformis var. glutinosa Thoday

Subspecies of flowering plant

Passerina filiformis subsp. glutinosa is a shrub belonging to the genus Passerina. The species is endemic to South Africa and occurs in the Western Cape, from St. Helena Bay to Doringbaai. It is a subspecies of Passerina filiformis and is part of the fynbos biome. The subspecies has a range of 7 500 km^{2} and fifteen subpopulations are known. The plant is threatened by invasive plants, coastal development and potato farming.
