= Royal Mallow =

Royal Mallow may refer to:

- Lavatera assurgentiflora
- Lavatera trimestris
- The Royal Mallows, a fictional regiment
