= Passerina ternata =

Scientific classification
- Kingdom: Plantae
- Clade: Tracheophytes
- Clade: Angiosperms
- Clade: Eudicots
- Clade: Rosids
- Order: Malvales
- Family: Thymelaeaceae
- Genus: Passerina
- Species: P. ternata

Binomial name
- Passerina ternata Magee & Euston-Brown

Species of flowering plant

Passerina ternata is a shrub belonging to the genus Passerina. The species was described in 2022.
