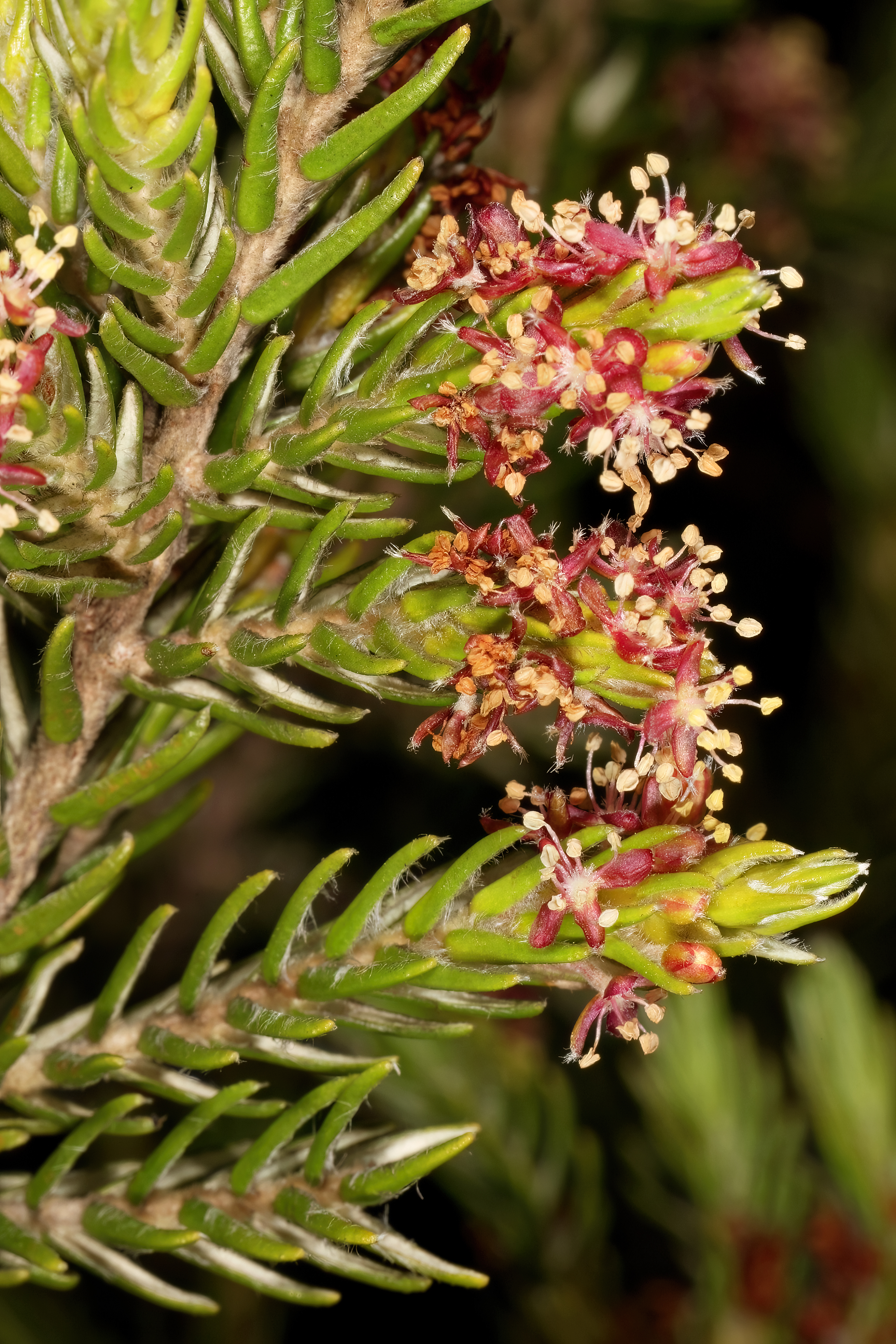

Scientific classification
- Kingdom: Plantae
- Clade: Tracheophytes
- Clade: Angiosperms
- Clade: Eudicots
- Clade: Rosids
- Order: Malvales
- Family: Thymelaeaceae
- Genus: Passerina
- Species: P. montivaga

Binomial name
- Passerina montivaga Bredenk. & A.E.van Wyk

= Passerina montivaga =

Species of flowering plant

Passerina montivaga, the brown forest gonna, is a shrub belonging to the genus Passerina. The species is native to Eswatini and South Africa, where it occurs in KwaZulu-Natal, Mpumalanga, the Eastern Cape and the Western Cape.
