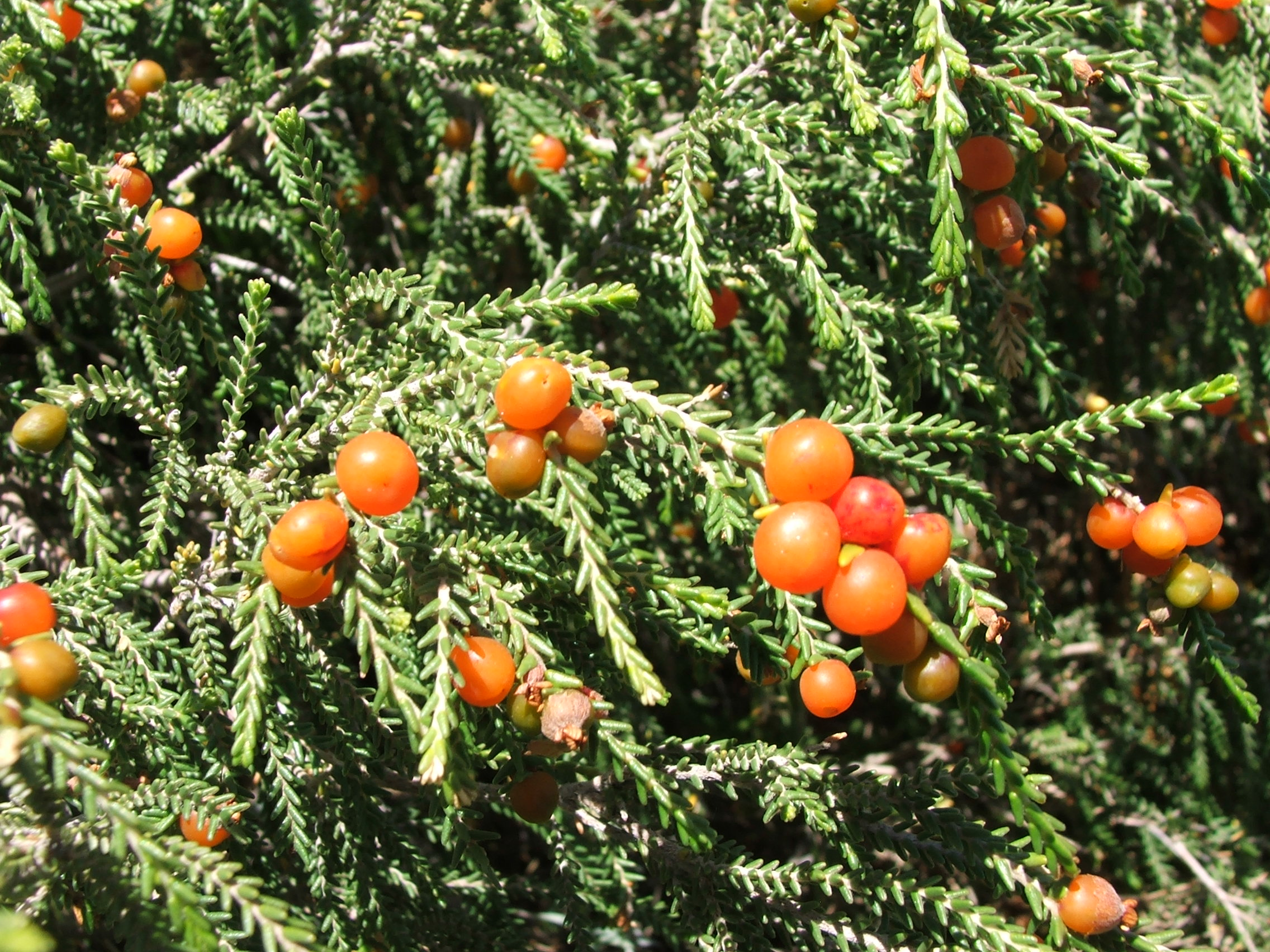

Scientific classification
- Kingdom: Plantae
- Clade: Tracheophytes
- Clade: Angiosperms
- Clade: Eudicots
- Clade: Rosids
- Order: Malvales
- Family: Thymelaeaceae
- Genus: Passerina
- Species: P. ericoides

Binomial name
- Passerina ericoides L. (1767)

= Passerina ericoides =

Species of flowering plant

Passerina ericoides, the Christmas berry, is a threatened species of plant in the family Thymelaeaceae, genus Passerina. It is indigenous to the coastal fynbos areas in and around the city of Cape Town, South Africa.

== Description and biology ==
Passerina ericoides is a shrub typically up to 1 metre high, with narrow, slightly succulent, leaves some two to three mm long, its flowers are greenish-yellow to reddish, and are subtended by leaflike bracts. Unlike most species of Passerina, the plant bears fleshy orange or red berries. They taste nasty, but are harmless and look very attractive. Tortoises eat them and presumably spread their seed in their droppings. For that reason one of the common names is "skilpadbessie" (Afrikaans for "tortoise berry", a name shared with various other plants such as Nylandtia and Chironia baccifera.)

== Uses ==
Passerina ericoides is an excellent plant for stabilising mobile sand dunes. Its strong, extensive roots bind the sand, and send up shoots elsewhere to do likewise. It also is a rewarding, "water wise" plant for coastal gardens. It can be propagated by seed or by cuttings.
