= Passerina burchellii =

Scientific classification
- Kingdom: Plantae
- Clade: Tracheophytes
- Clade: Angiosperms
- Clade: Eudicots
- Clade: Rosids
- Order: Malvales
- Family: Thymelaeaceae
- Genus: Passerina
- Species: P. burchellii

Binomial name
- Passerina burchellii Thoday

Species of flowering plant

Passerina burchellii is a shrub belonging to the genus Passerina. The species is endemic to South Africa and occurs in the Western Cape, in the Riviersonderend Mountains and Stettynsberge. The plant is part of the fynbos biome. It has a range of 189 km^{2} and there are five subpopulations that are threatened by invasive plants.
