= Passerina paleacea =

Scientific classification
- Kingdom: Plantae
- Clade: Tracheophytes
- Clade: Angiosperms
- Clade: Eudicots
- Clade: Rosids
- Order: Malvales
- Family: Thymelaeaceae
- Genus: Passerina
- Species: P. paleacea

Binomial name
- Passerina paleacea Wikstr., 1818

Synonyms
- Lachnaea paleacea Banks ex Wikstr.; Passerina hamulata Gand.

Species of flowering plant

Passerina paleacea is a shrub belonging to the genus Passerina. The species is endemic to South Africa and occurs in the Western Cape.
