= Passerina nivicola =

Scientific classification
- Kingdom: Plantae
- Clade: Tracheophytes
- Clade: Angiosperms
- Clade: Eudicots
- Clade: Rosids
- Order: Malvales
- Family: Thymelaeaceae
- Genus: Passerina
- Species: P. nivicola

Binomial name
- Passerina nivicola Bredenk. & A.E.van Wyk

Species of flowering plant

Passerina nivicola is a shrub belonging to the genus Passerina. The species is endemic to South Africa and occurs in the Northern Cape and the Western Cape, on mountain slopes. It grows to 2 meters in height.
