= Passerina drakensbergensis =

Scientific classification
- Kingdom: Plantae
- Clade: Tracheophytes
- Clade: Angiosperms
- Clade: Eudicots
- Clade: Rosids
- Order: Malvales
- Family: Thymelaeaceae
- Genus: Passerina
- Species: P. drakensbergensis

Binomial name
- Passerina drakensbergensis Hilliard & B.L.Burtt

Species of flowering plant

Passerina drakensbergensis the Drakensberg gonna, is a shrub belonging to the genus Passerina. The species is endemic to South Africa and occurs in KwaZulu-Natal.
