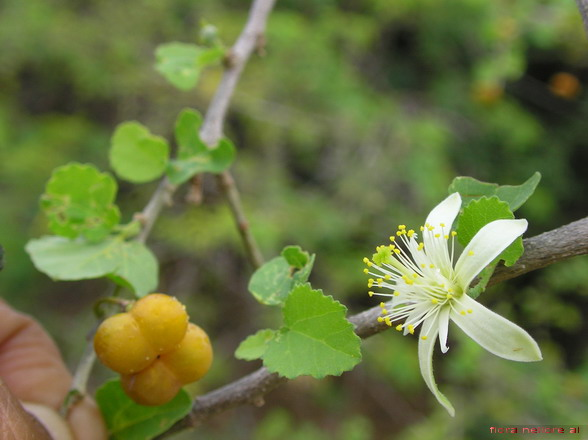
- Fruit and flower

Conservation status
- Least Concern (IUCN 3.1)

Scientific classification
- Kingdom: Plantae
- Clade: Tracheophytes
- Clade: Angiosperms
- Clade: Eudicots
- Clade: Rosids
- Order: Malvales
- Family: Malvaceae
- Genus: Grewia
- Species: G. tenax

Binomial name
- Grewia tenax (Forssk.) Fiori

Synonyms
- List: Chadara tenax Forssk.; Grewia betulifolia Juss.; Grewia chadara Lam.; Grewia makranica Rech.f. & Esfand.; Grewia populifolia Vahl; Grewia ribesiifolia Hochst. ex Mast.

= Grewia tenax =

Species of flowering plant

Grewia tenax, called the phalsa cherry, white crossberry, raisin bush, gangara, gangu, or kanger, is a species of flowering plant in the family Malvaceae. It is native to Africa, from the Sahara to Tanzania and parts of southern Africa, the Arabian Peninsula, and on to the Indian subcontinent. The ripe fruit is edible and is consumed by local peoples either fresh, dried, or powered in drinks.

== Subtaxa ==
The following subspecies are currently accepted:

- Grewia tenax subsp. makranica (Rech.f. & Esfand.) Browicz – Iran, Afghanistan, Pakistan
- Grewia tenax subsp. tenax
