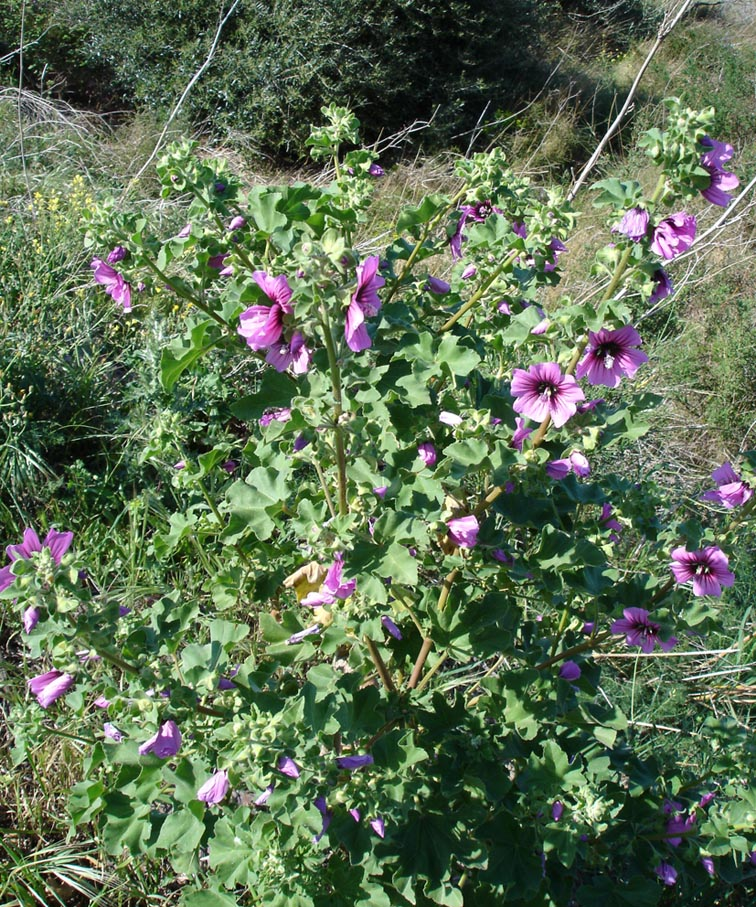

Scientific classification
- Kingdom: Plantae
- Clade: Tracheophytes
- Clade: Angiosperms
- Clade: Eudicots
- Clade: Rosids
- Order: Malvales
- Family: Malvaceae
- Genus: Malva
- Species: M. arborea

Binomial name
- Malva arborea (L.) Webb & Berthel.

Synonyms
- Lavatera arborea (L.); Malva dendromorpha M.F.Ray; Malva eriocalyx (Steud.) Molero & J.M.Monts.

= Malva arborea =

Species of flowering plant

Malva arborea (previously known as Lavatera arborea, or, more recently as Malva eriocalyx), the tree mallow, is a species of mallow native to the coasts of western Europe and the Mediterranean region, from Ireland and Britain south to Algeria and Libya, and east to Greece.

== Description ==
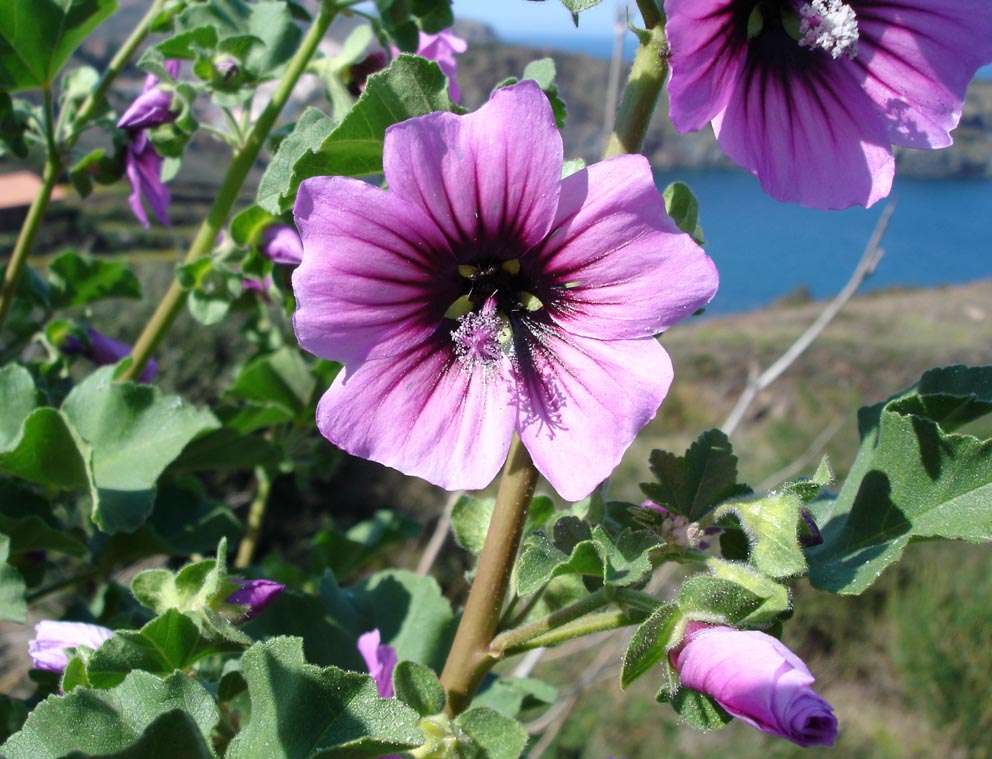
Flower

It is a shrubby annual, biennial or perennial plant growing to 0.5–2 m (rarely 3 m) tall. The leaves are orbicular, 8–18 cm diameter, palmately lobed with five to nine lobes, and a coarsely serrated margin. The flowers are 3–4 cm diameter, dark pink to purple and grow in fasciculate axillary clusters of two to seven.

== Taxonomy ==
It was first named in 1753 by Carl Linnaeus as Lavatera arborea, but was transferred to the genus Malva in 1836 by Philip Barker-Webb and Sabin Berthelot.

Although long considered a species of Lavatera, genetic and morphological analysis by Martin Forbes Ray, reported in 1998, suggested it was better placed in the genus Malva, in which it was named Malva dendromorpha M.F.Ray. However the earlier name Malva arborea (L.) Webb & Berthel. was validly published and has priority over Malva dendromorpha.

== Habitat ==
Malva arborea tolerates sea water to varying degrees, at up to 100% sea water in its natural habitat, excreting salt through glands on its leaves. This salt tolerance can be a competitive advantage over inland plant species in coastal areas. Its level of salinity tolerance is thought to be improved by soil with higher phosphate content, making guano enrichment particularly beneficial. It grows mainly on exposed coastal locations, often on small islands, only rarely any distance inland.

== Uses ==
The leaves of the species are used in herbal medicine to treat sprains, by steeping them in hot water and applying the poultice to the affected area. It is theorised that lighthouse keepers may have spread the plant to some British islands for use as a poultice and to treat burns, an occupational hazard. Thought to have been used as an alternative to toilet paper. The seeds are edible and are known in French as "petit pains", or "little breads".

Tree mallow was considered a nutritive animal food in Britain in the 19th century, and is still sometimes used as animal fodder in Europe. For human consumption, some sources describe the leaves of tree mallow as edible, although not as palatable as common mallow, unless cut very thinly, because of the very velours-like hairy mouth-feel.

Malva arborea has long been cultivated in British gardens, as described in the 1835 self-published book British Phaenogamous Botany, which used the then-common name Sea Tree-mallow: "This species is frequently met with in gardens, where, if it is allowed to scatter its seeds, it will spring up for many successive years, and often attain a large size. The young plants will, as Sir J. E. Smith observes, now and then survive one or more mild Winters; but having once blossomed it perishes."

While sometimes detrimental to seabird habitat, management of tree mallow (both planting and thinning) has been successfully employed to shelter nesting sites of the threatened roseate tern, which requires more coverage than common terns to impede predation.

== Invasive spread ==
Tree mallow seeds may be transported between separated coastal areas by the floating fruit, and seabirds are considered a likely means of spread. The seeds are encased in an impermeable outer case, and can remain viable for years, even after extended immersion in saltwater.

The tree mallow's recent increased range among Scottish islands has raised concerns that it is displacing native vegetation, and is reducing Atlantic puffin (Fratercula arctica) populations in affected areas. The plant forms dense stands along the island coasts that inhibit breeding, and causes the puffins to abandon their burrows.

Its spread among Australian islands in recent decades is thought to be reducing biodiversity, soil retention, and seabird habitat. According to one study, "Crested and Caspian Terns that nest in the open are closed out by the canopy, and Little Penguins (Eudyptula minor) and Bridled Terns (Sterna anaethetus) are excluded by the lack of undergrowth".

In New Zealand it has established on several seabird-dominated islands where it is considered to be a serious ecological weed and for which there are active eradication programmes, such as on North Brother Island in Cook Strait.
