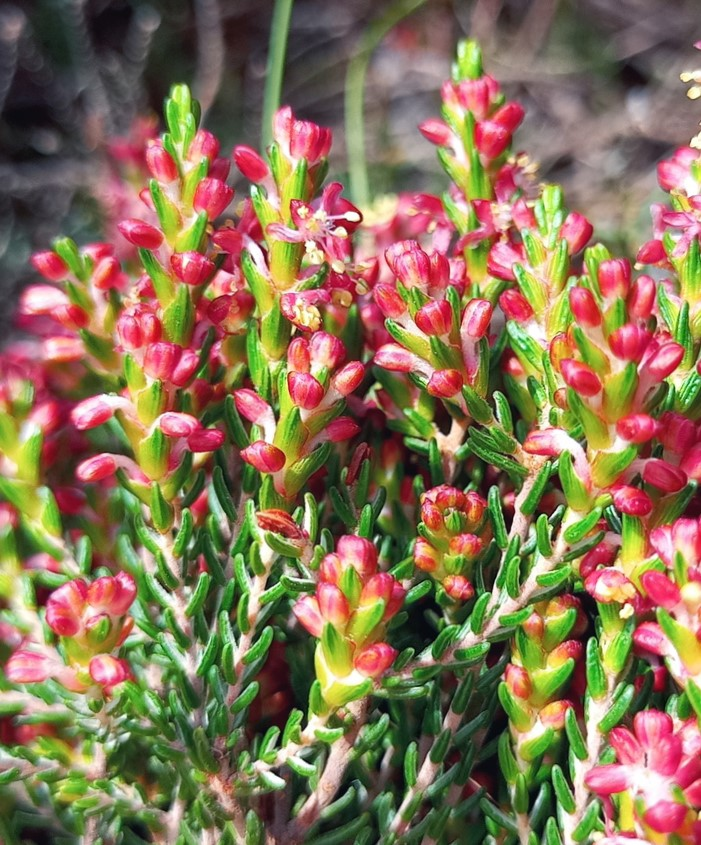

Scientific classification
- Kingdom: Plantae
- Clade: Tracheophytes
- Clade: Angiosperms
- Clade: Eudicots
- Clade: Rosids
- Order: Malvales
- Family: Thymelaeaceae
- Genus: Passerina
- Species: P. rubra

Binomial name
- Passerina rubra C.H.Wright, (1915)

Synonyms
- Passerina filiformis var. squarrosa Meisn.

= Passerina rubra =

Species of flowering plant

Passerina rubra is a shrub belonging to the genus Passerina. The species is endemic to South Africa and occurs in the Eastern Cape and the Western Cape.
