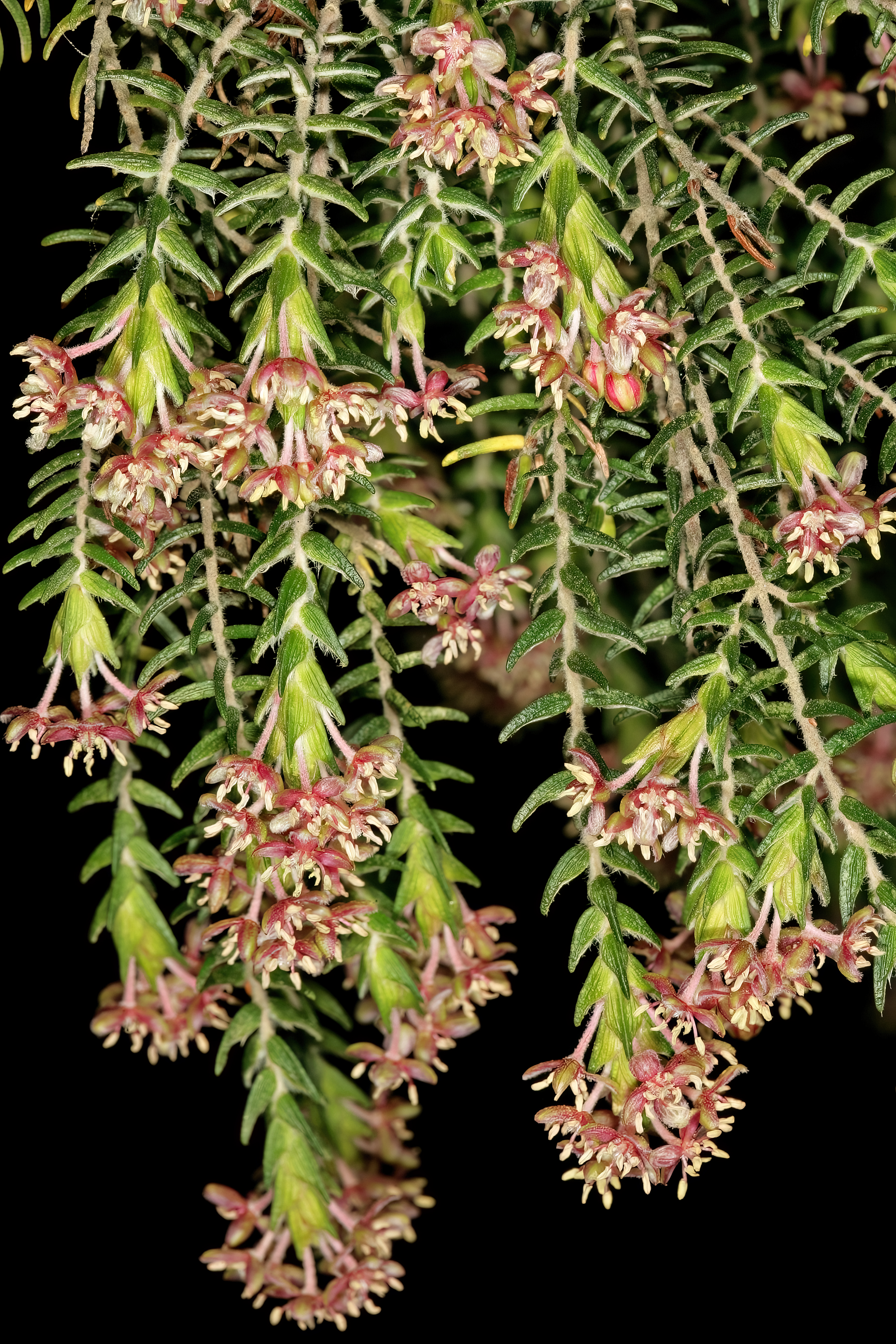

Conservation status
- Least Concern (IUCN 3.1)

Scientific classification
- Kingdom: Plantae
- Clade: Tracheophytes
- Clade: Angiosperms
- Clade: Eudicots
- Clade: Rosids
- Order: Malvales
- Family: Thymelaeaceae
- Genus: Passerina
- Species: P. falcifolia

Binomial name
- Passerina falcifolia (Meisn.) C.H.Wright

= Passerina falcifolia =

Species of flowering plant

Passerina falcifolia, the Outeniqua gonna, is a tree belonging to the genus Passerina. The species is endemic to South Africa. It occurs in the Eastern Cape and the Western Cape, from the Outeniqua Mountains to the Zuurberg and the coastal forests near Alexandria in the Eastern Cape. It is part of the fynbos.
