= Passerina esterhuyseniae =

Scientific classification
- Kingdom: Plantae
- Clade: Tracheophytes
- Clade: Angiosperms
- Clade: Eudicots
- Clade: Rosids
- Order: Malvales
- Family: Thymelaeaceae
- Genus: Passerina
- Species: P. esterhuyseniae

Binomial name
- Passerina esterhuyseniae Bredenk. & A.E.van Wyk

Species of flowering plant

Passerina esterhuyseniae is a shrub belonging to the genus Passerina. The species is endemic to South Africa. It occurs in the Western Cape in the northern Cederberg, from Pakhuis to Koupoort. It is part of the fynbos biome.
