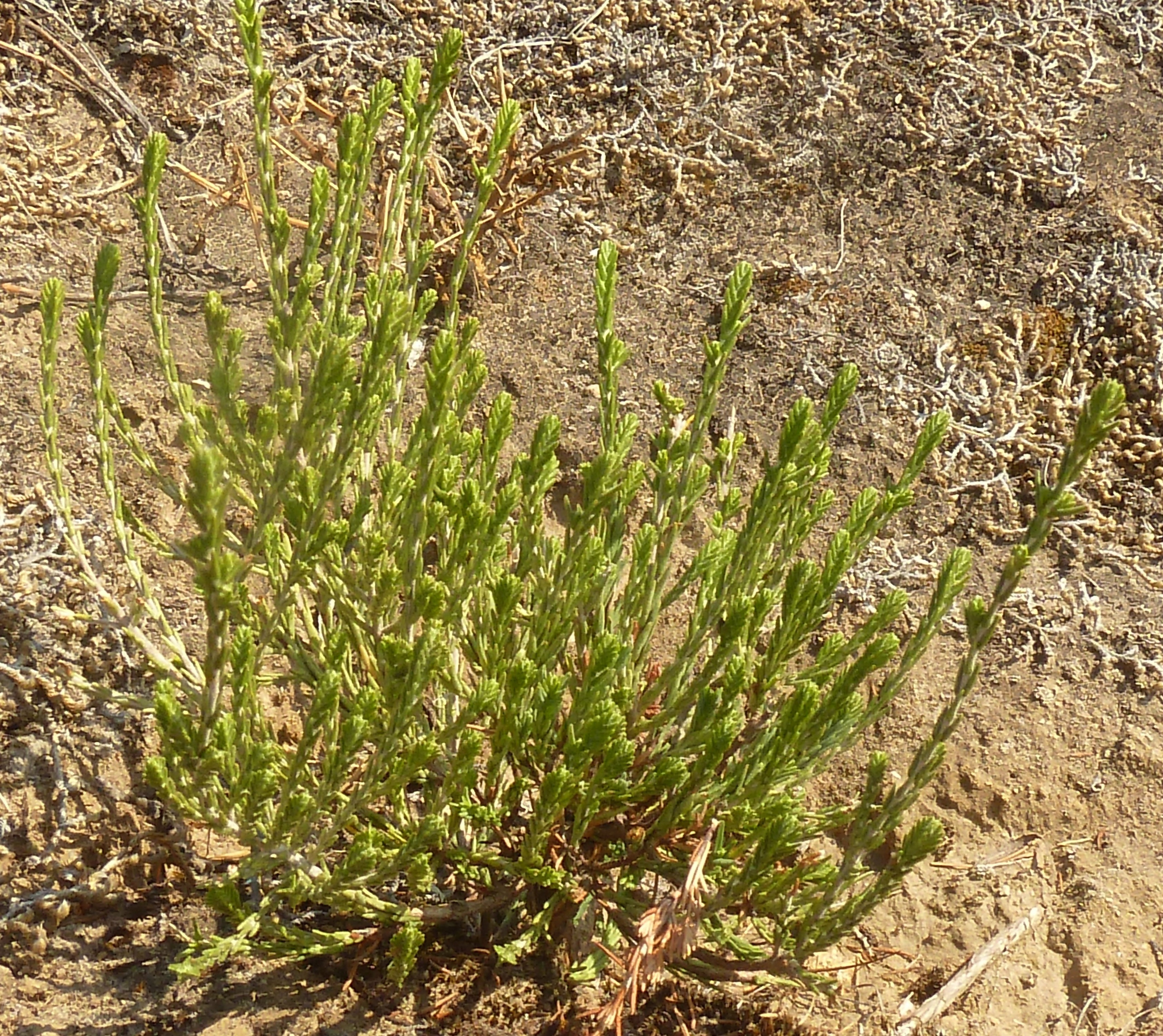

Scientific classification
- Kingdom: Plantae
- Clade: Tracheophytes
- Clade: Angiosperms
- Clade: Eudicots
- Clade: Rosids
- Order: Malvales
- Family: Thymelaeaceae
- Genus: Passerina
- Species: P. montana

Binomial name
- Passerina montana Thoday

= Passerina montana =

Species of flowering plant

Passerina montana, the mountain gonna, is a shrub belonging to the genus Passerina. The species is native to Angola, Eswatini, Lesotho, Mozambique, Namibia, South Africa and Zimbabwe. In South Africa, the plant occurs in KwaZulu-Natal, Limpopo, Mpumalanga, North West, the Eastern Cape and the Free State.
