= Passerina comosa =

Scientific classification
- Kingdom: Plantae
- Clade: Tracheophytes
- Clade: Angiosperms
- Clade: Eudicots
- Clade: Rosids
- Order: Malvales
- Family: Thymelaeaceae
- Genus: Passerina
- Species: P. comosa

Binomial name
- Passerina comosa (Meisn.) C.H.Wright

Synonyms
- Passerina filiformis var. comosa Meisn.

Species of flowering plant

Passerina comosa is a shrub belonging to the genus Passerina. The species is endemic to South Africa and occurs in the Northern Cape and the Western Cape.
