= Passerina quadrifaria =

Scientific classification
- Kingdom: Plantae
- Clade: Tracheophytes
- Clade: Angiosperms
- Clade: Eudicots
- Clade: Rosids
- Order: Malvales
- Family: Thymelaeaceae
- Genus: Passerina
- Species: P. quadrifaria

Binomial name
- Passerina quadrifaria Bredenk. & A.E.van Wyk

Species of flowering plant

Passerina quadrifaria is a shrub belonging to the genus Passerina. The species is endemic to South Africa and occurs in the Eastern Cape and the Western Cape.
