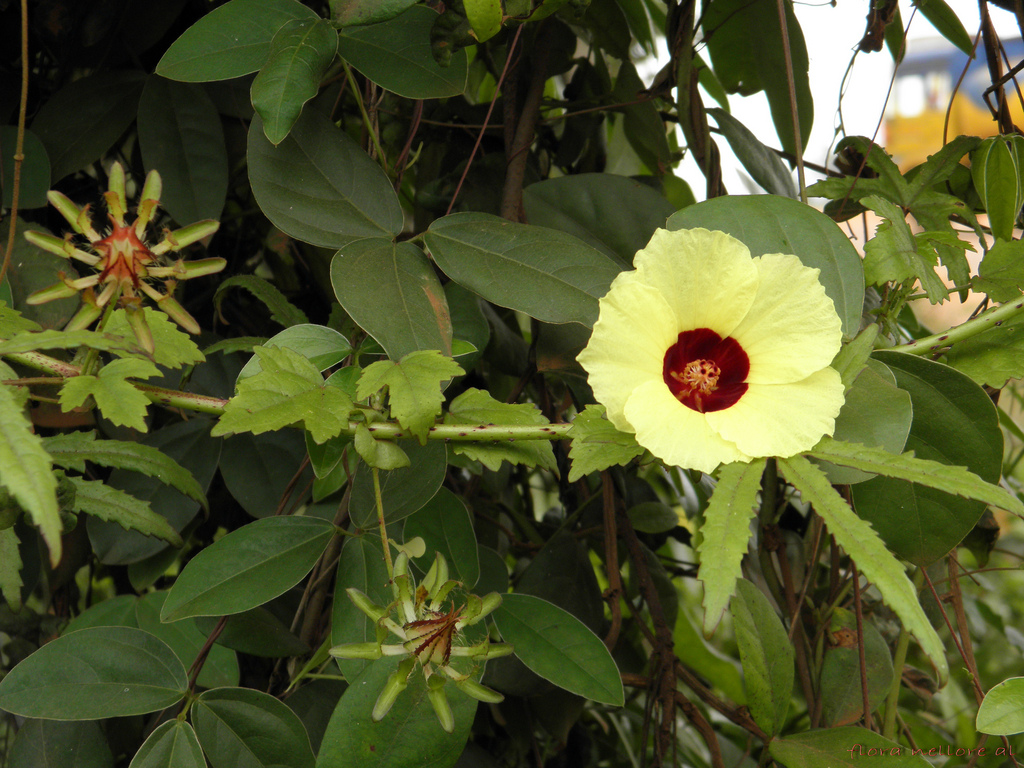
- Flower and flower buds
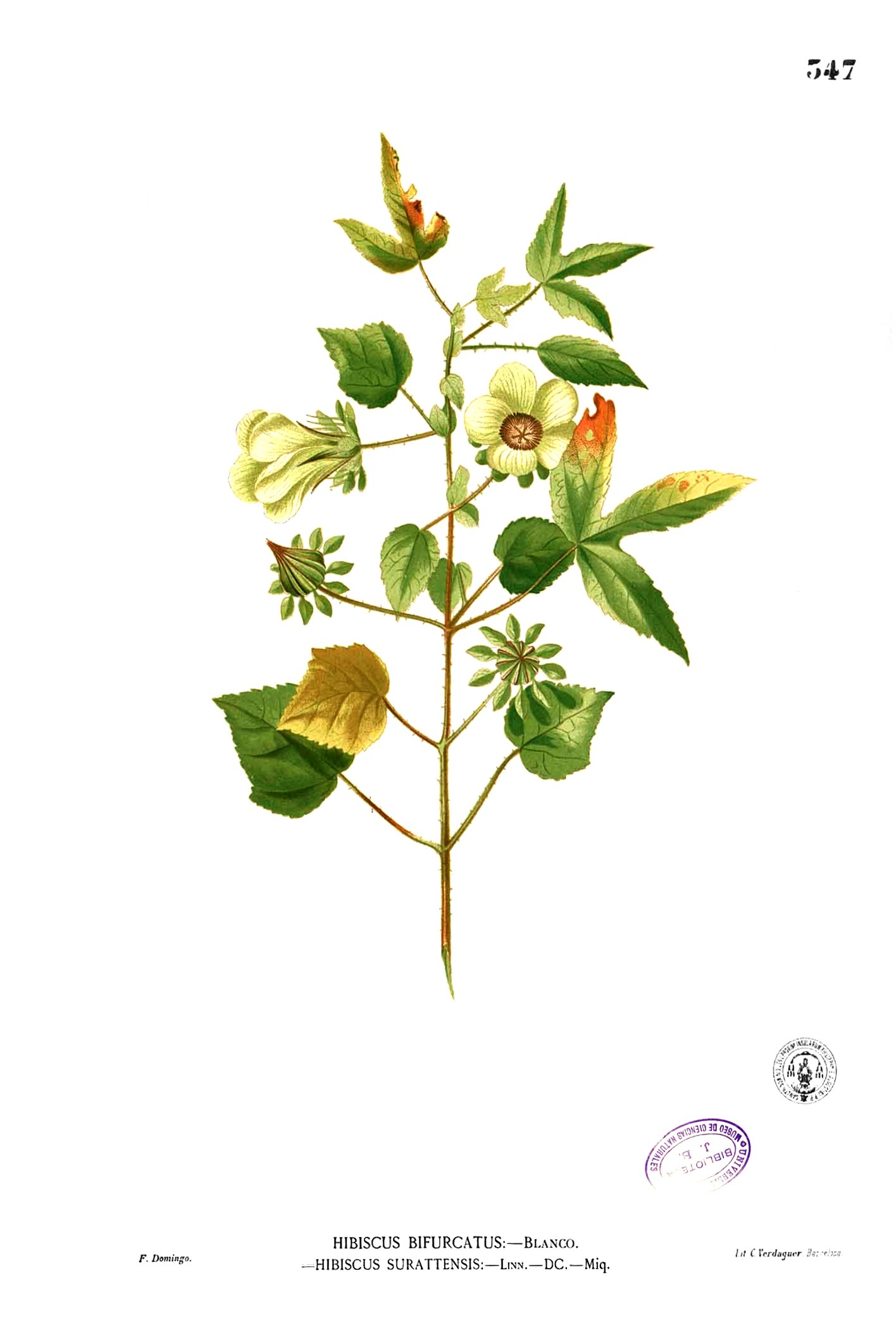
- Botanical illustration

Scientific classification
- Kingdom: Plantae
- Clade: Tracheophytes
- Clade: Angiosperms
- Clade: Eudicots
- Clade: Rosids
- Order: Malvales
- Family: Malvaceae
- Genus: Hibiscus
- Species: H. surattensis

Binomial name
- Hibiscus surattensis L.

Synonyms
- List: Abelmoschus aculeatus Walp.; Furcaria surattensis (L.) Kostel.; Hibiscus aculeatus G.Don; Hibiscus appendiculatus Stokes; Hibiscus bifurcatus Blanco; Hibiscus hypoglossus E.Mey. ex Harv.; Hibiscus involucratus Salisb.; Hibiscus surattensis var. genuinus Hochr.; Hibiscus surattensis var. villosus Hochr.; Hibiscus trinitarius Noronha

= Hibiscus surattensis =

Species of plant in the mallow family

Hibiscus surattensis, the bush sorrel or wild sour, is a widespread species of flowering plant in the family Malvaceae. It is native to the seasonally dry tropical (and subtropical) Old World, and has been introduced to many islands of the Indian Ocean. As the common names imply, it is eaten as a leafy green by local peoples.

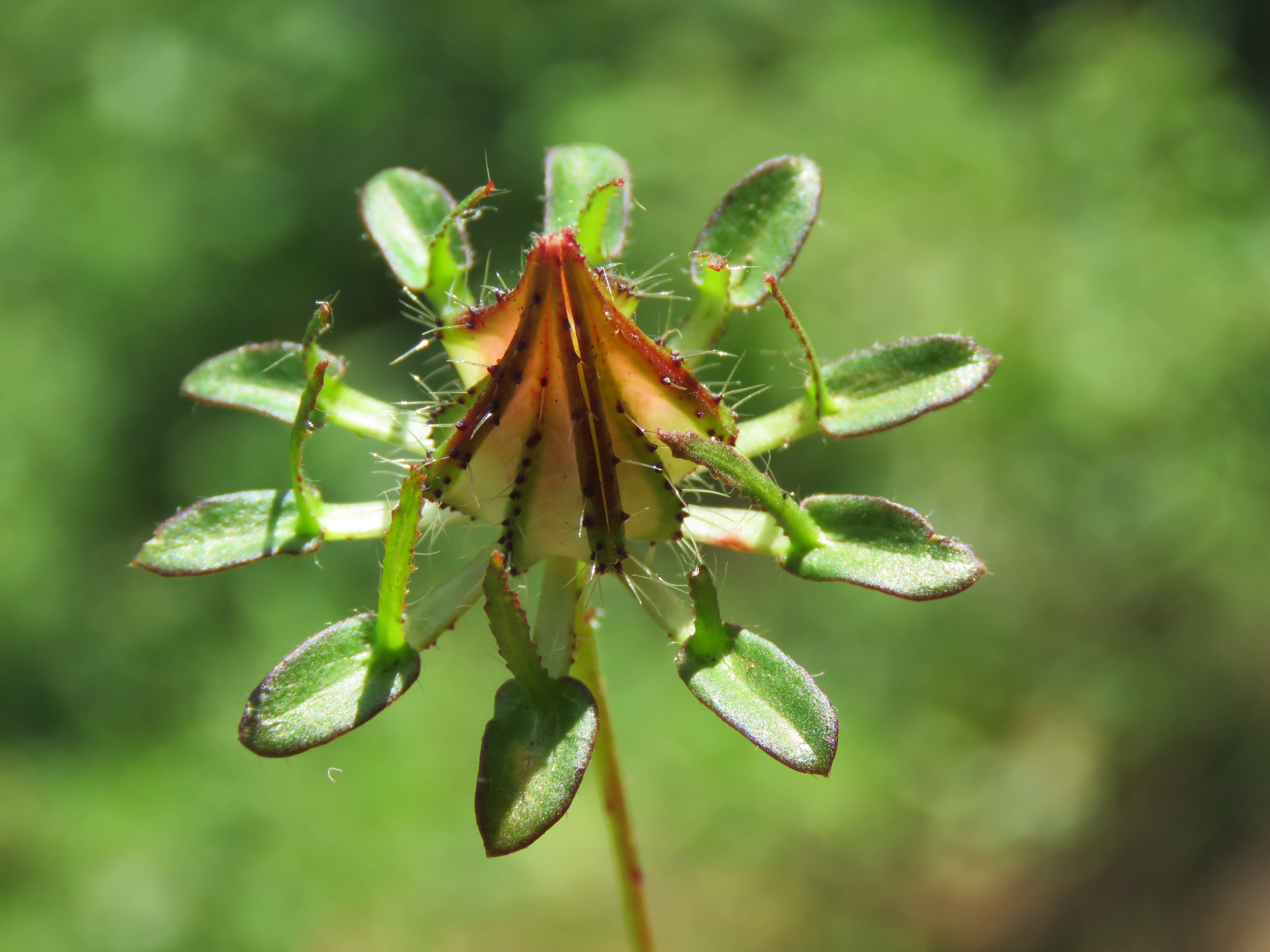
The false sepals (the spoon-like green bracts with prongs) are a distinguishing feature of the species.
