= Passerina filiformis =

Scientific classification
- Kingdom: Plantae
- Clade: Tracheophytes
- Clade: Angiosperms
- Clade: Eudicots
- Clade: Rosids
- Order: Malvales
- Family: Thymelaeaceae
- Genus: Passerina
- Species: P. filiformis

Binomial name
- Passerina filiformis L. (1753)

Synonyms
- Lachnaea filiformis (L.) Crantz

Species of flowering plant

Passerina filiformis, the brown gonna, is a shrub belonging to the genus Passerina. The species is endemic to South Africa and occurs in the Western Cape.

The plant has two subspecies:

- Passerina filiformis subsp. filiformis
- Passerina filiformis subsp. glutinosa (Thoday) Brodenk. & A.E. van Wyk
