= Passerina rigida =

Scientific classification
- Kingdom: Plantae
- Clade: Tracheophytes
- Clade: Angiosperms
- Clade: Eudicots
- Clade: Rosids
- Order: Malvales
- Family: Thymelaeaceae
- Genus: Passerina
- Species: P. rigi

Binomial name
- Passerina rigi Wikstr.

Synonyms
- Passerina eriophora Gand.

Species of flowering plant

Passerina rigida, the dune gonna, is a shrub belonging to the genus Passerina. The species is endemic to South Africa, where it occurs in KwaZulu-Natal, the Eastern Cape and the Western Cape.
