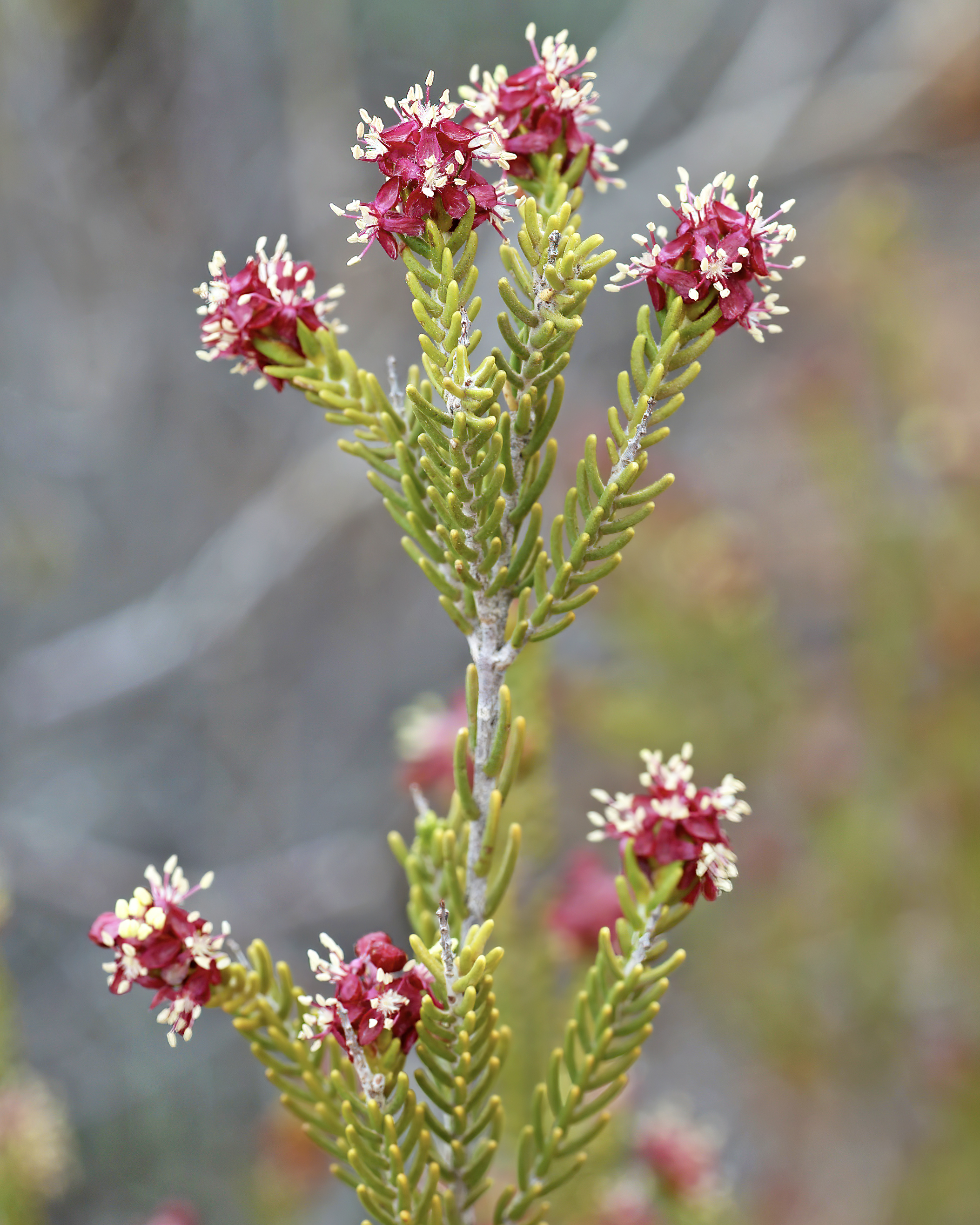

Scientific classification
- Kingdom: Plantae
- Clade: Tracheophytes
- Clade: Angiosperms
- Clade: Eudicots
- Clade: Rosids
- Order: Malvales
- Family: Thymelaeaceae
- Genus: Passerina
- Species: P. obtusifolia

Binomial name
- Passerina obtusifolia Thoday

= Passerina obtusifolia =

Species of flowering plant

Passerina obtusifolia, the Karoo gonna, is a shrub belonging to the genus Passerina. The species is endemic to South Africa and occurs in the Northern Cape, Eastern Cape and Western Cape.
