= Passerina paludosa =

Scientific classification
- Kingdom: Plantae
- Clade: Tracheophytes
- Clade: Angiosperms
- Clade: Eudicots
- Clade: Rosids
- Order: Malvales
- Family: Thymelaeaceae
- Genus: Passerina
- Species: P. paludosa

Binomial name
- Passerina paludosa Thoday

Species of flowering plant

Passerina paludosa is a shrub belonging to the genus Passerina. The species is endemic to South Africa and occurs in the Western Cape on the Cape Flats and the Agulhas Plain. The plant has a range of 3200 km^{2} and there are five subpopulations. It is part of the strandveld and fynbos biomes. The plant has already lost 70% of its habitat on the Cape Flats due to development and the associated drainage of swampy areas. Two subpopulations have recently been discovered on the Agulhas Plain but are threatened by invasive plants and development.
