= Passerina galpinii =

Scientific classification
- Kingdom: Plantae
- Clade: Tracheophytes
- Clade: Angiosperms
- Clade: Eudicots
- Clade: Rosids
- Order: Malvales
- Family: Thymelaeaceae
- Genus: Passerina
- Species: P. galpinii

Binomial name
- Passerina galpinii C.H.Wright

Species of flowering plant

Passerina galpinii is a shrub belonging to the genus Passerina. The species is endemic to South Africa and occurs in the Western Cape.
