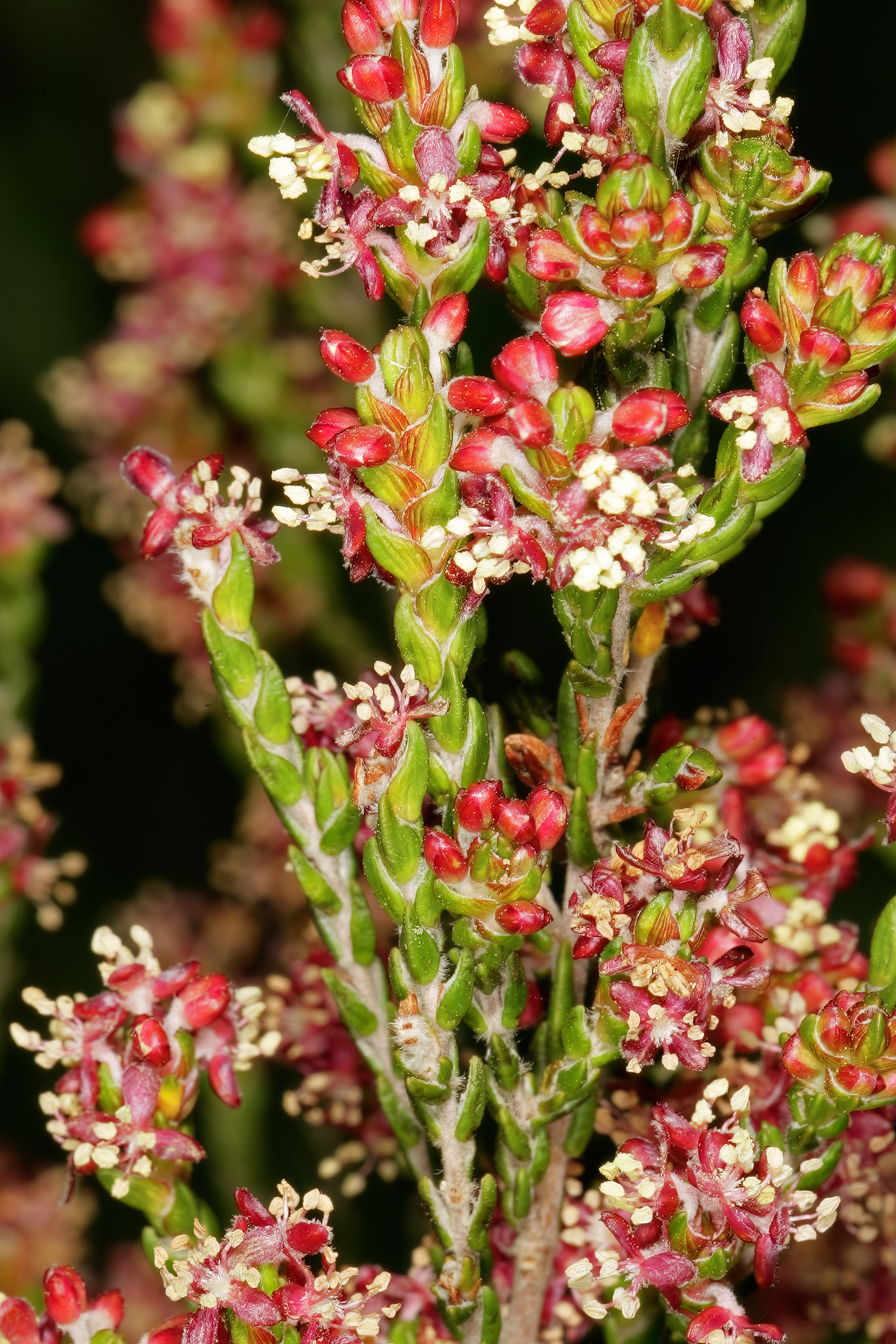

Scientific classification
- Kingdom: Plantae
- Clade: Tracheophytes
- Clade: Angiosperms
- Clade: Eudicots
- Clade: Rosids
- Order: Malvales
- Family: Thymelaeaceae
- Genus: Passerina
- Species: P. corymbosa

Binomial name
- Passerina corymbosa Eckl. ex C.H.Wright

Synonyms
- Passerina filiformis var. vulgaris Meisn.; Passerina vulgaris (Meisn.) Thoday

= Passerina corymbosa =

Species of flowering plant

Passerina corymbosa, the common cluster-flower gonna, is a shrub belonging to the genus Passerina. The species is endemic to South Africa and occurs in KwaZulu-Natal, the Eastern Cape and the Western Cape.
