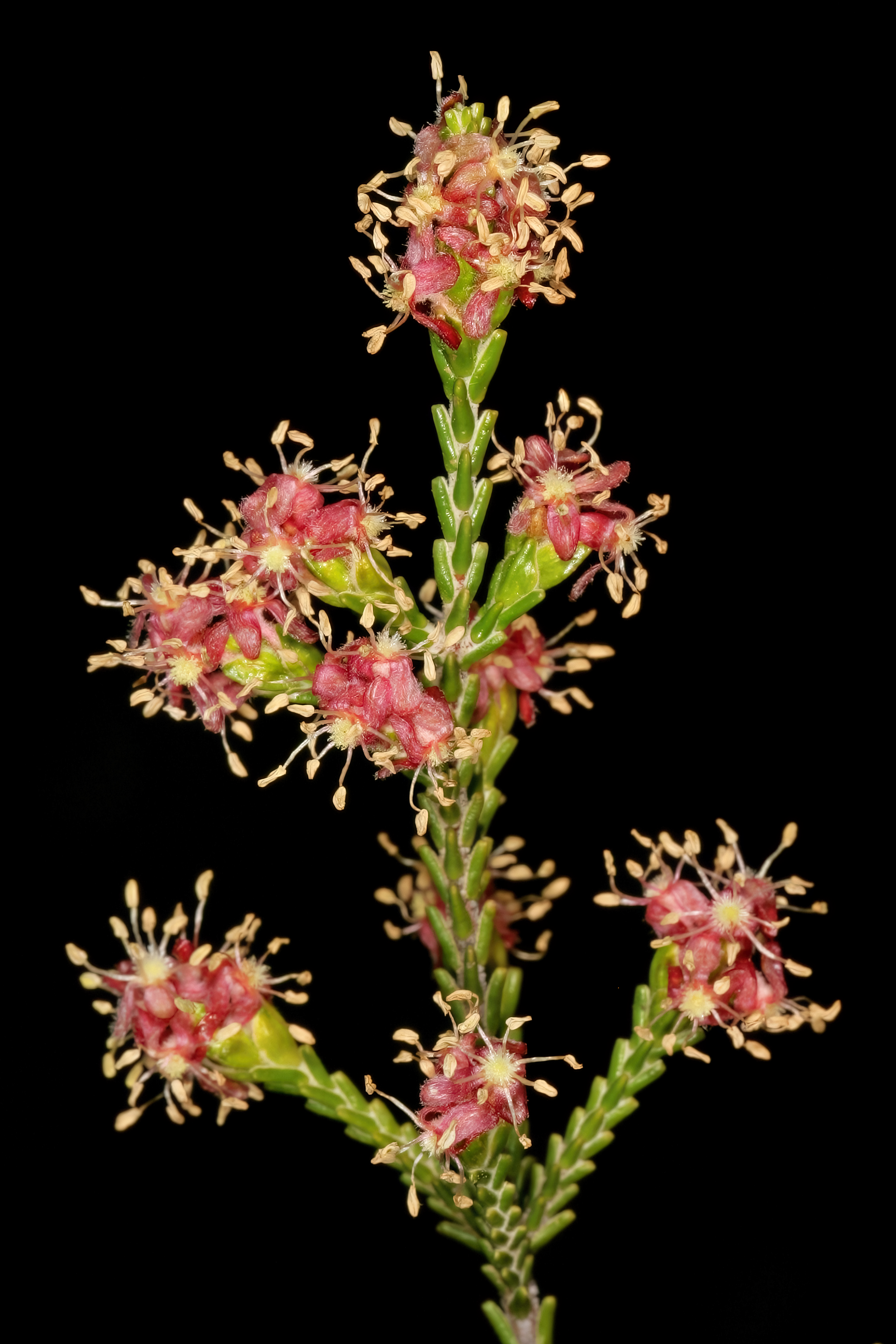

Scientific classification
- Kingdom: Plantae
- Clade: Tracheophytes
- Clade: Angiosperms
- Clade: Eudicots
- Clade: Rosids
- Order: Malvales
- Family: Thymelaeaceae
- Genus: Passerina
- Species: P. truncata

Binomial name
- Passerina truncata (Meisn.) Bredenk. & A.E.van Wyk, (2002)

Synonyms
- Passerina rigida var. truncata Meisn.

= Passerina truncata =

Species of flowering plant

Passerina truncata is a shrub belonging to the genus Passerina. The species is endemic to South Africa and occurs in the Northern Cape, Eastern Cape and Western Cape.

The plant has two subspecies:

- Passerina truncata subsp. monticola Bredenk. & A.E. van Wyk
- Passerina truncata subsp. truncata
