= Passerina pendula =

Scientific classification
- Kingdom: Plantae
- Clade: Tracheophytes
- Clade: Angiosperms
- Clade: Eudicots
- Clade: Rosids
- Order: Malvales
- Family: Thymelaeaceae
- Genus: Passerina
- Species: P. pendula

Binomial name
- Passerina pendula Eckl. & Zeyh. ex Thoday

Synonyms
- Passerina rigida var. comosa Meisn.

Species of flowering plant

Passerina pendula is a shrub belonging to the genus Passerina. The species is endemic to South Africa and occurs in the Eastern Cape and the Western Cape.
