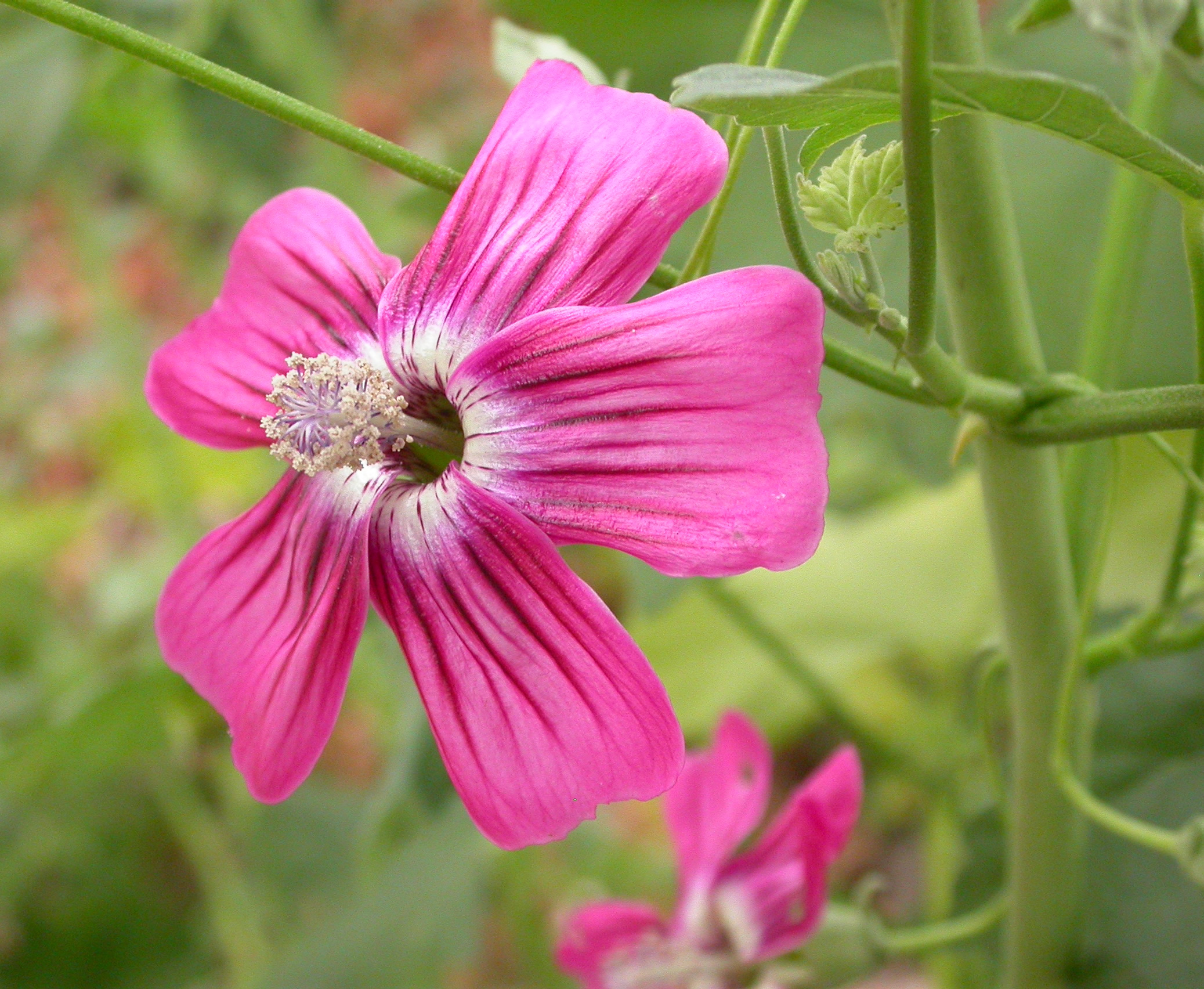

Conservation status
- Critically Imperiled (NatureServe)

Scientific classification
- Kingdom: Plantae
- Clade: Tracheophytes
- Clade: Angiosperms
- Clade: Eudicots
- Clade: Rosids
- Order: Malvales
- Family: Malvaceae
- Genus: Malva
- Species: M. assurgentiflora

Binomial name
- Malva assurgentiflora (Kellogg) M.F. Ray

Synonyms
- Lavatera assurgentiflora Kellogg; Saviniona assurgentiflora (Kellogg) E. Greene; Saviniona suspensa (Kellogg) E. Greene; Saviniona clementina E. Greene; Saviniona reticulata E. Greene

= Malva assurgentiflora =

Island mallow

Species of tree

Malva assurgentiflora, formerly classified as Lavatera assurgentiflora, the island mallow, mission mallow, royal mallow, malva rosa island mallow, island tree mallow or malva rosa ('pink mallow') in Spanish, is a species of flowering plant in the mallow family.

== Description ==
Malva assurgentiflora is a sprawling perennial herb or bushy shrub generally exceeding a meter tall and approaching four meters in maximum height. The leaves are up to 15 centimeters long and wide and are divided into 5 to 7 toothed lobes.

The showy flowers have five dark-veined deep pink petals which are somewhat rectangular in shape and 2.5 to 4.5 centimeters long. The disc-shaped fruit is divided into 6 or 8 segments each containing a seed.

== Distribution ==
It is endemic to southern California, where it is native only to the Channel Islands. It can also be found growing as an escapee from cultivation in localized spots in coastal mainland California and Baja California, as well as sparingly in locations in Guatemala, cooler regions in mountainous or Mediterranean areas in western South America, New Zealand and Australia.

== Uses ==
Malva assurgentiflora has been grown in California for a very long time as an ornamental plant and as a windbreak.
