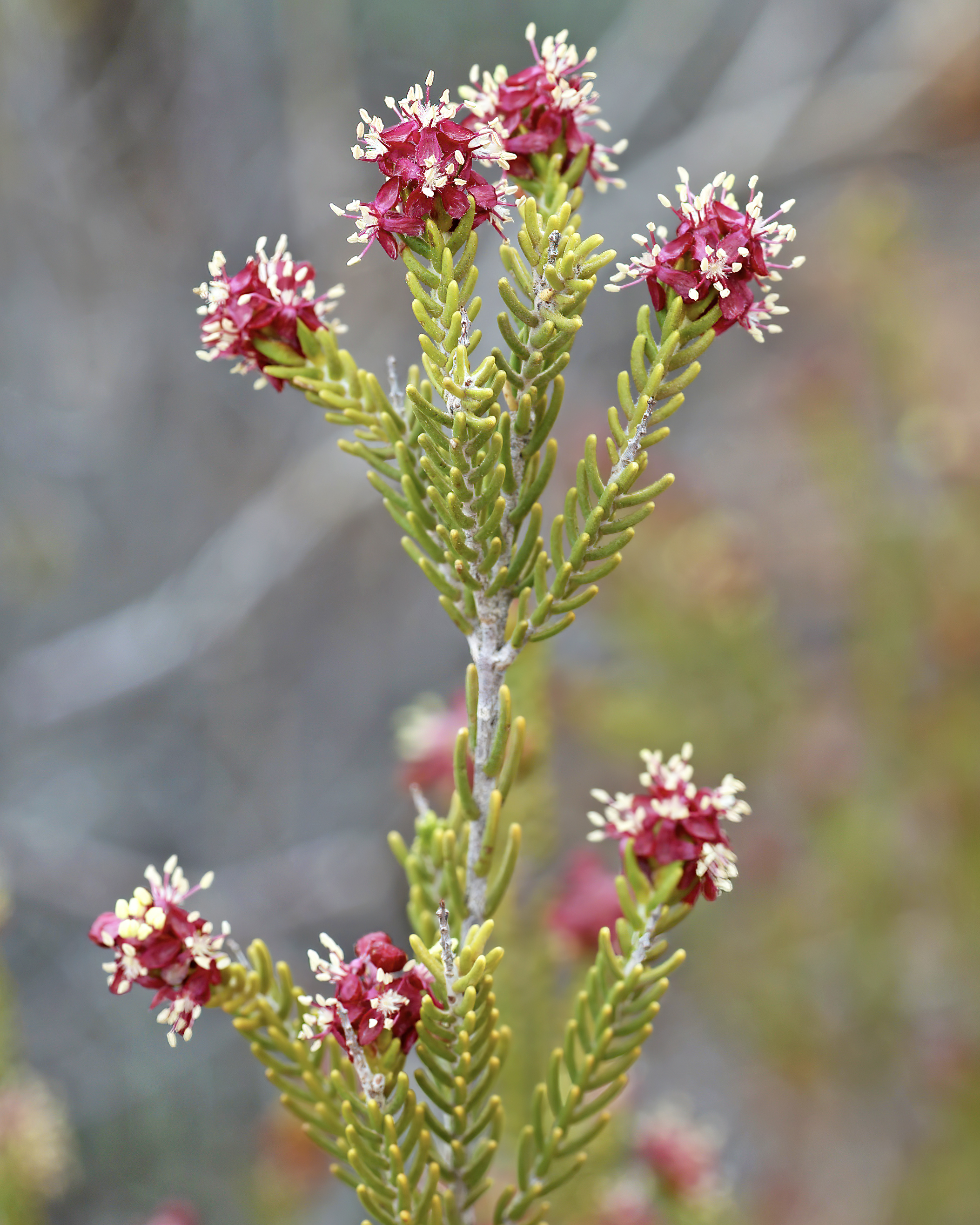
- Passerina obtusifolia from Rooiberg Nature Reserve, South Africa

Scientific classification
- Kingdom: Plantae
- Clade: Tracheophytes
- Clade: Angiosperms
- Clade: Eudicots
- Clade: Rosids
- Order: Malvales
- Family: Thymelaeaceae
- Subfamily: Thymelaeoideae
- Genus: Passerina; L.

Species
- 21; see text

Synonyms
- Balendasia Raf. (1838); Chymococca Meisn. (1857); Sanamunda Adans. (1763), nom. superfl.

= Passerina (plant) =

Genus of flowering plants

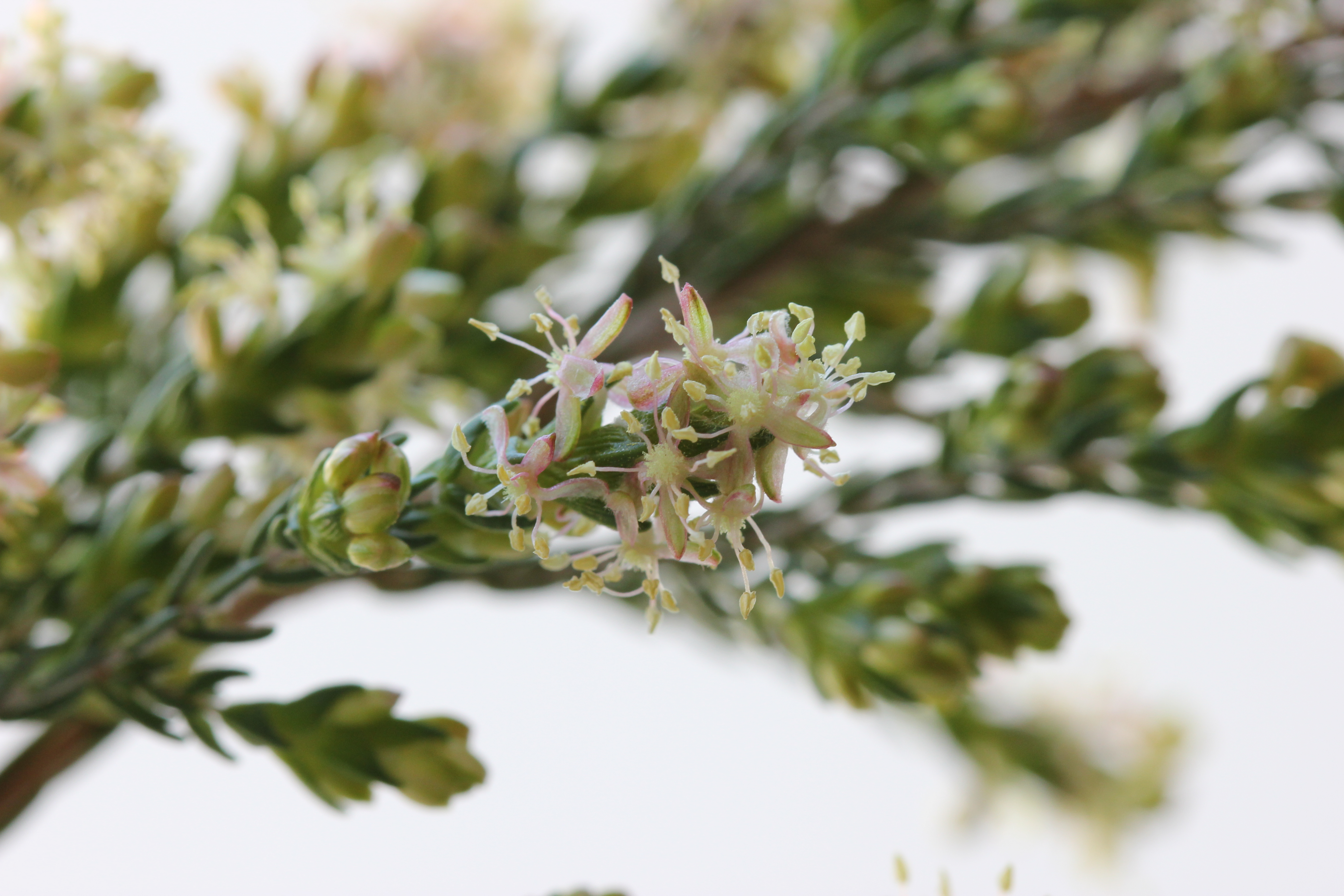
Passerina details of flowers

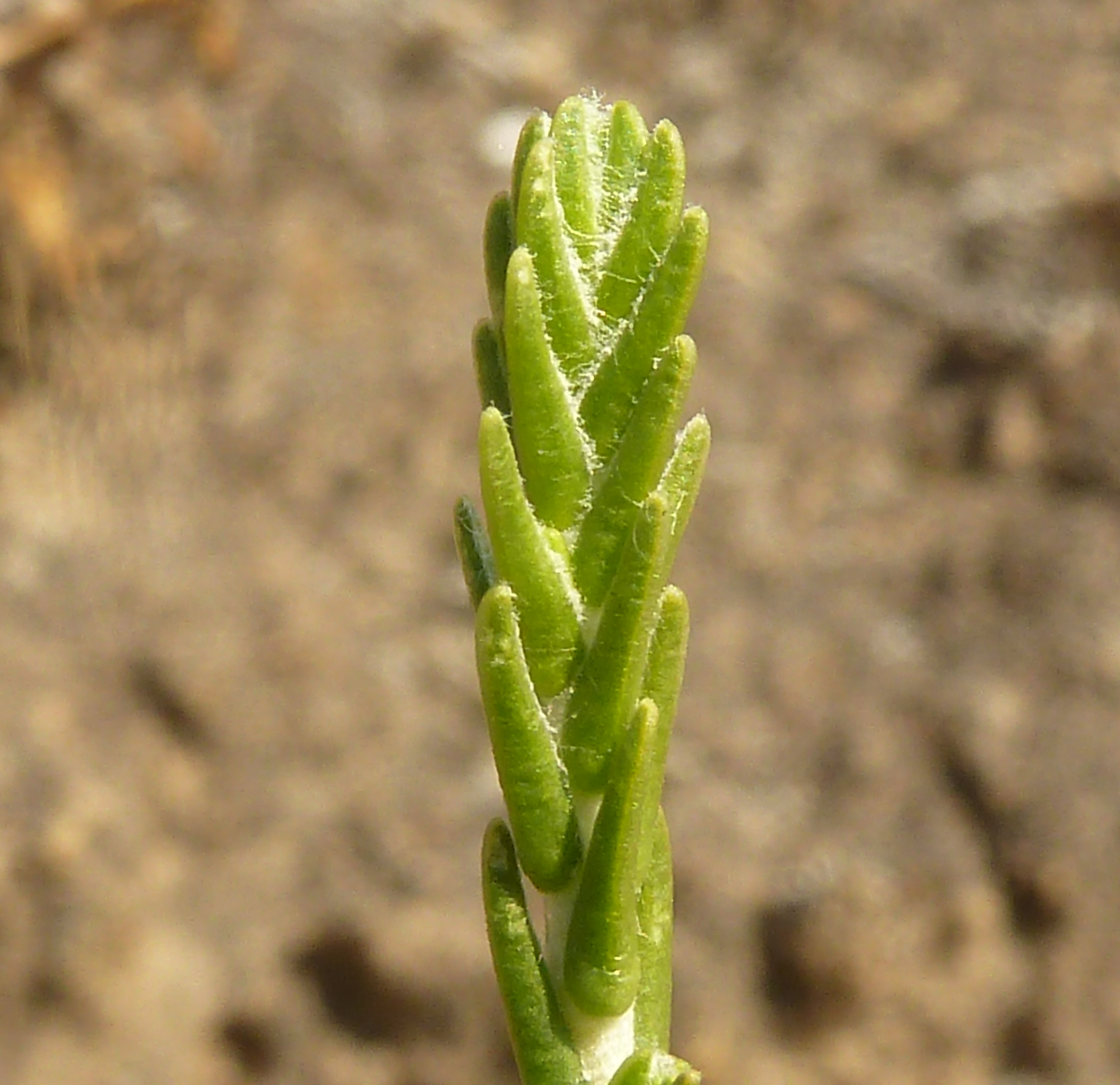
P. montana twig, showing decussate leaves

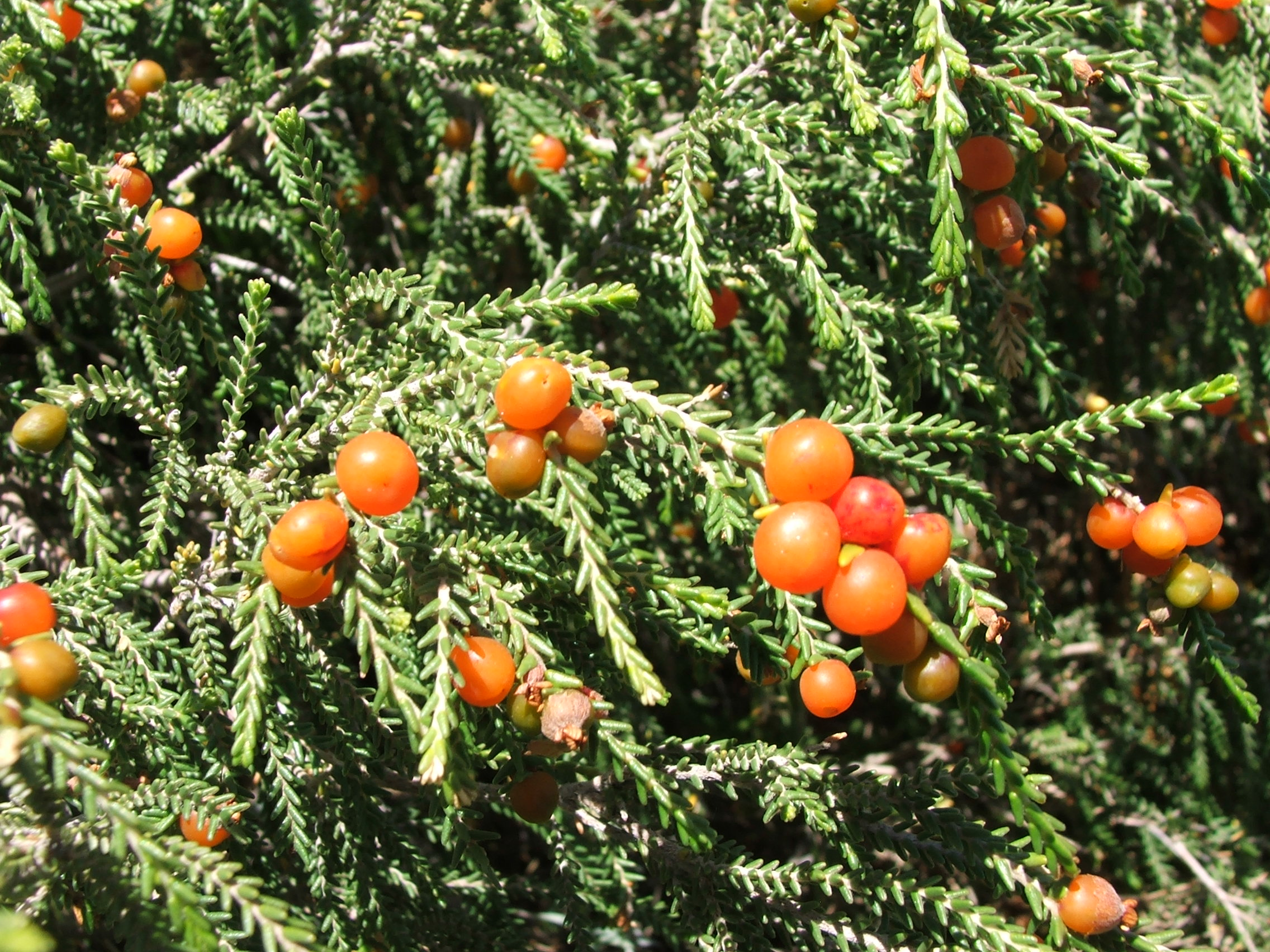
Passerina ericoides, the Christmas Berry in fruit

Passerina is a genus in the plant family Thymelaeaceae, native to southern Africa. They are ericoid bushes growing largely in fynbos and other Southern African scrub habitats.

== Etymology ==
The genus name Passerina derives from the Latin word passer "sparrow"—given the plants in reference to a perceived similarity in the shape of the fruit to a sparrow's beak—more evident in the Thymelaceous plant Thymelaea hirsuta (formerly placed in the genus Passerina).

== Taxonomy ==
Passerina L., Sp. Pl. 559 (1753); Wright in FC. 5, 2: 9 (1915); Thoday in Kew Bull. 1924: 146, 387 (1924). Chymococca Meissn., Wright 1.c. 14, is a genus of plants in the family Thymelaeaceae.

== Description ==
Members of the genus Passerina are ericoid shrubs or shrublets, often with a tendency to having pendulous branches. Their leaves are markedly decussate. They are concave or closely involute, lined with woolly hairs, and cling to leafy stems without being large enough to cover them. This gives the plants a characteristic plaited or corded appearance.

The flowers of some species are borne in terminal spikes, whereas other species bear them in a four-flowered head. Bracts, usually broader than leaves and larger than the flowers, subtend each flower. This is one helpful distinction between specimens of Passerina and plants in the genus Struthiola. The calyx has four sepals, forming a flask-shaped or subcylindrical tube. At the mouth the sepals spread into lobes that are shorter than the tube. There are no petals, but the lobes of the sepals are quite colourfully petal-like in many species. The ovary is ovoid with a single loculus containing a solitary ovule. The style is lateral, bearing a mop-like stigma that fills the mouth of the calyx-tube. The calyx is persistent and encloses the fruit except in species such as Passerina ericoides, in which the fruit is berry-like and expands until it protrudes out of the tube. A flower bears eight stamens of unequal length, the longest being the length of the calyx-lobes, but all protrude out of the calyx. The flowers lack of any noticeable scent, their protruding stamens, and their mop-like stigmata suggest their adaptation to wind pollination, in contrast to the petals and night scent of Struthiola.

In most species the fruit is membranous, but some species, e.g. Passerina ericoides have a fleshy pericarp, forming a red berry attractive to birds and tortoises, hence one of its common names, "skilpadbessie", meaning "tortoise berry". However, that name also is applied to other plants, such as Muraltia spinosa. The seeds have a black, crustaceous testa and curved, beak-like micropyle.

As in the related Struthiola, the beak-like aspects of the fruit inspired the name "Passerina", which is from the Latin passerinus, meaning "sparrow-like".

== Distribution ==
The genus is endemic to Southern Africa, most species within South Africa, though some extend north of the border. The greatest concentration of species is in Cape fynbos, where some species are endemic to very small regions. Passerina ericoides for example occurs naturally only on the Cape Peninsula and the vicinity of False Bay

== Species ==
There are 21 accepted species in the genus Passerina.

- Passerina burchellii Thoday
- Passerina comosa (Meisn.) C.H. Wright
- Passerina corymbosa Eckl. ex C.H. Wright
- Passerina drakensbergensis Hilliard & B.L. Burtt
- Passerina ericoides L.
- Passerina esterhuyseniae Bredenkamp & A.E. van Wyk
- Passerina falcifolia (Meisn.) C.H. Wright
- Passerina filiformis L.
- Passerina galpinii C.H. Wright
- Passerina montana Thoday
- Passerina montivaga Bredenkamp & A.E. van Wyk
- Passerina nivicola Bredenkamp & A.E. van Wyk
- Passerina obtusifolia Thoday
- Passerina paleacea Wikstr.
- Passerina paludosa Thoday
- Passerina pendula Eckl. & Zeyh. ex Thoday
- Passerina quadrifaria Bredenkamp & A.E. van Wyk
- Passerina rigida Wikstr.
- Passerina rubra C.H. Wright
- Passerina ternata Magee & Euston-Brown
- Passerina truncata (Meisn.) Bredenkamp & A.E. van Wyk

== Ecological and commercial significance ==
Passerina is a generally insignificant genus, seldom noticed by the non-botanist. The attractive ericoid habit and fuss-free growth make it a useful subject in informal fynbos gardens. Being wind-pollinated, the plants generally are not of much importance to pollinating organisms such as bees and birds.

The Khoisan name gonna refers to the use of its tough bark, together with that of related plants, for binding such items as thatch. The material certainly is remarkably tough and has been used for plaiting into whip thongs. The Khoisan use of a decoction of some species for treating pain, plus the fact that many species of the Thymelaeaceae suggests that the material might be pharmacologically active, but there is no suggestion that the plants cause harm to stock. However, this harmlessness might well be for the same reason that the plants generally are of no value as forage for browsers, namely that they are unpalatable to stock.
