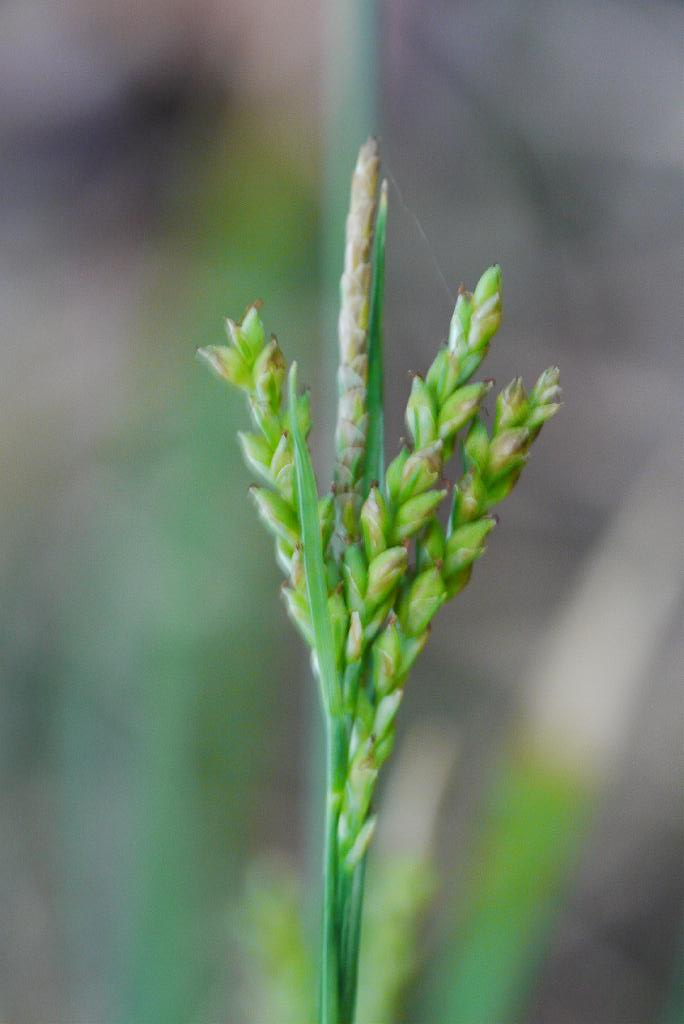
- Inflorescence, showing the three female spikelets

Scientific classification
- Kingdom: Plantae
- Clade: Tracheophytes
- Clade: Angiosperms
- Clade: Monocots
- Clade: Commelinids
- Order: Poales
- Family: Cyperaceae
- Genus: Carex
- Species: C. tristachya

Binomial name
- Carex tristachya Thunb.

Synonyms
- Carex pocilliformis Boott; Carex tristachya subsp. pocilliformis (Boott) T.Koyama

= Carex tristachya =

Species of flowering plant

Carex tristachya, called the shiny-spike sedge, is a species of flowering plant in the genus Carex, native to south-central and southeast China (including Hainan and Taiwan), Korea, Japan, the Ryukyus, the Philippines, Borneo, and New Guinea. Its seeds are dispersed by ants.

== Subtaxa ==
The following varieties are currently accepted:

- Carex tristachya var. pocilliformis (Boott) Kük. – whole range, except Hainan
- Carex tristachya var. tristachya – Japan, Korea, southeast China, Hainan
