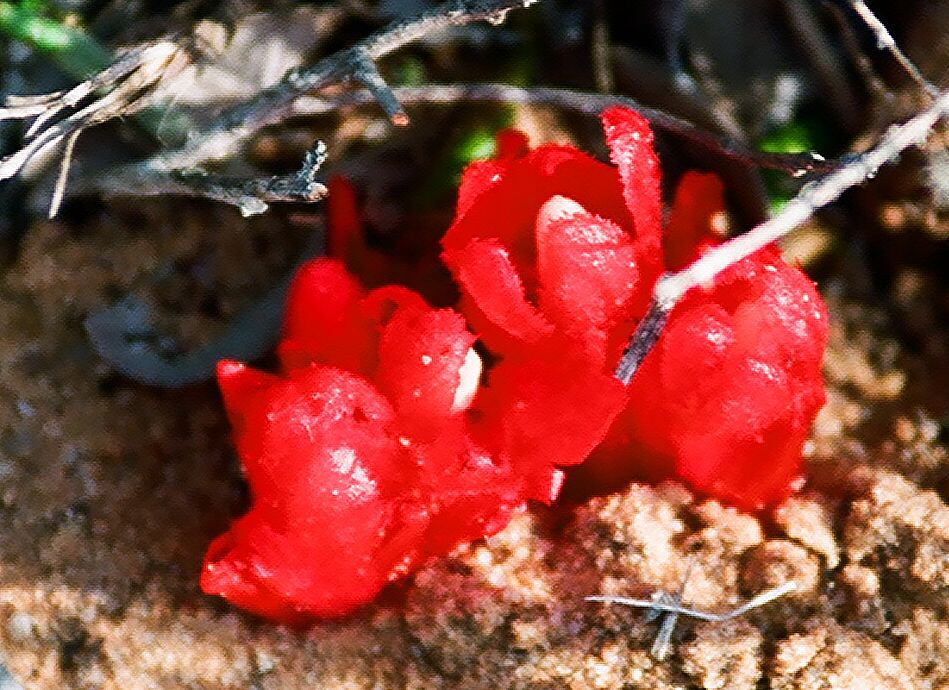
- Cytinus sanguineus, Hondeklipbaai, South Africa

Scientific classification
- Kingdom: Plantae
- Clade: Tracheophytes
- Clade: Angiosperms
- Clade: Eudicots
- Clade: Rosids
- Order: Malvales
- Family: Cytinaceae
- Genus: Cytinus
- Species: C. sanguineus

Binomial name
- Cytinus sanguineus (Thunb.) Fourc.

= Cytinus sanguineus =

Species of flowering plant

Cytinus sanguineus is a species of parasitic plant in the family Cytinaceae.

== Pollinator ==
This species has been observed being pollinated by Nectarinia famosa
