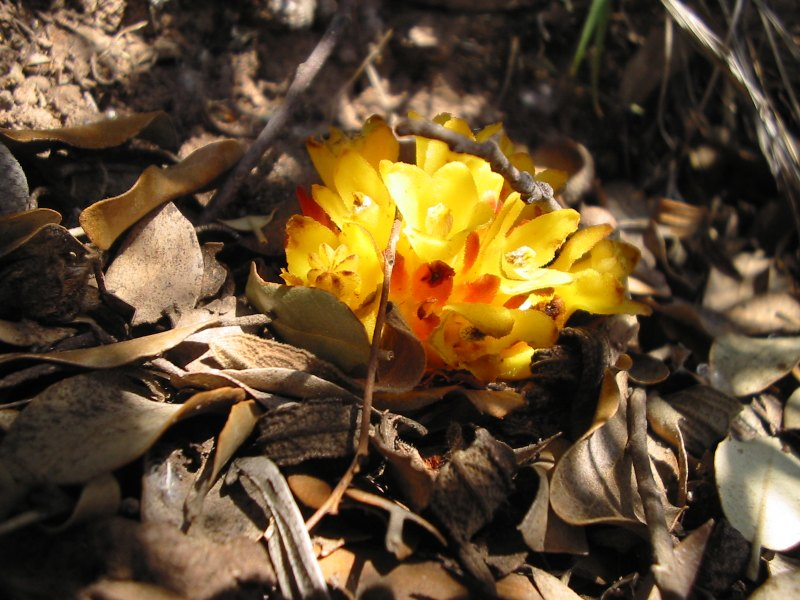
- C. hypocistis growing under a bush in leaf litter, near Fréjus in the south of France

Scientific classification
- Kingdom: Plantae
- Clade: Tracheophytes
- Clade: Angiosperms
- Clade: Eudicots
- Clade: Rosids
- Order: Malvales
- Family: Cytinaceae
- Genus: Cytinus
- Species: C. hypocistis

Binomial name
- Cytinus hypocistis (L.) L.

Subspecies
- Cytinus hypocistis subsp. hypocistis (autonym); C. h. subsp. macranthus Wettst.; C. h. subsp. orientalis Wettst.; C. h. subsp. pityusensis Finschow

Synonyms
- Asarum hypocistis L. (basionym)

= Cytinus hypocistis =

Species of plant

Cytinus hypocistis is an ant-pollinated species of obligate parasitic plant in the family Cytinaceae having four subspecies, which is parasitic on Cistus (rock-rose) species. It is found primarily in locations that surround the Mediterranean Sea, and is the type for the genus Cytinus. The binomial has been conserved.

== Description ==
Cytinus hypocistis is an endophytic root holoparasite that has no chlorophyll, external roots, leaves, or stems. It is a perennial that spends most of its life completely inside the root tissue of its host, and the flowers of Cytinus hypocistis are the only component of the parasite that can be seen emerging from the host root during their reproductive season. The sweet smelling inflorescence above ground is visited by many species of ants that pollinate it.

== Distribution ==
Cytinus hypocistis is native to Albania; Algeria; Crete; Croatia; Cyprus; Greece; France (including Corsica); Palestine; Italy (including Sardinia and Sicily); Lebanon; Libya; Malta; Morocco; Portugal; Spain (including both the Balearic and Canary Islands); Syria; Tunisia; and Turkey.

The subspecies C. h. subsp. macranthus is native to Portugal and western Spain; C. h. subsp. orientalis is native to southern Greece and Crete; and C. h. subsp. pityusensis is endemic to Ibiza of the Balearic Islands.

== Habitat ==
Cytinus hypocistis lives within the roots of its host and relies on the rock-roses it infests as a source of water and nutrients. As a result of feeding on the nutrients of the host plant, Cytinus hypocistis has a negative impact on productivity, seed viability, and overall reproductive ability in the white rockroses (Cistus albidus) that it parasitizes.

Tenebrionid beetles (Pimelia costata) disperse the seeds of Cytinus hypocistis by ingesting them and then excreting them in favourable underground germination sites.

== Uses ==
Cytinus hypocistis has been used in traditional medicine to treat dysentery and tumors of the throat, and has been used for its astringent qualities.
