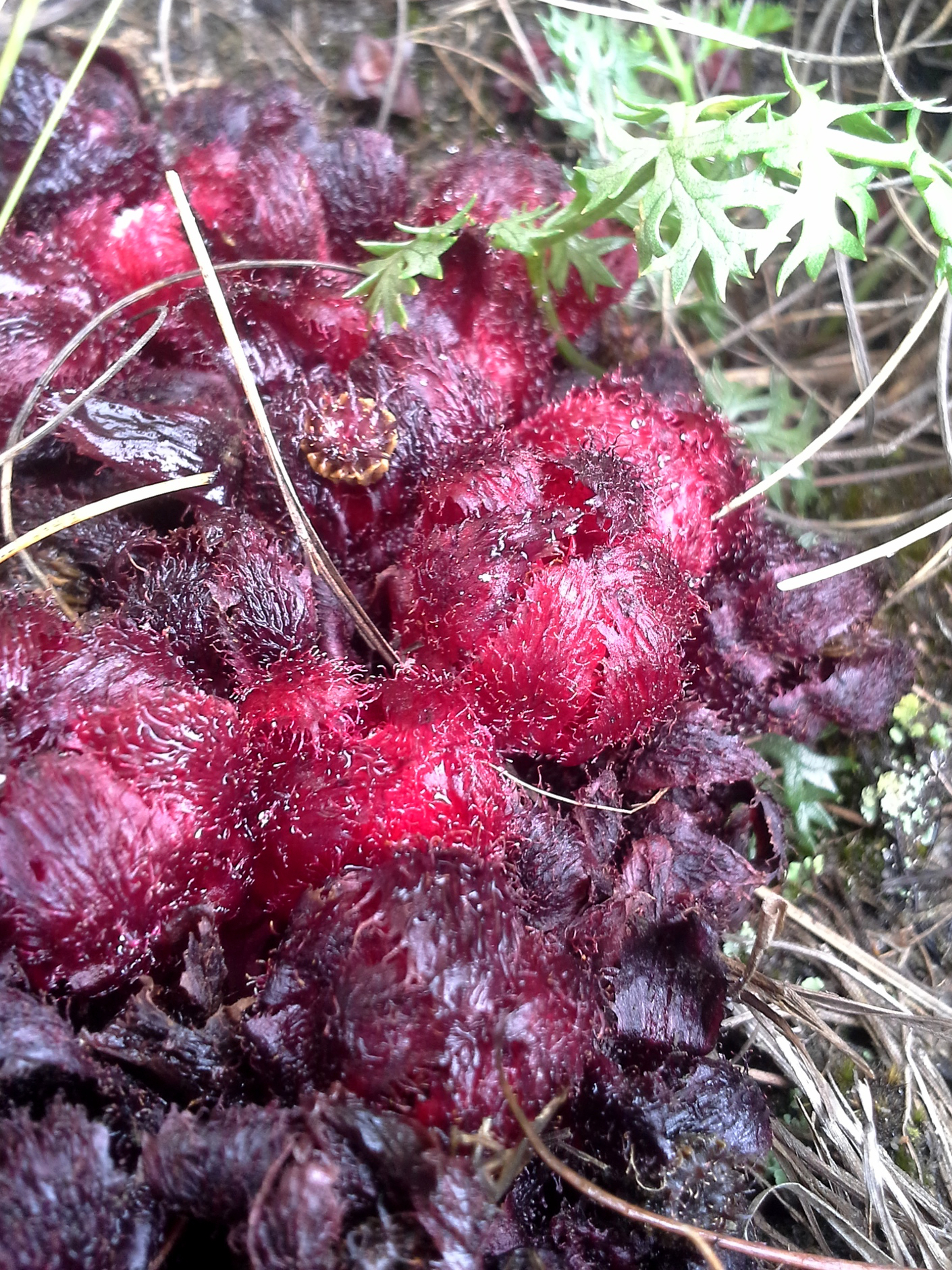
- Cytinus visseri at 2160 m altitude near Ehlanzeni, Mpumalanga, South Africa

Scientific classification
- Kingdom: Plantae
- Clade: Tracheophytes
- Clade: Angiosperms
- Clade: Eudicots
- Clade: Rosids
- Order: Malvales
- Family: Cytinaceae
- Genus: Cytinus
- Species: C. visseri

Binomial name
- Cytinus visseri Burgoyne

= Cytinus visseri =

Species of flowering plant

Cytinus visseri, commonly known as the Northern vampirecup, is a holoparasitic flowering plant in the family Cytinaceae, native to northeastern South Africa. It is parasitic on several species of plants, but primarily Helichrysum reflexum, a woody shrub in the family Asteraceae.

== Etymology ==
This flower was first discovered by Johann Visser but he was unable to name it himself due to his early death. Following recognition of his discovery, the species was officially named after him by Prix Burgoyne.

== Description ==
Cytinus visseri is an erect, perennial, and a dioecious species. It lacks a true root system but forms endophytic cells inside the roots of the host plant and grows out of the host's primordium, bearing red flowers at its tip. They can grow up to 30-120mm high with a seed size of 0.2 – 0.4 mm long.

== Distribution ==
Cytinus visseri is native to South Africa, where it can be seen in areas of rocky outcrops in Long Tom Pass in Mpumalanga province, Limpopo province, and Eswatini.

== Habitat and ecology ==
The South African species of Cytinus are not host-specific parasites, and use Helichrysum reflexum, (Asteraceae), and more rarely on Cliffortia repens (Rosaceae) and Phylica paniculata (Rhamnaceae). When H. reflexum is infected, it is rare that more than one C. visseri plant infects the same host plant. They are commonly located under the dense canopy of the host where its flowering is synchronised with the host's flowering period.

== Pollination and seed dispersal ==
Pollination is by using scent cues to lure ground-dwelling mammals. Due to location, scent cues are more effective in manipulating behaviour in mammalian ground-dwellers. Mammals that assist in pollination are the elephant shrews (Elephantulus brachyrhynchus), the striped field mouse (Rhabdomys pumilio), and the Pygmy mouse (Mus minutoides). The scent is chemically derived into two substances: 1-hexen-3-one and 3-hexaone. The first substance is used primarily to attract the pollinators. The latter is a strong repellant but when both substances are released, the net effect attracts the mammals.

The method of seed dispersal is by mammalian faecal disposal. Lizards have also been observed to assist this flower in seed dispersal.
