= Dispersal vector =

Transporters of biological dispersal units

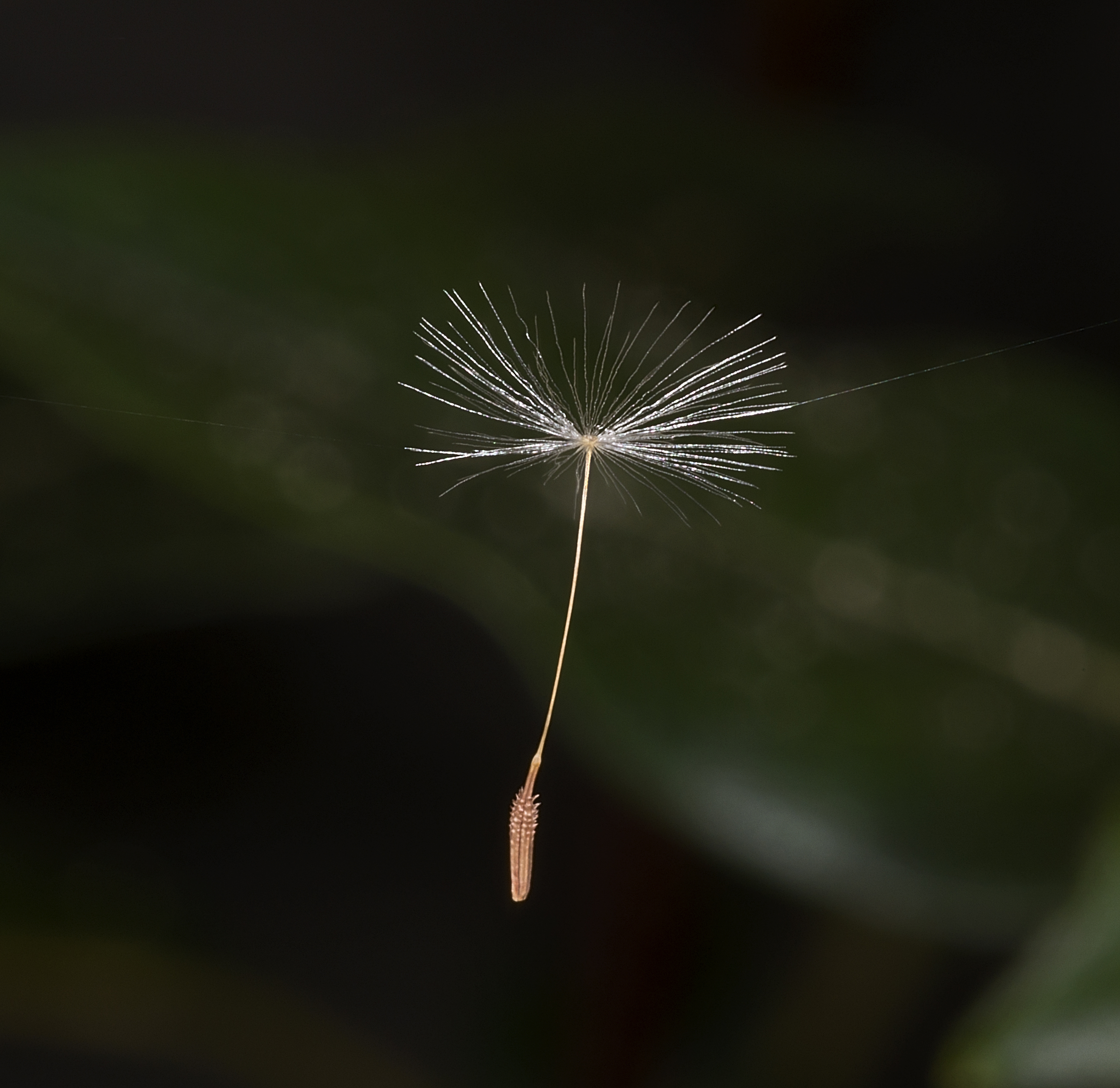
Dandelion seeds are adapted to wind dispersal.

A dispersal vector is an agent of biological dispersal that moves a dispersal unit, or organism, away from its birth population to another location or population in which the individual will reproduce. These dispersal units can range from pollen to seeds to fungi to entire organisms.

There are two types of dispersal vector, those that are active and those that are passive. Active dispersal involves pollen, seeds and fungal spores that are capable of movement under their own energy. Passive dispersal involves those that rely on the kinetic energy of the environment to move. In plants, some dispersal units have tissue that assists with dispersal and are called diaspores. Some types of dispersal are self-driven (autochory), such as using gravity (barochory), and does not rely on external agents. Other types of dispersal are due to external agents, which can be other organisms, such as animals (zoochory), or non-living vectors, such as the wind (anemochory) or water (hydrochory).

In many cases, a dispersal unit will be dispersed by more than one vector before reaching its final destination. It is often a combination of two or more modes of dispersal that act together to maximize dispersal distance, such as wind blowing a seed into a nearby river, that will carry it farther down stream.

== Self-generated dispersal ==
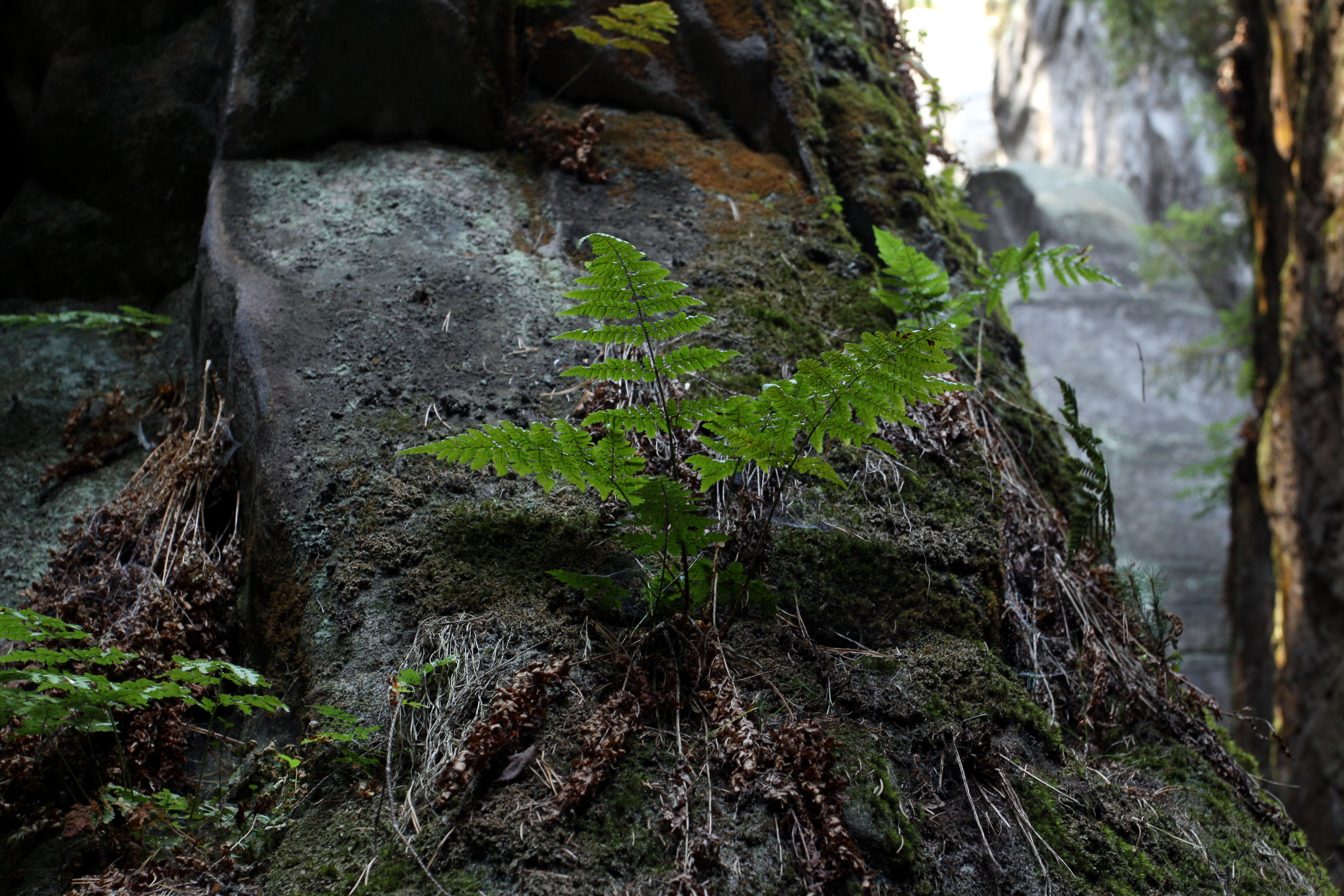
In leptosporangiate ferns, the fern catapults its spores 1-2 cm so they can be picked up by a second dispersal vector, often the wind.

Autochory is the dispersal of diaspores, which are dispersal units consisting of seeds or spores, using only the energy provided by the diaspore or the parent plant. The plant of origin is the dispersal agent itself, instead of an external agent. There are five main types of autochory that act on such seeds or spores: ballochory, or violent ejection by the parent organism; blastochory, or crawling with horizontal runners; barochory, or relying on gravity for dispersal; herpochory, or crawling with fine hair-like structures called trichomes; or being pushed or twisted into the ground by hygromorphic awns in response to humidity changes, e.g. Erodium cicutarium.

In some cases, ballochory can be more effective when combined with a secondary dispersal vector: ejecting the seeds or spores in order for them to use wind or water for longer distance dispersal.

== Animal dispersal ==
Dispersal by animals is called zoochory. Zoochory can be specified by which animal is acting as a dispersal vector. Animals are an important dispersal vector because they provide the ability to transfer dispersal units longer distances than their parent organism can. The main groups include dispersal by birds (ornithochory), dispersal by ants (myrmecochory), dispersal by mammals (mammaliochory), dispersal by amphibians or reptiles, and dispersal by insects, such as bees.

Animals are also a large contributor to pollination via zoophily. Flowering plants are mainly pollinated by animals, and while invertebrates are involved in the majority of that pollination, birds and mammals also play a role.

=== Ornithochory ===
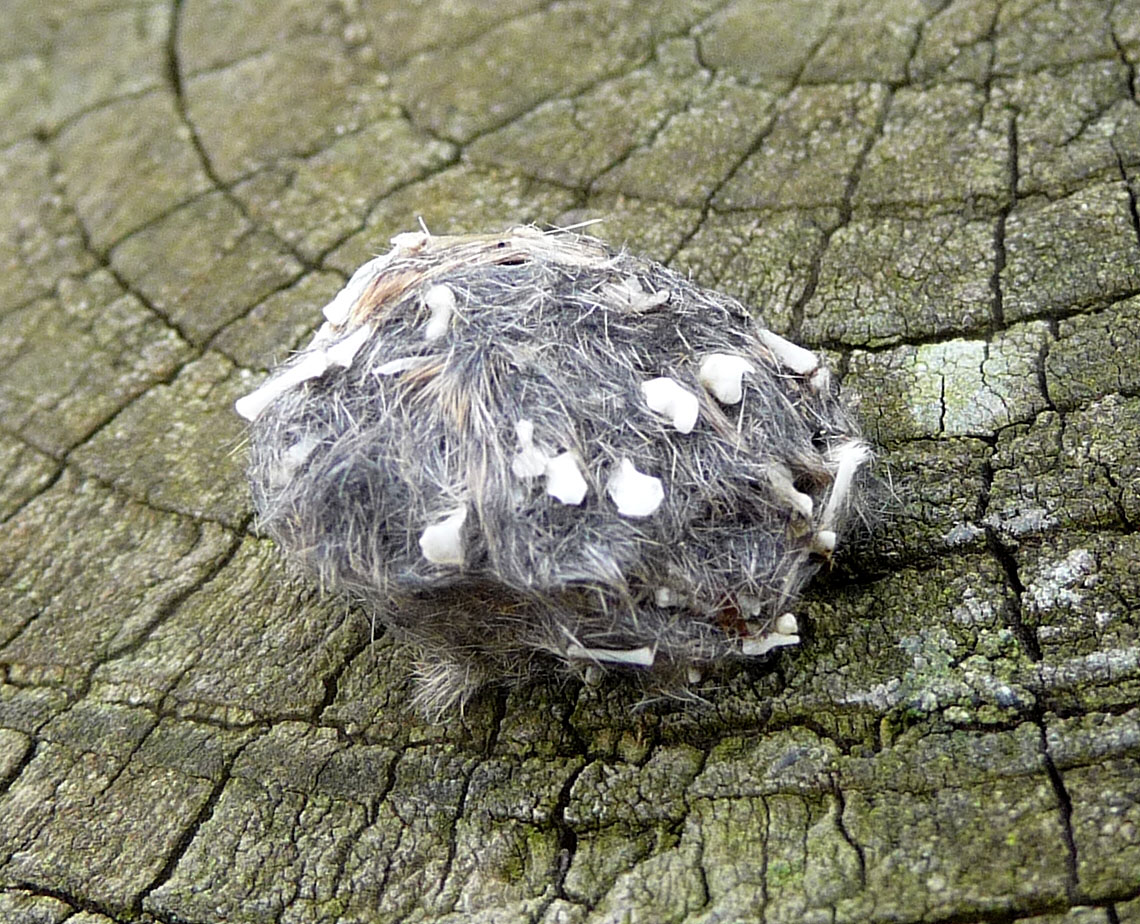
Barn owl pellets containing pouched mouse remains have been found to contain germinating seeds.

Birds contribute to seed dispersal in several ways that are unique from general vectors. Birds often cache, or store, the seeds of trees and shrubs to consume later. Only some of these seeds are later recovered and eaten, so many of the seeds are able to use the behavior of seed storage to allow them to germinate away from the mother tree.

Long-distance dispersal is rarely achieved by a parent plant alone. It could then be mediated by the migratory movements of birds. Long-distance dispersal operates over areas that span thousands of kilometres, allowing it to promote rapid range shifts and determine species distributions.

In seed dispersal, ingestion of seeds that can resist digestive juices allows such seeds to be scattered in faeces and dispersed far from the parent organism. For these seeds, passing through the gut makes them more able to germinate when they are ingested by birds and mammals.

Finally, the ingestion of herbivores by carnivores may help disperse seeds as they prey on primary seed dispersers such as herbivores or omnivores. When a bird is eaten by a cat or another carnivore, that animal will inadvertently consume the seeds that the prey species ate. These seeds may then be later deposited in a process called diplochory, where a seed is moved by more than one dispersal agent. This greatly affects seed dispersal outcomes as carnivores range widely and make dispersed populations have more connected genes.

Birds act as dispersal vectors for its other types as well. Hummingbirds spread pollen on their beaks, and fungal spores may stick to the bottom of birds' feet. Water birds may also help to disperse aquatic invertebrates, specifically branchiopods, ostracods, and bryozoans.

=== Myrmecochory ===
This includes all of the dispersal caused by ants, including seed dispersal and the dispersal of leaves from trees.

=== Mammaliochory ===
Like birds, mammals disperse units over long distances, especially through carnivores. When carnivores eat herbivores they connect different populations of the same species. This is because predators have larger ranges than their prey. Mammals have been shown to act as dispersal vectors for seeds, spores, and parasites.

Just as in ornithocory, ingestion by herbivores helps to disperse seeds, and gut passage increases the rate of germination.

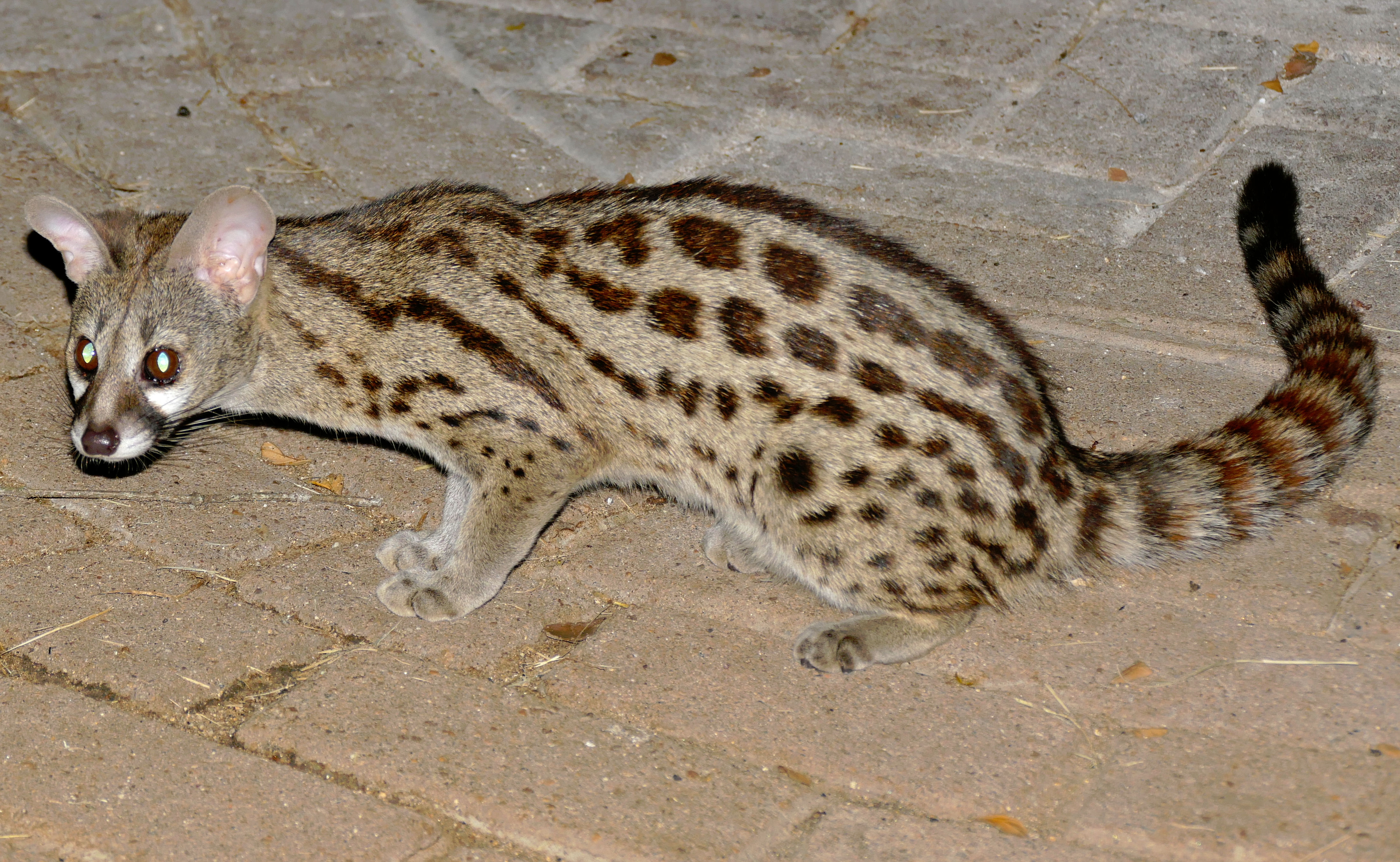
Cape genets have been found to act as pollinators when they drink nectar from flowers.

Marsupials, primates, rodents, bats, and some species in the suborder Feliformia (Cape grey mongooses and Cape genets) all have been found to be pollinators. Non-flying mammals have been discovered to act as pollinators in Australia, Africa, South and Central America. Some plants may have traits that evolved with mammals to use them as dispersal vectors, such as having an extremely bad-smelling odour, producing nectar at night, and developing flowers that can handle rough feeders. The pollen of some plants can be stuck to the fur of mammals and accidentally ingested when nectar is consumed.

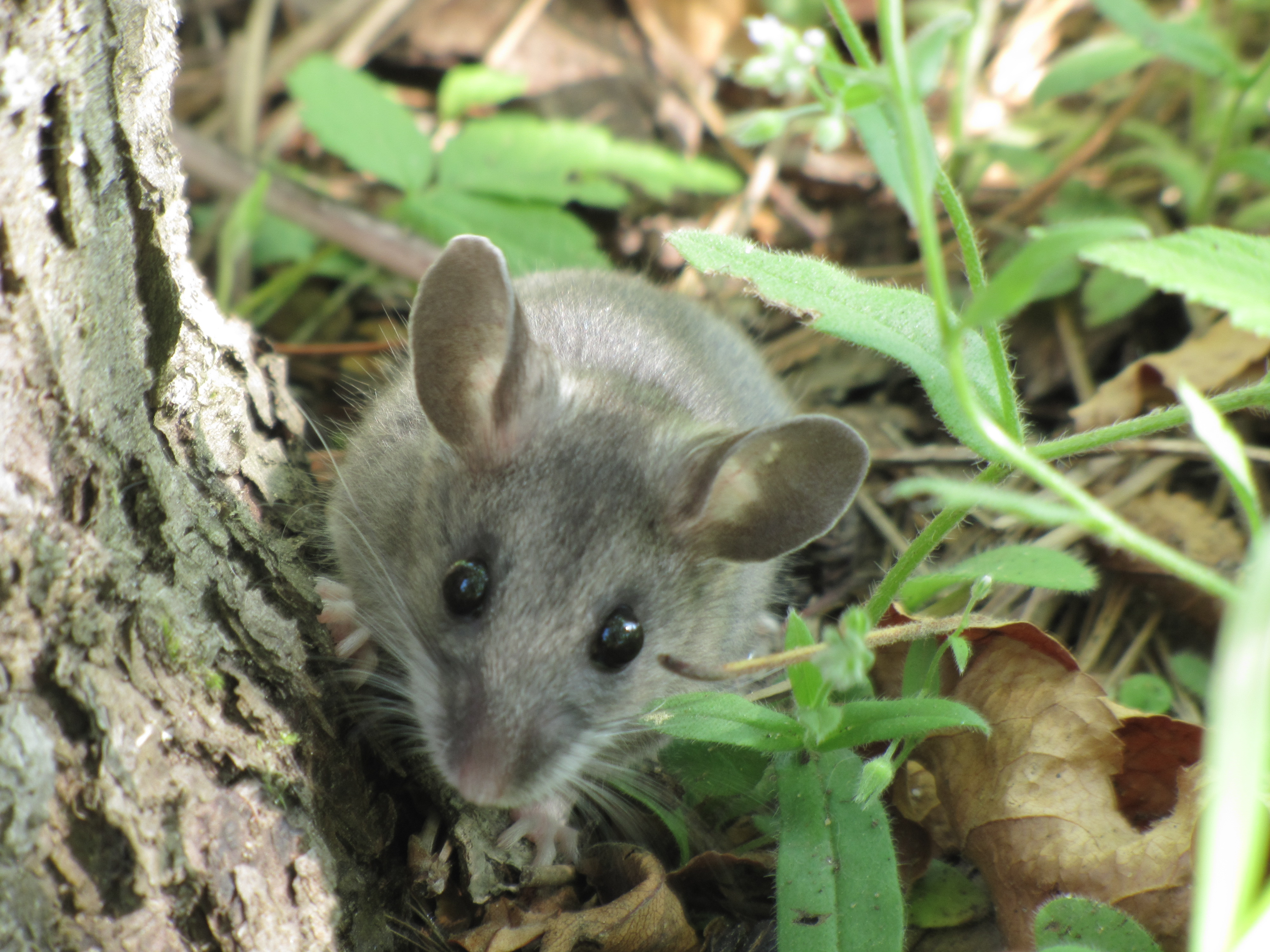
Diaspores from 6 different bryophytes have been found on the fur of American red squirrels, Northern flying squirrels, and deer mice.

Mammals contribute to bryophyte and fern spore dispersal by carrying spores on their fur. Small mammals acting as dispersal vectors may have advantages for the dispersing organism compared to wind transport, as the mammals share similar ecosystems to the parent plant, while wind transport is random. Additionally, mammals can transport spores that have qualities such as low production and non-wind adapted morphology that wouldn't be conducive for wind transport.

Dik-dik, (Madoqua kirkii), Grant's gazelle (Gazella granti), and impala (Aepyceros melampus) all become infected by nematode parasites in their guts that lay on vegetation the antelope consume. Once infected, they disperse nematode parasites in their feces. Once consumed, the eggs are spread to a new are when small mounds of dung are passed out.

=== Dispersal by amphibians or reptiles ===
Frogs and lizards have been found to be dispersal vectors for crustaceans and ring worms, specifically bromeliad ostracods (Elpidium bromeliarum) and annelids (Dero superterrenus). Annelids are chemically attracted to moist frog skin. This might have developed to reduce the risk of dehydration during environmental transport. The ostracods attach themselves to frogs in order to colonise new areas. Both ostracods and annelids will attach themselves to lizards as well, but they prefer to attach themselves to frogs.

=== Dispersal by Invertebrates ===
One of the most important examples of dispersal via invertebrates are pollinators such as bees, flies, wasps, beetles, and butterflies.

Invertebrates may also act as dispersal vectors for the spores of ferns and bryophytes via endozoochory, or the ingestion of the plant.

== Wind dispersal ==
Anemochory is dispersal of units by wind. Wind is a major agent of long distance dispersal that helps to spread species to new habitats. Each species has its own "wind dispersal potential". This is the proportion of dispersal units (seeds, spores or pollen) that travel farther than a specific distance travelled under normal weather conditions. Its effectiveness relies on the wind conditions and the adaptations of the dispersal units. The two main traits of plants that predict their wind dispersal potential are falling velocity and initial release height of the dispersal unit. Seeds that fall faster are generally heavier. They have a lower wind dispersal potential as they need a stronger wind to carry them. The taller the initial release height of the dispersal unit, the higher the wind dispersal potential as there is a larger range where it can be picked up by the wind.

=== Structural adaptations ===
Many species have evolved structural adaptations to maximize wind dispersal potential. Common examples include plumed, winged, and balloon-like diaspores.

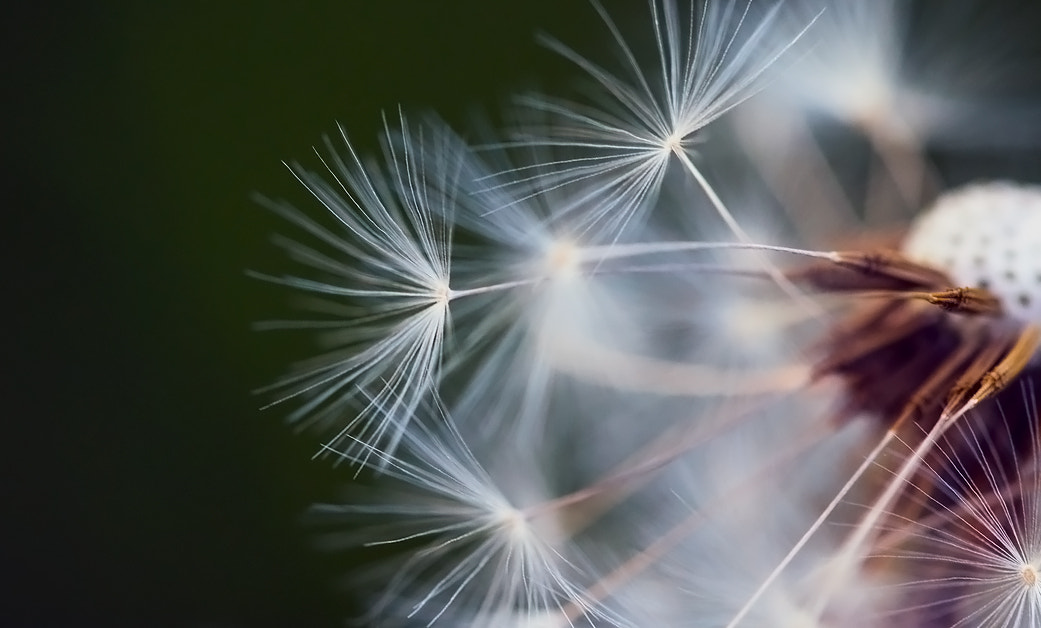
Plumed diaspores of the dandelion, Taraxacum officinale.

Plumed diaspores have thin hair-like projections that lift them up higher. One of the most common plumed species is the dandelion, Taraxacum officinale. The wind dispersal potential of plumed species are directly related to the total mass and total surface area of the projected plume.

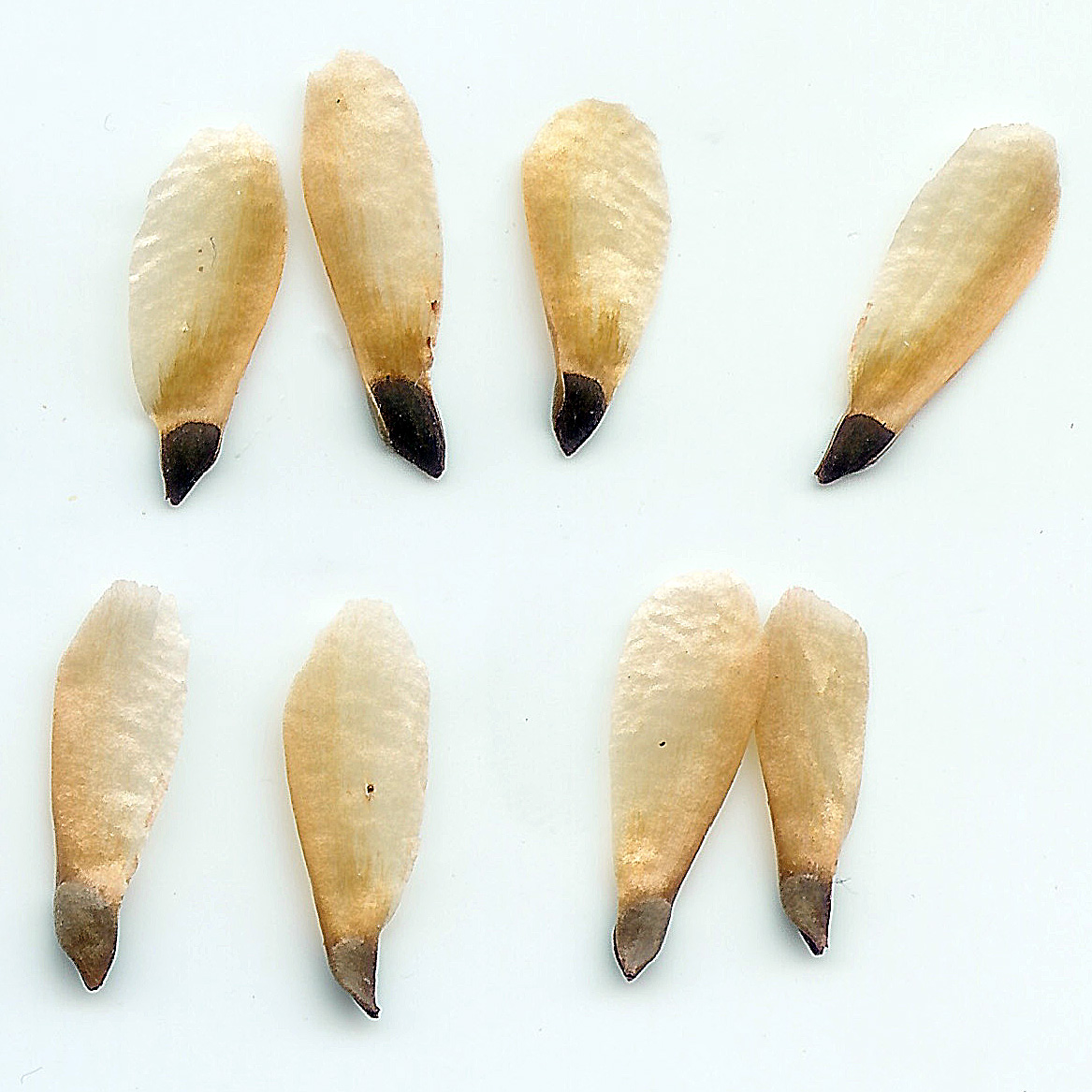
Winged seeds of the Norway spruce, Picea abies.

Winged diaspores have fibrous tissue that develops on the wall of the seed and projects outward. Seed wings are believed to have evolved together with larger seeds, in order to increase their dispersal and offset the weight of the larger seeds. Some common examples include pine and spruce trees.

Balloon-like seeds are a phenomenon where the calyx, a kind of protective pouch or covering the plant uses to guard the seeds, is light and swollen. This balloon-like structure allows the entire pouch of seeds to be dispersed by gusts of wind. A common example of the balloon-like diaspore is the Trifolium fragiferum, or strawberry clover.

=== Human effects on anemochory ===
Wind dispersal of a particular species can also be affected by human actions. Humans can affect anemochory in three major ways: habitat fragmentation, chemical runoff, and climate change.

Clearing land for development and building roads through forests can lead to habitat fragmentation. Habitat fragmentation reduces the number and size of the effected populations, reducing the amount of seeds that are dispersed. This, therefore, lowers the probability that dispersed seeds with germinate and take root.

Chemical runoff from fertilizers, leakages of sewage, and carbon emissions from fossil fuels can also lead to eutrophication, a build up of nutrients that often leads to excess algae and invasive plant growth. Eutrophication can lead to decreased long distance dispersal because the lack of nutrients to native plants causes a decrease in seed release height. However, because of the lowered release height, eutrophication can sometimes lead to an increase in short distance dispersal.

Global warming effects on wind patterns can increase average wind velocity. However, it can also lead to lower levels of wind dispersal for each individual plant or organism since global warming affects the normal conditions needed for plant growth, such as temperature and rainfall.

== Water dispersal ==
Hydrochory is dispersal using water, including oceans, rivers, streams, and rain. It affects many different dispersal units, such as seeds, fern spores, zooplankton, and plankton.

Water sources surrounded by land tend to be more restricted in their ability to disperse units. Barriers such as mountain ranges, farm land, and urban centers prevent the relatively free movement of dispersal units seen in open bodies of water. Oceanic dispersal can move individual dispersal units or reproductive propagules anywhere from a mere to hundreds of kilometers from the original point depending on the size of each one.

=== Marine dispersal ===
A majority of marine organisms reproduce using ocean currents and movement within the water column. The process of releasing potential offspring into the water is called broadcast spawning. While it requires parents to be relatively close to each other for fertilization, the fertilized zygotes can be moved extremely far. A number of marine invertebrates require ocean currents to connect their gametes once broadcast spawning has occurred. Kelp, an important group of sea plants, primarily use ocean currents to distribute their spores offspring. Many coral species reproduce by releasing gametes into the water column expecting other local corals to do the same before the original gametes are dispersed by ocean currents.

Some non-submerged aquatic plant species, like palm trees and mangroves, have developed fruits that float on sea water in order to use ocean currents to disperse them. Coconuts have been found to travel up to thousands of miles away from their parent tree due to their buoyant nature. Over 100 species of vascular plants use this dispersal method for their fruit.

Many plants have evolved with specific adaptations to maximize the distance that seeds, fruits, or propagules are dispersed in the ocean. To better protect them against sinking in the water column, some seeds have developed hair or slime on their outer seed coats. Seeds filled with air, cork, or oil are better prepared to float for farther distances.

Another aspect of dispersal comes from waves and tides. Organisms in shallower waters, such as seagrasses, are crashed upon by waves and pulled out by tides into the open ocean.

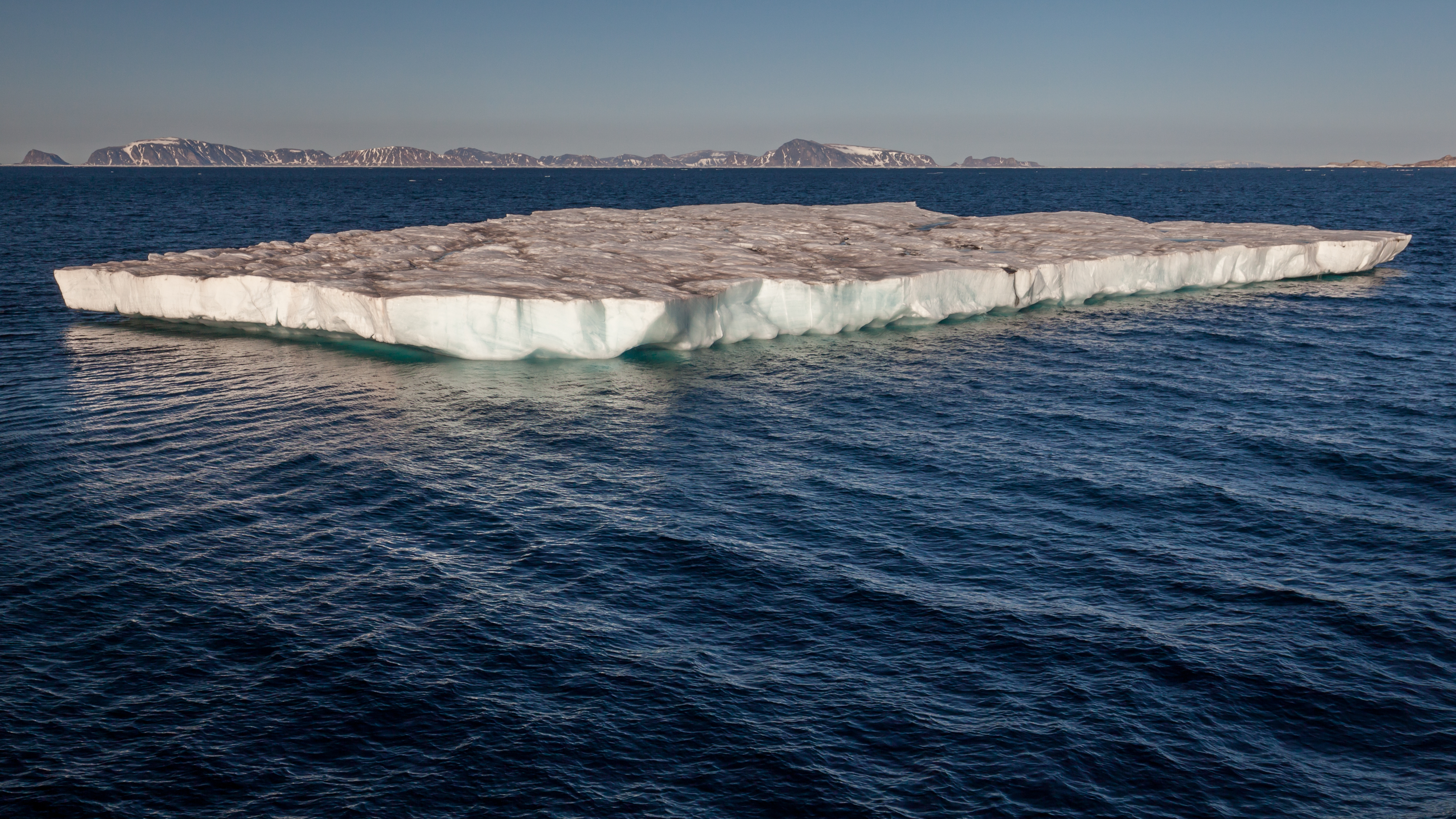
An iceberg that may act as a raft for Arctic invertebrates.

Some smaller marine organisms maximize their own dispersal by attaching to a raft - a biotic or abiotic object that is being moved by the ocean's currents. Biotic rafts can be floating plant parts, such as seeds, fruits, and leaves. Abiotic rafts are usually floating woods or plastics, including buoys and discarded trash.

Sea ice is also an important dispersal vector. Some arctic species rely on sea ice to disperse their eggs, like Daphnia pulex. Drifting, as discussed above, can help marine mammals move efficiently. It has been shown that intertidal invertebrates at the deepest part of their habitats will travel up to multiple kilometers using sea ice.

=== Freshwater dispersal ===
Freshwater dispersal mainly occurs through flowing water transporting dispersal units. Permanent water bodies need outside forms of dispersal to retain biodiversity, so hydrochory via freshwater is vital for the success of landlocked water sources. Lakes remain genetically diverse thanks to rivers connecting them to new sources of biodiversity. In lakes that lack connecting rivers, some organisms have developed adaptations that use the wind, while in a water body, to disperse reproductive units. In these cases, the dispersal units are moved to new aquatic habitats by utilizing the wind instead of the water in their habitat.

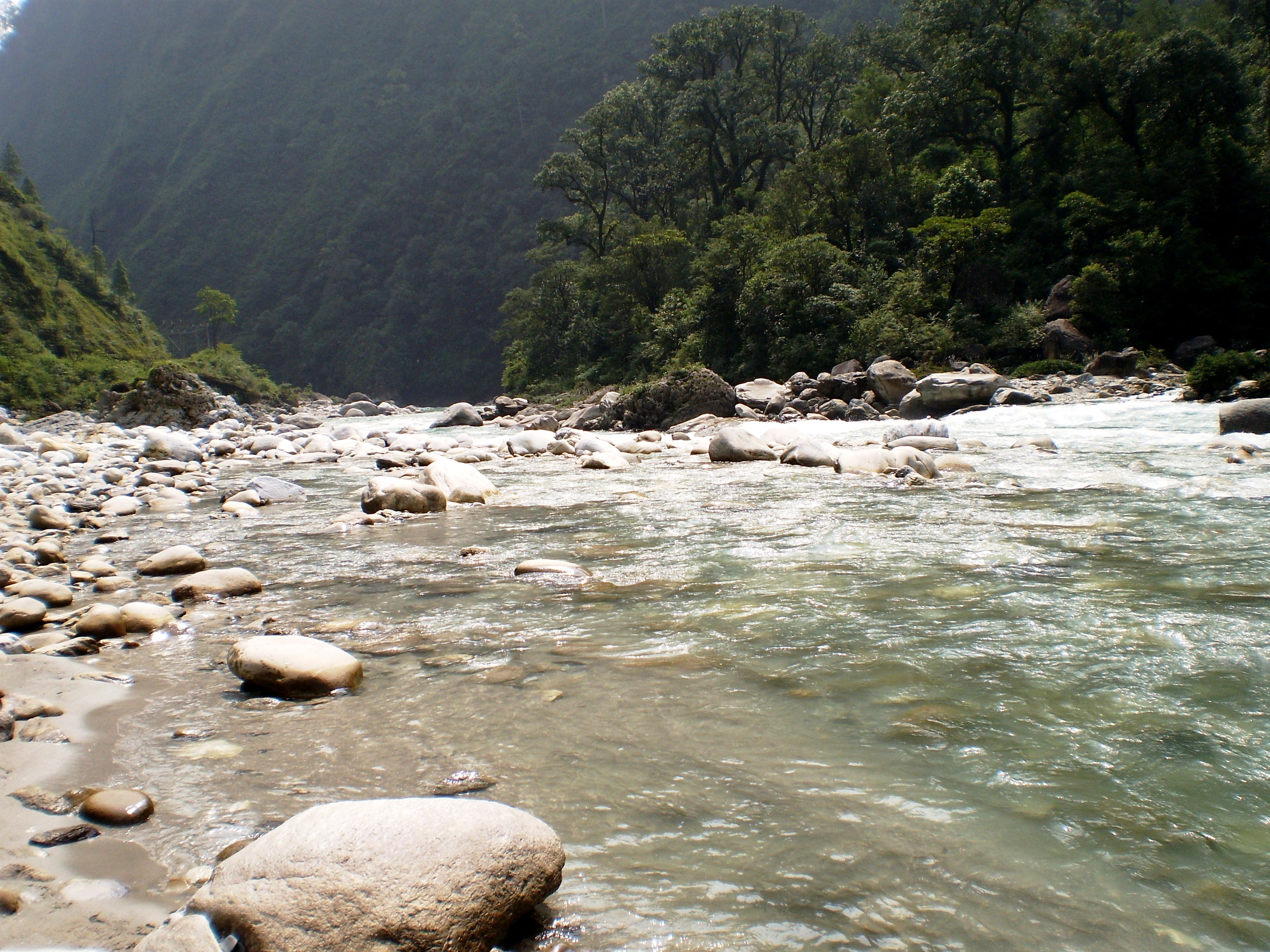
Flowing rivers can help to disperse plant matter and invertebrates.

Running water is the only form of long distance dispersal present in freshwater sources, so rivers act as the main aquatic terrestrial dispersal vector. Like in marine ecosystems, organisms take advantage of flowing water via passive transport of drifting along on a raft. The distance traveled by floating or drifting organisms is dependent on the amount of time that organism or unit is able to be buoyant.

Freshwater is important for the dispersal of non-aquatic terrestrial organisms as well. Bryophytes require an external source of water in order to sexually reproduce. Some of them use falling rain drops to disperse their spores as far as possible.

=== Extreme weather ===
Extreme weather events (tropical cyclones, floods and heavy rains, hurricanes, and thunderstorms) are the most intense examples of water functioning as a vector. The heavy and intense rain that comes with these events facilitate long distance dispersal.

Overflows are side effects of heavy rains impacting one specific area. They have been proven to be effective in increasing biodiversity in temporary lakes and ponds. The overflow of pool water can be an important passive form of hydrochory when it (pool water) acts as an agent. Floods also displace plants and organisms, whether or not overflow occurs. Flood pulses can transport aquatic plants and organisms as small as zooplankton.

Hurricanes can also be dispersal vectors. After the 2004 Hurricane Charley struck Florida, more propagules of red mangrove trees were dispersed. If a hurricane strikes in the later summer months, more propagules can be expected to be dispersed. However, early hurricanes can wash out immature propagules and decrease the dispersal of mature propagules for that season.

When extreme weather events occur over an open body of water, they can create intense waves. These waves can create large dispersal within the water column by changing local water movement. But they also make smaller organisms disperse a shorter distance.

=== By humans ===
The fishing industry has introduced new ways of water dispersal. The water in bait buckets transfers bait everywhere a fisher takes it, and this can introduce non-native species into areas if this bait water is spilt. This idea is applied on a much larger scale to the ballast tanks of ships. A study done by James Carlton of Williams College reports that more than 3000 species are moving across the ocean in ballast tanks on any given day.

Artificial waterways created by humans have also spurred new types of water dispersal. Amphipods were found to be able to cross areas that could not be crossed before to enter a new drainage pipe due to a newly constructed canal. Such waterways not only connect communities that are geographically close, but they also transmit invasive species from distant communities. The distribution of invasive species is, in part, regulated by local ocean conditions and currents.

The introduction of human-generated waste, like wood planks and plastic bags, into water sources has increased the number of usable rafts for dispersal.

== Human-mediated dispersal ==
We have been acting as dispersal vectors since we began moving around the planet, introducing non-native plants and animals with us. As trends in urbanisation have increased, urban environments help to disperse seeds and bring invasive species with us. Many non-native species exist in urban environments and they can move in and out of urban areas very quickly. This leads to them spreading much more quickly to neighboring environments.

== See also ==
- Seed dispersal
- Basal shoot
- Myrmecochory
- Oceanic dispersal
- Biological dispersal
- Diplochory
- Diaspore (botany)
- Disseminule
- Zoophily
- Pollination
- Pollinator
