= Bdallophytum =

Scientific classification
- Kingdom: Plantae
- Clade: Tracheophytes
- Clade: Angiosperms
- Clade: Eudicots
- Clade: Rosids
- Order: Malvales
- Family: Cytinaceae
- Genus: Bdallophytum; Eichler, 1872

Species
- See text

Synonyms
- Bdallophyton

Genus of flowering plants

Bdallophytum is a genus of parasitic flowering plants with five described species. It parasitizes on the roots of plants of the genus Bursera, such as Bursera simaruba. The genus is endemic to the Neotropics.

It was previously placed in Rafflesiaceae, but is now placed in family Cytinaceae, together with the only other genus Cytinus. Some Bdallophytum species were at one time considered to belong to this latter genus.

Bdallophytum is dioecious.

== Name ==
The genus name is probably derived from Ancient Greek bdell- "leech" and phyton "plant". It was later misspelled as Bdallophyton by Eichler, and this synonym is now also in common use.

== Species ==
- Bdallophytum americanum
- Bdallophytum andrieuxii
- Bdallophytum bambusarum
- Bdallophytum ceratantherum
- Bdallophytum oxylepis
