= Seed dispersal =

Movement or transport of seeds away from the parent plant

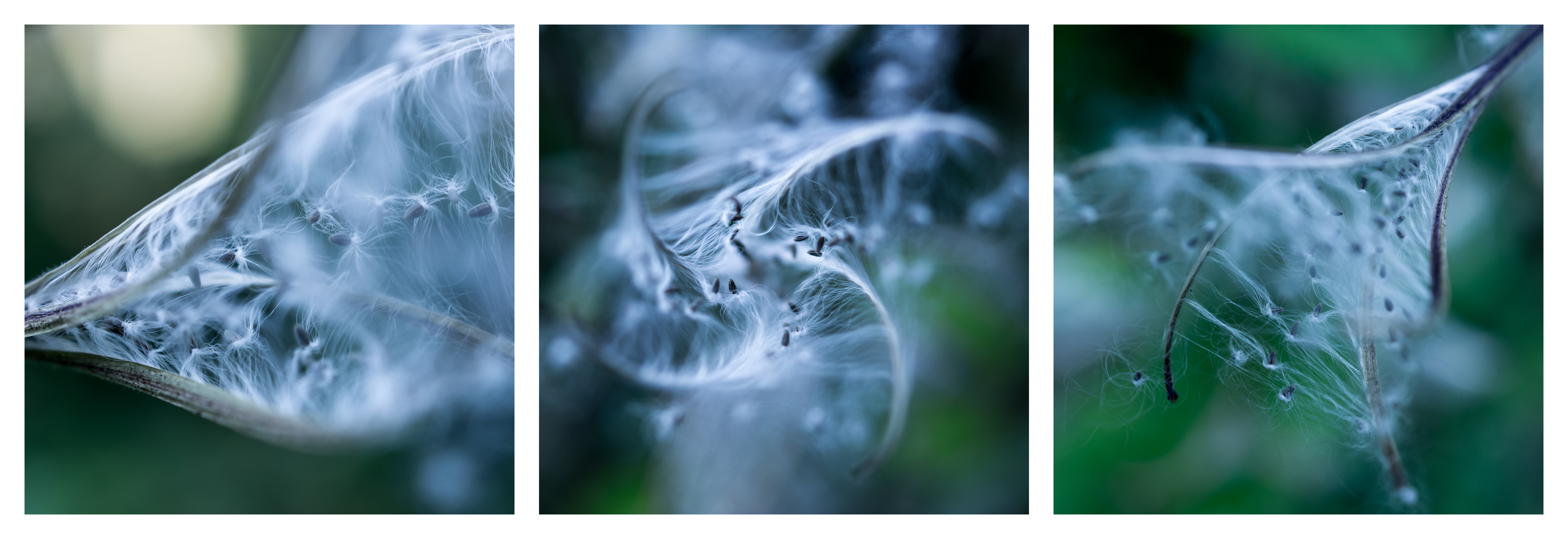
Epilobium hirsutum seed head dispersing seeds

In spermatophytic plants, seed dispersal is the movement, spread or transport of seeds away from the parent plant. Plants have limited mobility and rely upon a variety of dispersal vectors to transport their seeds, including both abiotic vectors, such as wind and water, and living (biotic) vectors such as birds and mammals. Seeds can be dispersed away from the parent plant individually or collectively, as well as dispersed in both space and time.

The patterns of seed dispersal are determined in large part by the dispersal mechanism and this has important implications for the demographic and genetic structure of plant populations, as well as migration patterns and species interactions. Seed dispersal may be achieved through the use of gravity, water, wind, or animals. It can also be achieved through explosive dehiscence. Some plants are serotinous and only disperse their seeds in response to an environmental stimulus. These modes are typically inferred based on adaptations, such as wings or fleshy fruit. However, this simplified view may ignore complexity in dispersal. Plants can disperse via modes without possessing the typical associated adaptations and plant traits may be multifunctional.

== Evolutionary benefits ==
Seed dispersal is likely to have several benefits for different plant species. Seeds are more likely to survive the farther they are from the parent plant. This higher survival rate may result from the actions of density-dependent seed and seedling predators and pathogens, which often target the high concentrations of seeds found beneath parent plants. Competition with adult plants may also be lower when seeds are deposited a distance away from their parent.

Seed dispersal also allows plants to reach specific habitats that are favorable for survival, a hypothesis known as directed dispersal. For example, Ocotea endresiana (Lauraceae) is a tree species from Latin America which is dispersed by several species of birds, including the three-wattled bellbird. Male bellbirds perch on dead trees in order to attract mates, and often defecate seeds beneath these perches where the seeds have higher probabilities of survival because of better light conditions and escape from fungal pathogens. In the case of fleshy-fruited plants, seed-dispersal in animal guts (endozoochory) often enhances the amount, the speed, and the asynchrony of germination, which can have important plant benefits.

Seeds dispersed by ants (myrmecochory) are not only dispersed short distances but are also buried underground by the ants. These seeds can thus avoid adverse environmental effects such as fire or drought, reach nutrient-rich microsites and survive longer than other seeds. These features are peculiar to myrmecochory, which may thus provide additional benefits not present in other dispersal modes.

Seed dispersal may also allow plants to colonize vacant habitats and even new geographic regions. Dispersal distances and deposition sites depend on the movement range of the disperser, and longer dispersal distances are sometimes accomplished through diplochory, the sequential dispersal by two or more different dispersal mechanisms. In fact, recent evidence suggests that the majority of seed dispersal events involves more than one dispersal phase.

== Types ==
Seed dispersal is sometimes split into autochory (when dispersal is attained using the plant's own means) and allochory (when obtained through external means).

=== Long distance ===
Long-distance seed dispersal (LDD) is a type of spatial dispersal that is currently defined by two forms, proportional and actual distance. A plant's fitness and survival may heavily depend on this method of seed dispersal depending on certain environmental factors. The first form of LDD, proportional distance, measures the percentage of seeds (1% out of total number of seeds produced) that travel the farthest distance out of a 99% probability distribution. The proportional definition of LDD is in actuality a descriptor for more extreme dispersal events. An example of LDD would be that of a plant developing a specific dispersal vector or morphology in order to allow for the dispersal of its seeds over a great distance. The actual or absolute method identifies LDD as a literal distance. It classifies 1 km as the threshold distance for seed dispersal. Here, threshold means the minimum distance a plant can disperse its seeds and have it still count as LDD. There is a second, unmeasurable, form of LDD besides proportional and actual. This is known as the non-standard form. Non-standard LDD is when seed dispersal occurs in an unusual and difficult-to-predict manner. An example would be a rare or unique incident in which a normally-lemur-dependent deciduous tree of Madagascar was to have seeds transported to the coastline of South Africa via attachment to a mermaid purse (egg case) laid by a shark or skate. A driving factor for the evolutionary significance of LDD is that it increases plant fitness by decreasing neighboring plant competition for offspring. However, it is still unclear today as to how specific traits, conditions and trade-offs (particularly within short seed dispersal) affect LDD evolution.

=== Autochory ===
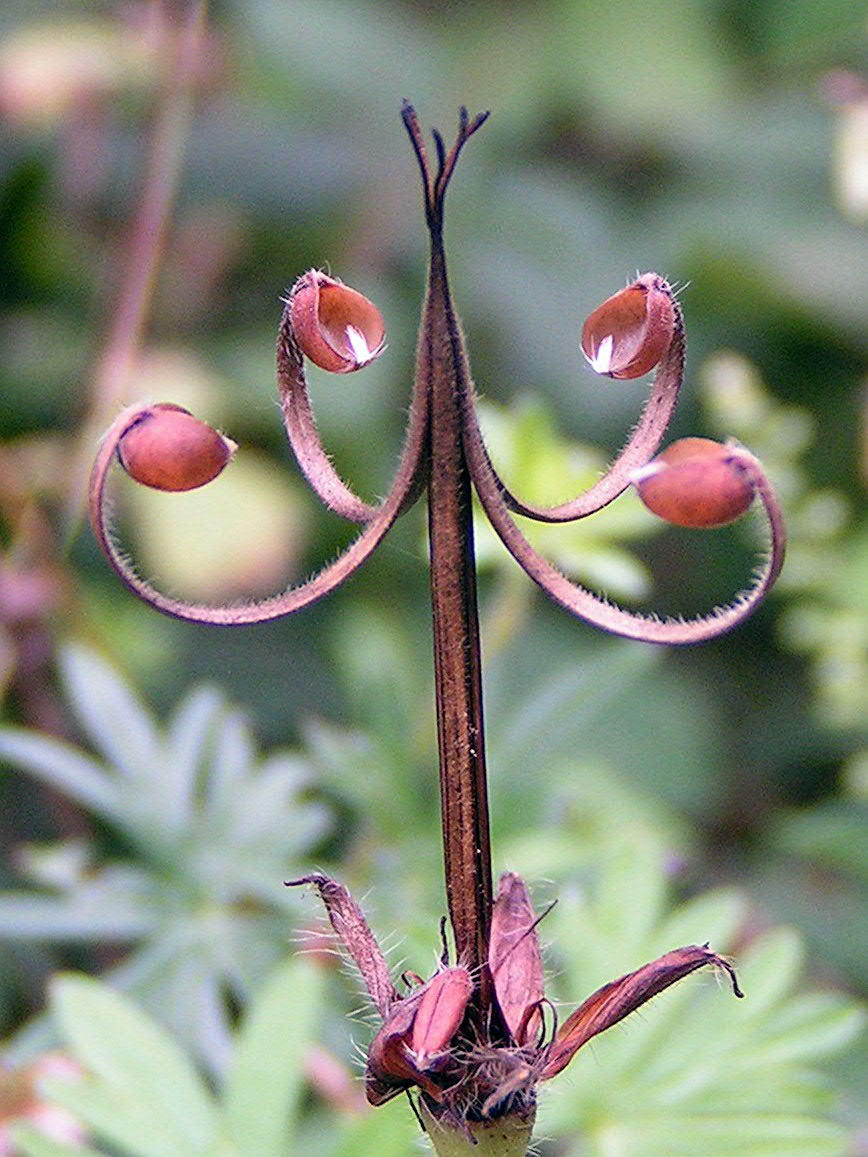
The "bill" and seed dispersal mechanism of Geranium pratense

Autochorous plants disperse their seed without any help from an external vector. This limits considerably the distance they can disperse their seed. Two other types of autochory not described in detail here are blastochory, where the stem of the plant crawls along the ground to deposit its seed far from the base of the plant; and herpochory, where the seed crawls by means of trichomes or hygroscopic appendages (awns) and changes in humidity.

==== Gravity ====
Barochory or the plant use of gravity for dispersal is a simple means of achieving seed dispersal. The effect of gravity on heavier fruits causes them to fall from the plant when ripe. Fruits exhibiting this type of dispersal include apples, coconuts and passionfruit and those with harder shells (which often roll away from the plant to gain more distance). Gravity dispersal also allows for later transmission by water or animal.

==== Ballistic dispersal ====
Ballochory is a type of dispersal where the seed is forcefully ejected by explosive dehiscence of the fruit. Often the force that generates the explosion results from turgor pressure within the fruit or due to internal hygroscopic tensions within the fruit. Some examples of plants which disperse their seeds autochorously include: Arceuthobium spp., Cardamine hirsuta, Ecballium elaterium, Euphorbia heterophylla, Geranium spp., Impatiens spp., Sucrea spp, Raddia spp. and others. An exceptional example of ballochory is Hura crepitans—this plant is commonly called the dynamite tree due to the sound of the fruit exploding. The explosions are powerful enough to throw the seed up to 100 meters.

Witch hazel uses ballistic dispersal without explosive mechanisms by simply squeezing the seeds out at approx. 45 km/h (28 mph).

=== Allochory ===
Allochory refers to any of many types of seed dispersal where a vector or secondary agent is used to disperse seeds. These vectors may include wind, water, animals or others.

==== Wind ====
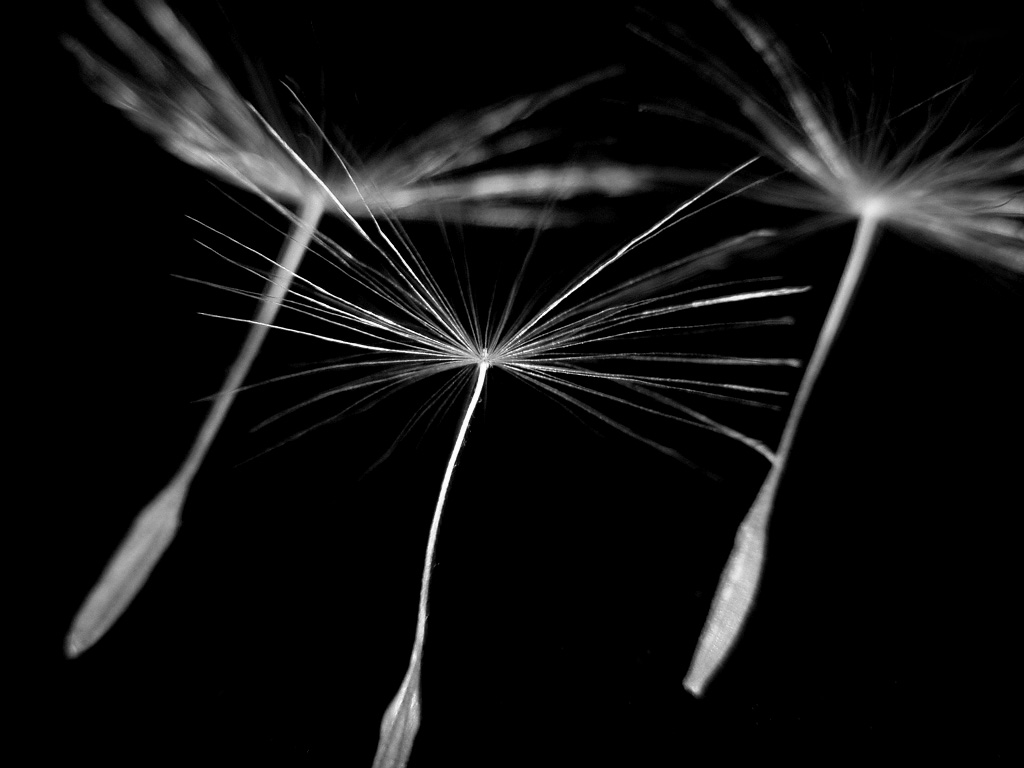
Wind dispersal of dandelion fruits

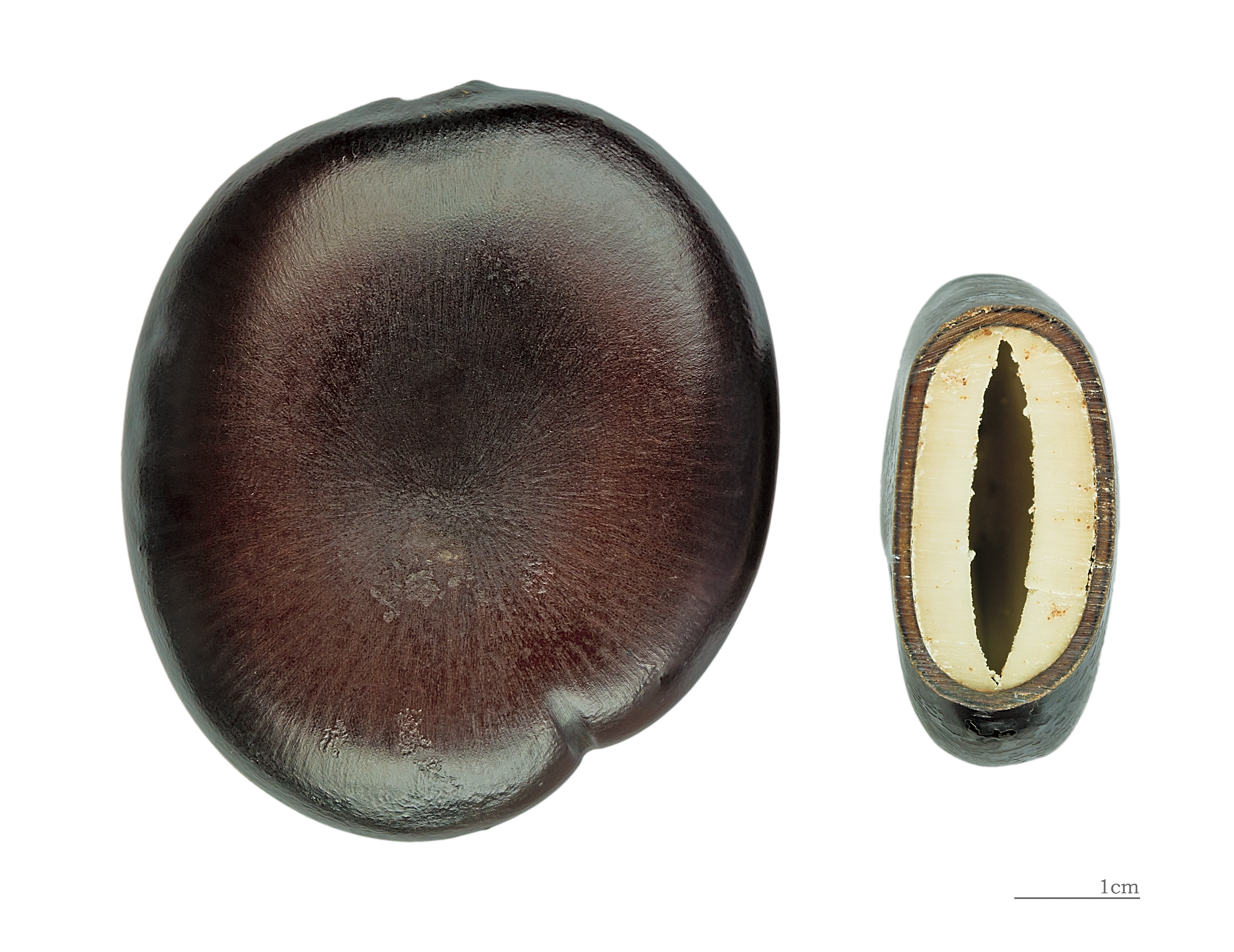
Entada phaseoloides – Hydrochory

Wind dispersal (anemochory) is one of the more primitive means of dispersal. Wind dispersal can take on one of two primary forms: seeds or fruits can float on the breeze or, alternatively, they can flutter to the ground. The classic examples of these dispersal mechanisms, in the temperate northern hemisphere, include dandelions, which have a feathery pappus attached to their fruits (achenes) and can be dispersed long distances, and maples, which have winged fruits (samaras) that flutter to the ground.

An important constraint on wind dispersal is the need for abundant seed production to maximize the likelihood of a seed landing in a site suitable for germination. Some wind-dispersed plants, such as the dandelion, can adjust their morphology in order to increase or decrease the rate of diaspore detachment. There are also strong evolutionary constraints on this dispersal mechanism. For instance, Cody and Overton (1996) found that species in the Asteraceae on islands tended to have reduced dispersal capabilities (i.e., larger seed mass and smaller pappus) relative to the same species on the mainland. Also, Helonias bullata, a species of perennial herb native to the United States, evolved to utilize wind dispersal as the primary seed dispersal mechanism; however, limited wind in its habitat prevents the seeds from successfully dispersing away from its parents, resulting in clusters of population. Reliance on wind dispersal is common among many weedy or ruderal species. Unusual mechanisms of wind dispersal include tumbleweeds, where the entire plant (except for the roots) is blown by the wind. Physalis fruits, when not fully ripe, may sometimes be dispersed by wind due to the space between the fruit and the covering calyx, which acts as an air bladder.

==== Water ====
Many aquatic and some terrestrial species use hydrochory, or seed dispersal through water. Seeds can travel for extremely long distances, depending on the specific mode of water dispersal; this especially applies to fruits which are waterproof and float on water.

The water lily is an example of such a plant. Water lilies' flowers make a fruit that floats in the water for a while and then drops down to the bottom to take root on the floor of the pond. The seeds of palm trees can also be dispersed by water. If they grow near oceans, the seeds can be transported by ocean currents over long distances, allowing the seeds to be dispersed as far as other continents.

Mangrove trees grow in tidal zones; when their seeds are ripe they fall from the tree and grow roots as soon as they touch any kind of soil. During low tide, they might fall in soil instead of water and start growing right where they fell. If the water level is high, however, they can be carried far away from where they fell. Mangrove trees often make little islands as dirt and detritus collect in their roots, making little bodies of land.

==== Animals: epi- and endozoochory ====
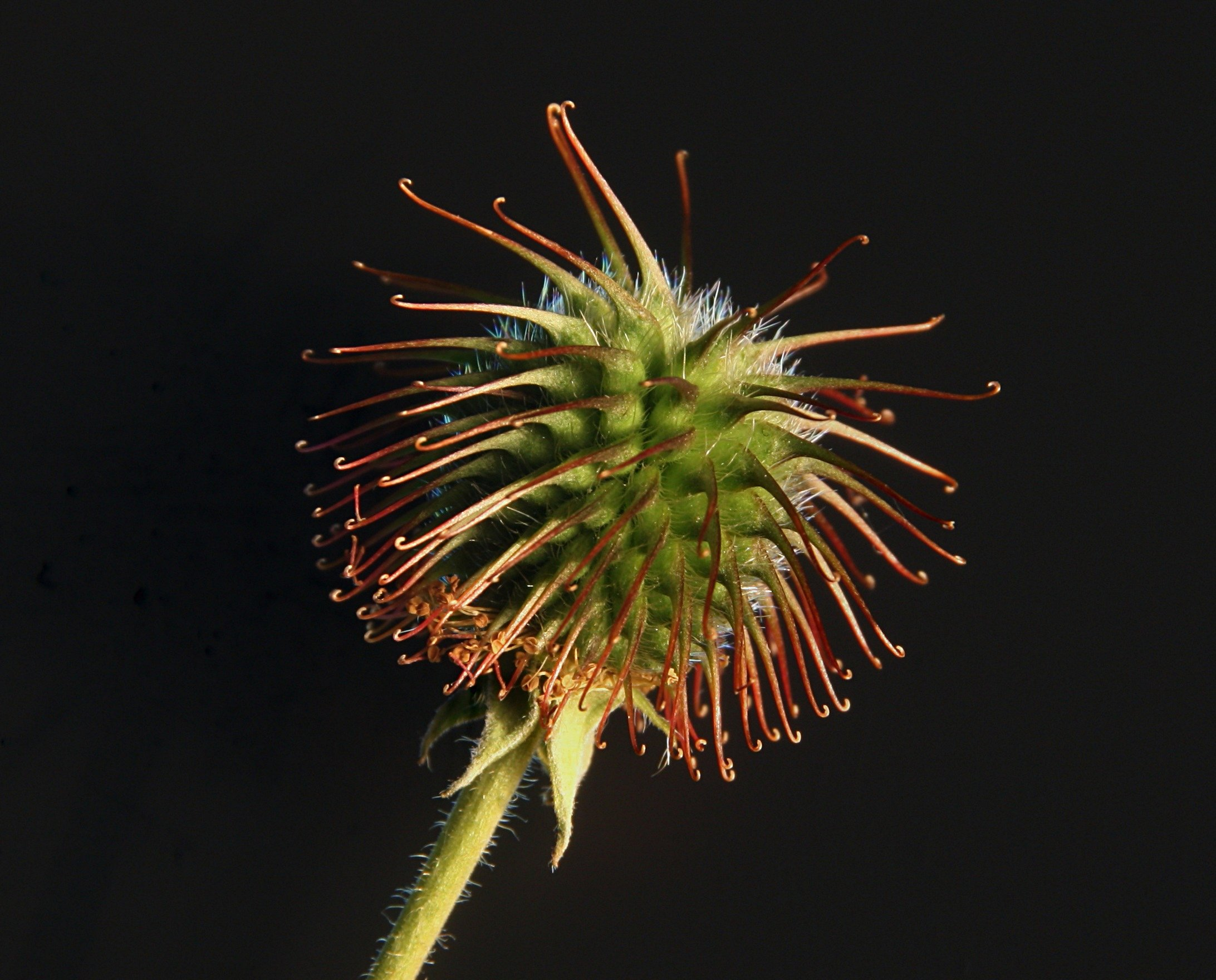
The small hooks on the surface of a Geum urbanum bur enable attachment of individual hooked fruits to animal fur for dispersion.

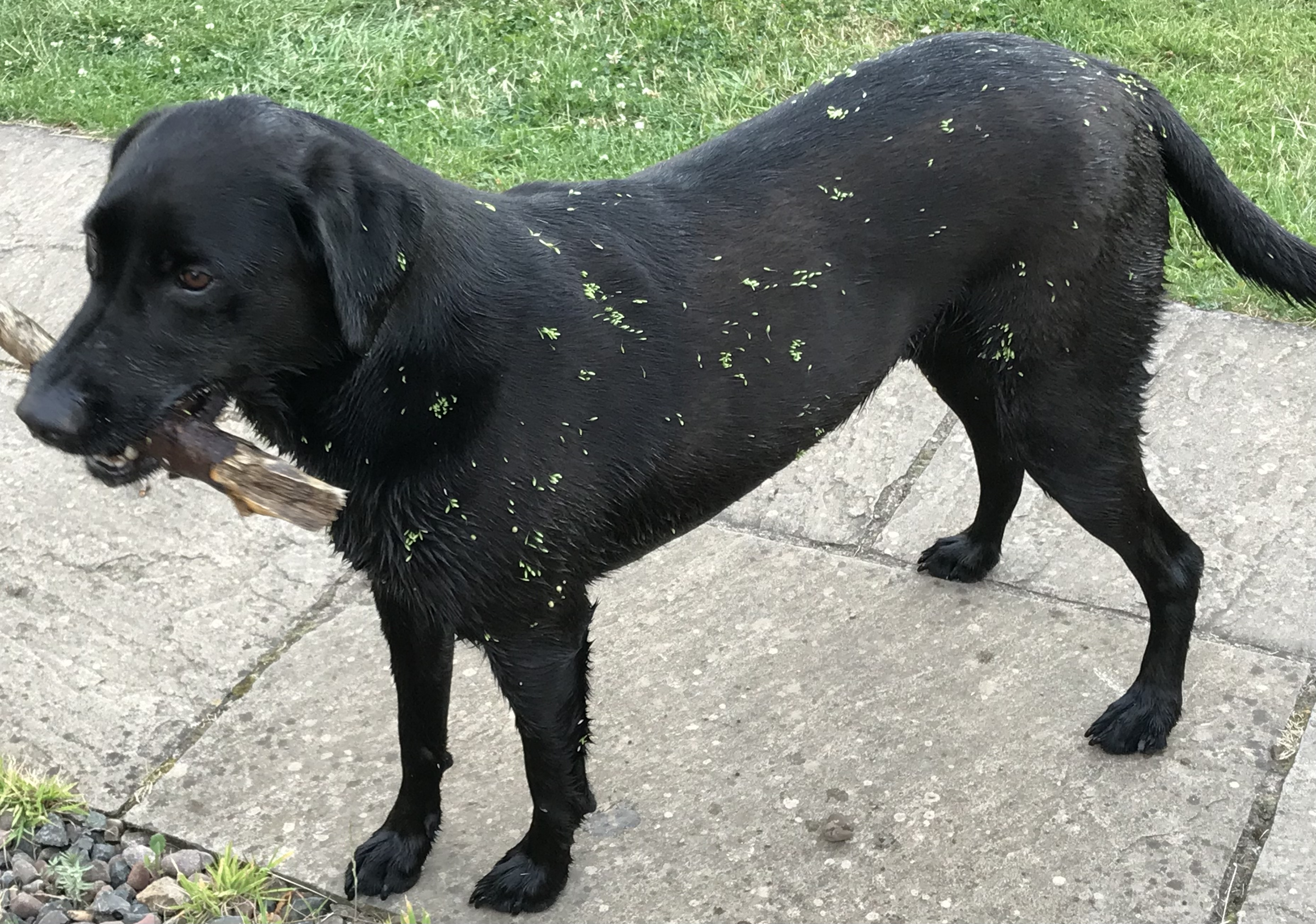
Example of epizoochory: Labrador Retriever with hooked fruits detached from Geum urbanum burs trapped in fur after running through undergrowth

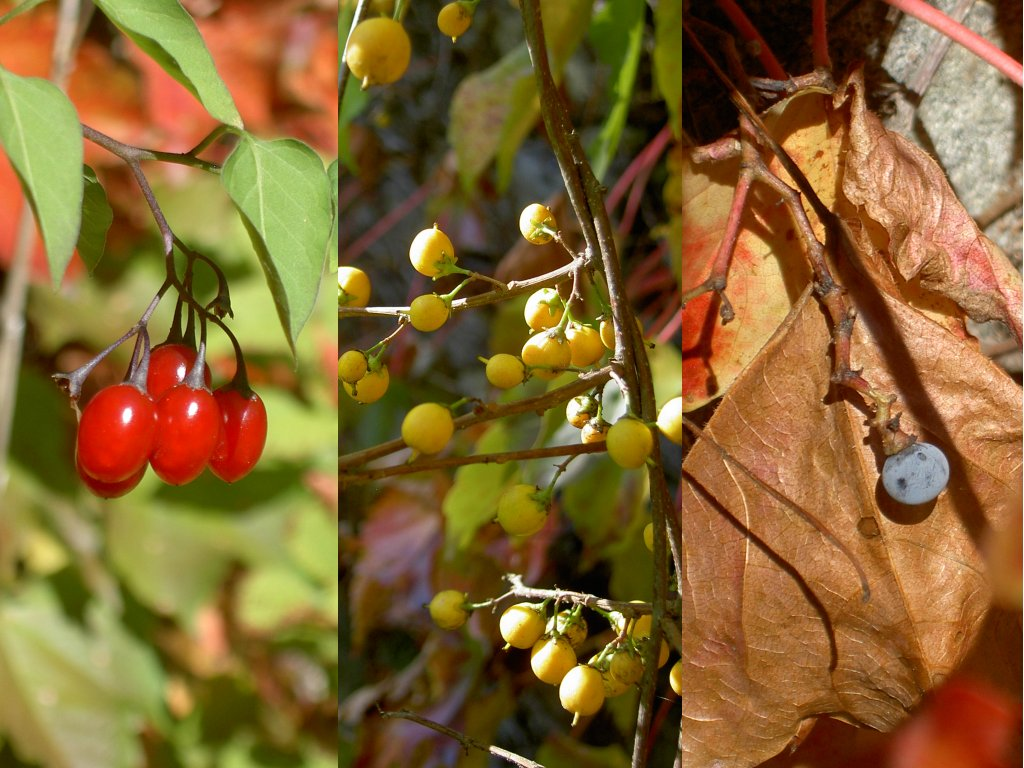
Colorful berries attract birds which eat the fruit and later disperse the seeds in their droppings (endozoochory).

Animals can disperse plant seeds in several ways, all named zoochory. Seeds can be transported on the outside of vertebrate animals (mostly mammals), a process known as epizoochory. Plant species transported externally by animals can have a variety of adaptations for dispersal, including adhesive mucus, and a variety of hooks, spines and barbs. A typical example of an epizoochorous plant is Trifolium angustifolium, a species of Old World clover which adheres to animal fur by means of stiff hairs covering the seed. Epizoochorous plants tend to be herbaceous plants, with many representative species in the families Apiaceae and Asteraceae. However, epizoochory is a relatively rare dispersal syndrome for plants as a whole; the percentage of plant species with seeds adapted for transport on the outside of animals is estimated to be below 5%. Nevertheless, epizoochorous transport can be highly effective if the seeds attach to animals that travel widely. This form of seed dispersal has been implicated in rapid plant migration and the spread of invasive species.

Seed dispersal via ingestion and defecation by vertebrate animals (mostly birds and mammals), or endozoochory, is the dispersal mechanism for most tree species. Endozoochory is generally a coevolved mutualistic relationship in which a plant surrounds seeds with an edible, nutritious fruit as a good food resource for animals that consume it. Such plants may advertise the presence of food resource by using colour. Birds and mammals are the most important seed dispersers, but a wide variety of other animals, including turtles, fish, and insects (e.g. tree wētā and scree wētā), can transport viable seeds. The exact percentage of tree species dispersed by endozoochory varies between habitats, but can range to over 90% in some tropical rainforests. Seed dispersal by animals in tropical rainforests has received much attention, and this interaction is considered an important force shaping the ecology and evolution of vertebrate and tree populations. In the tropics, large-animal seed dispersers (such as tapirs, chimpanzees, black-and-white colobus, toucans and hornbills) may disperse large seeds that have few other seed dispersal agents. The extinction of these large frugivores from poaching and habitat loss may have negative effects on the tree populations that depend on them for seed dispersal and reduce genetic diversity among trees. Seed dispersal through endozoochory can lead to quick spread of invasive species, such as in the case of prickly acacia in Australia. A variation of endozoochory is regurgitation of seeds rather than their passage in faeces after passing through the entire digestive tract.

Seed dispersal by ants (myrmecochory) is a dispersal mechanism of many shrubs of the southern hemisphere or understorey herbs of the northern hemisphere. Seeds of myrmecochorous plants have a lipid-rich attachment called the elaiosome, which attracts ants. Ants carry such seeds into their colonies, feed the elaiosome to their larvae and discard the otherwise intact seed in an underground chamber. Myrmecochory is thus a coevolved mutualistic relationship between plants and seed-disperser ants. Myrmecochory has independently evolved at least 100 times in flowering plants and is estimated to be present in at least 11 000 species, but likely up to 23 000 (which is 9% of all species of flowering plants). Myrmecochorous plants are most frequent in the fynbos vegetation of the Cape Floristic Region of South Africa, the kwongan vegetation and other dry habitat types of Australia, dry forests and grasslands of the Mediterranean region and northern temperate forests of western Eurasia and eastern North America, where up to 30–40% of understorey herbs are myrmecochorous. Seed dispersal by ants is a mutualistic relationship and benefits both the ant and the plant.

Seed dispersal by bees (melittochory) is an unusual dispersal mechanism for a small number of tropical plants. As of 2023 it has only been documented in five plant species including Corymbia torelliana, Coussapoa asperifolia subsp. magnifolia, Zygia racemosa, Vanilla odorata, and Vanilla planifolia. The first three are tropical trees and the last two are tropical vines.

Seed predators, which include many rodents (such as squirrels) and some birds (such as jays) may also disperse seeds by hoarding the seeds in hidden caches. The seeds in caches are usually well-protected from other seed predators and if left uneaten will grow into new plants. Rodents may also disperse seeds when the presence of secondary metabolites in ripe fruits causes them to spit out certain seeds rather than consuming them. Finally, seeds may be secondarily dispersed from seeds deposited by primary animal dispersers, a process known as diplochory. For example, dung beetles are known to disperse seeds from clumps of feces in the process of collecting dung to feed their larvae.

Other types of zoochory are chiropterochory (by bats), malacochory (by molluscs, mainly terrestrial snails), ornithochory (by birds) and saurochory (by non-bird sauropsids). Zoochory can occur in more than one phase, for example through diploendozoochory, where a primary disperser (an animal that ate a seed) along with the seeds it is carrying is eaten by a predator that then carries the seed further before depositing it.

==== Humans ====
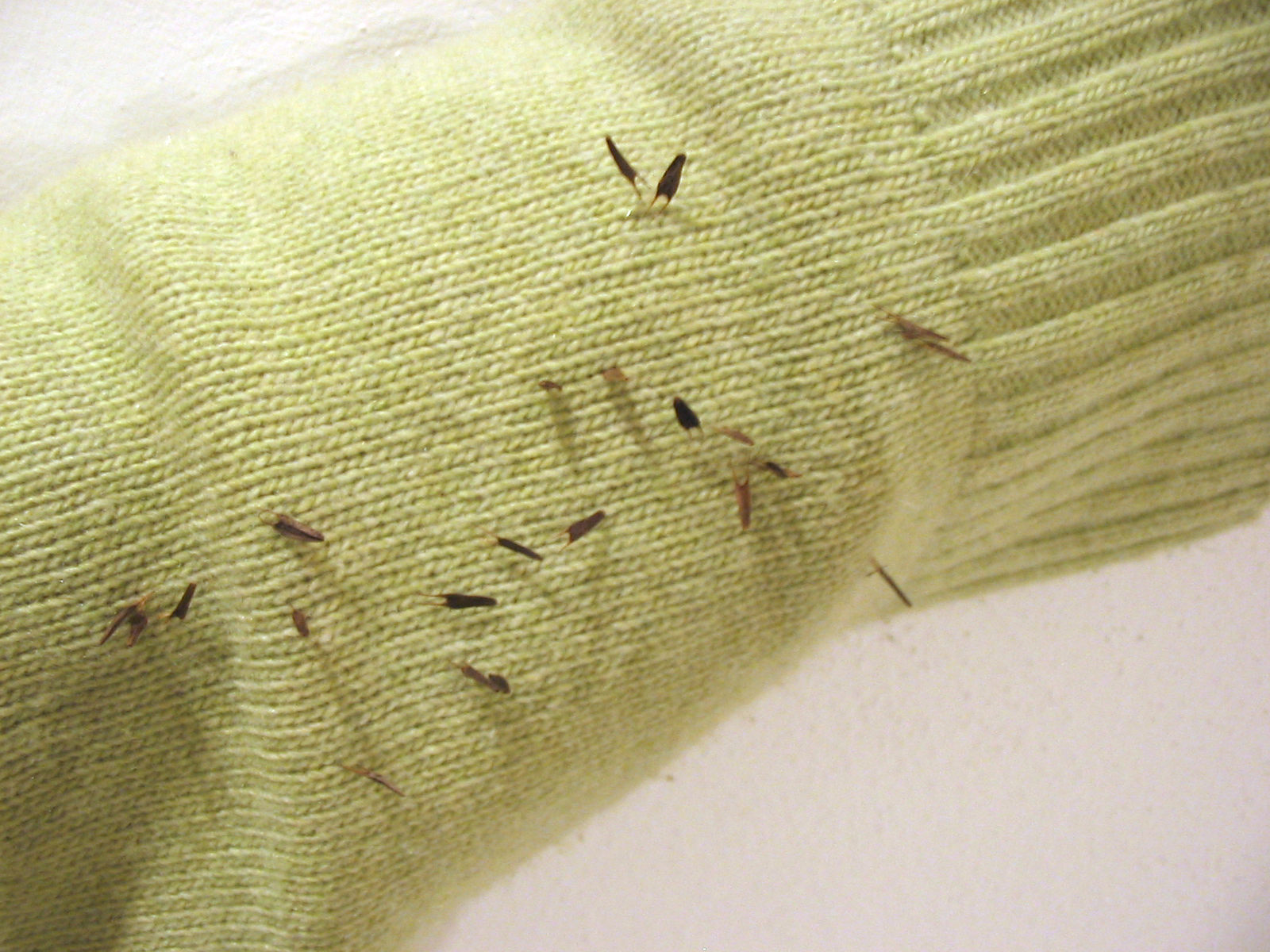
Epizoochory in Bidens tripartita (Asteraceae); the hooked achenes of the plant readily attach to clothing, such as this shirt sleeve.

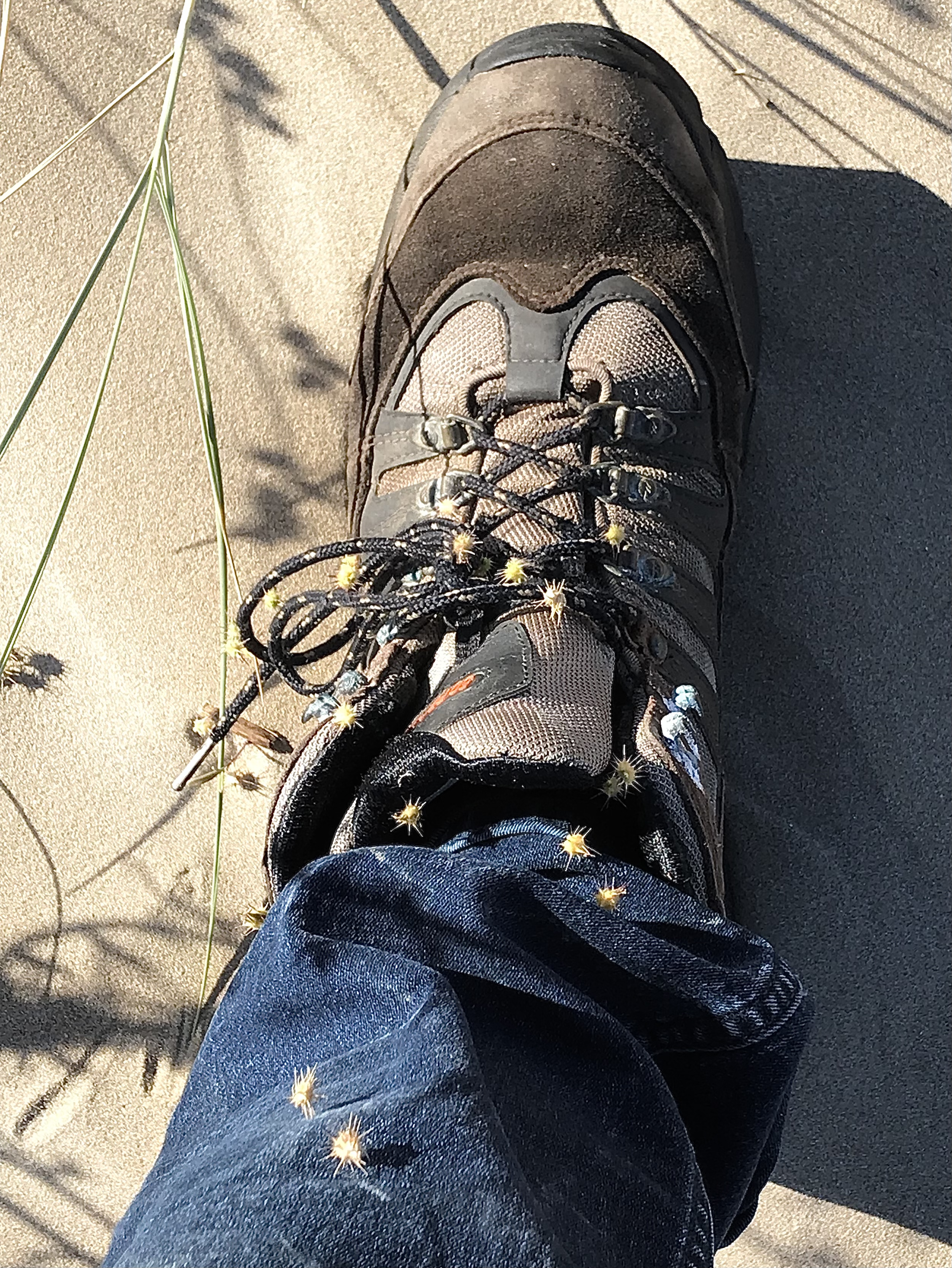
Epizoochory in the grass Cenchrus spinifex: burs on clothing after walk on beach

Seed dispersal by a car

Dispersal by humans (anthropochory) used to be seen as a form of dispersal by animals. Its most widespread and intense cases account for the planting of much of the land area on the planet, through agriculture. In this case, human societies form a long-term relationship with plant species, and create conditions for their growth.

Recent research points out that human dispersers differ from animal dispersers by having a much higher mobility, based on the technical means of human transport. On the one hand, dispersal by humans also acts on smaller, regional scales and drives the dynamics of existing biological populations. On the other hand, dispersal by humans may act on large geographical scales and lead to the spread of invasive species.

Humans may disperse seeds by many various means and some surprisingly high distances have been repeatedly measured. Examples are: dispersal on human clothes (up to 250 m), on shoes (up to 5 km), or by cars (regularly ~ 250 m, single cases > 100 km). Humans can unintentionally transport seeds by car, which can carry the seeds much greater distances than other conventional methods of dispersal. Soil on cars can contain viable seeds. A study by Dunmail J. Hodkinson and Ken Thompson found that the most common seeds carried by vehicle were broadleaf plantain (Plantago major), Annual meadow grass (Poa annua), rough meadow grass (Poa trivialis), stinging nettle (Urtica dioica) and wild chamomile (Matricaria discoidea).

Deliberate seed dispersal also occurs as seed bombing. This has risks, as it may introduce genetically unsuitable plants to new environments.

== Consequences ==
Seed dispersal has many consequences for the ecology and evolution of plants. Dispersal is necessary for species migrations, and in recent times dispersal ability is an important factor in whether or not a species transported to a new habitat by humans will become an invasive species. Dispersal is also predicted to play a major role in the origin and maintenance of species diversity. For example, myrmecochory increased the rate of diversification more than twofold in plant groups in which it has evolved, because myrmecochorous lineages contain more than twice as many species as their non-myrmecochorous sister groups. Dispersal of seeds away from the parent organism has a central role in two major theories for how biodiversity is maintained in natural ecosystems, the Janzen-Connell hypothesis and recruitment limitation. Seed dispersal is essential in allowing forest migration of flowering plants. It can be influenced by the production of different fruit morphs in plants, a phenomenon known as heterocarpy. These fruit morphs are different in size and shape and have different dispersal ranges, which allows seeds to be dispersed over varying distances and adapt to different environments. The distances of the dispersal also affect the kernel of the seed. The lowest distances of seed dispersal were found in wetlands, whereas the longest were in dry landscapes.

In addition, the speed and direction of wind are highly influential in the dispersal process and in turn the deposition patterns of floating seeds in stagnant water bodies. The transportation of seeds is led by the wind direction. This affects colonization when it is situated on the banks of a river, or to wetlands adjacent to streams relative to the given wind directions. The wind dispersal process can also affect connections between water bodies. Essentially, wind plays a larger role in the dispersal of waterborne seeds in a short period of time, days and seasons, but the ecological process allows the phenomenon to become balanced throughout a time period of several years. The time period over which the dispersal occurs is essential when considering the consequences of wind on the ecological process.

== See also ==
- Biological dispersal
- Biantitropical distribution
- Disturbance (ecology)
- Dormancy – "dispersal in time"
- Gene flow
- Habitat fragmentation
- Landscape ecology
- Metapopulation
- Oceanic dispersal
- Population ecology
- Seed dispersal syndrome
- Evolutionary anachronism
