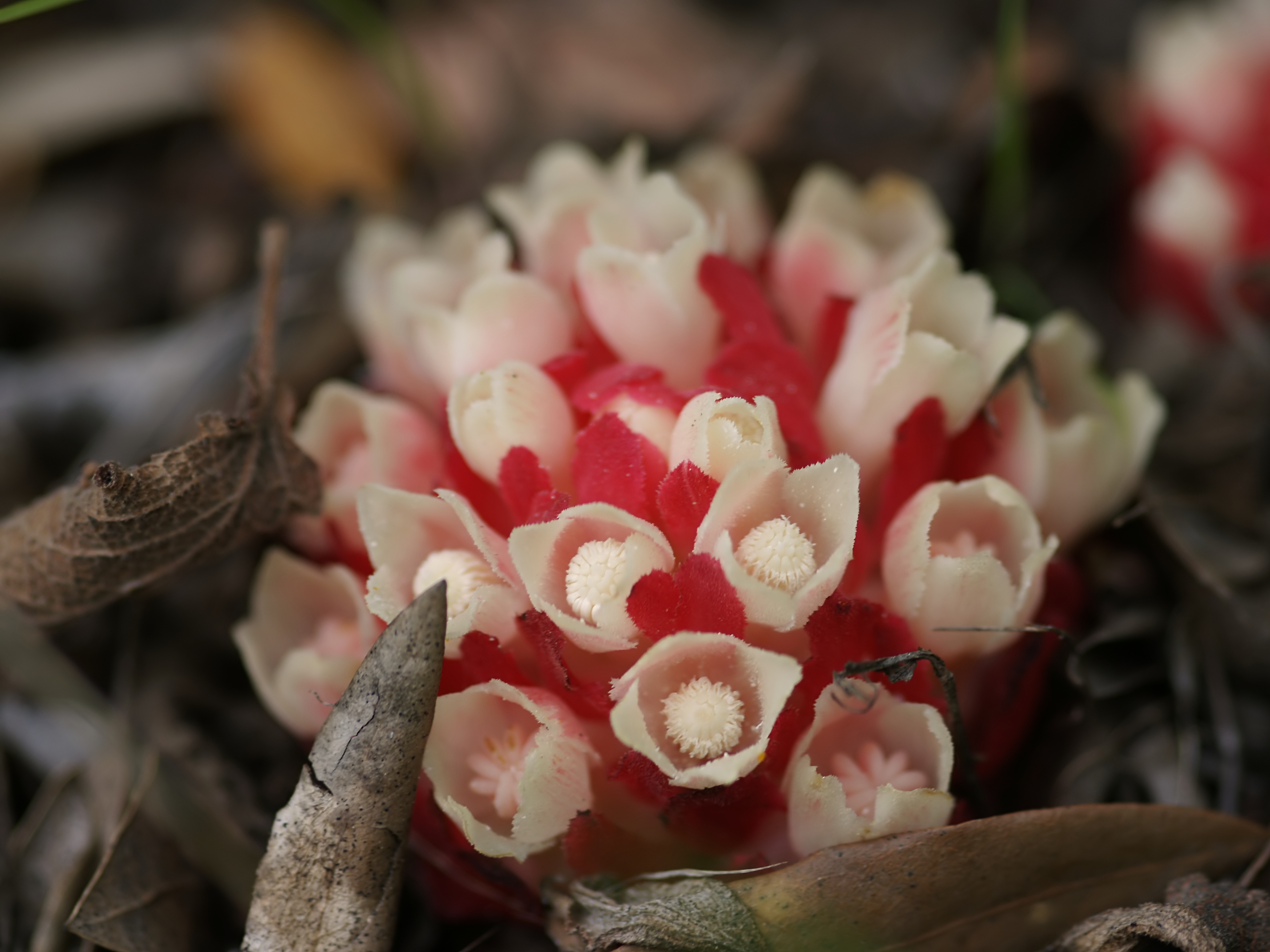
- Cytinus ruber from Sardinia

Scientific classification
- Kingdom: Plantae
- Clade: Embryophytes
- Clade: Tracheophytes
- Clade: Spermatophytes
- Clade: Angiosperms
- Clade: Eudicots
- Clade: Rosids
- Order: Malvales
- Family: Cytinaceae
- Genus: Cytinus; L.

Species
- See text

= Cytinus =

Genus of plants

Cytinus is a genus of parasitic flowering plants. Species in this genus do not produce chlorophyll, but rely fully on its host plant. Cytinus usually parasitizes Cistus and Halimium, two genera of plants in the family Cistaceae. It has also been found on Ptilostemon chamaepeuce.

Several species are found in the Mediterranean Region, South Africa, with a possibly undescribed species from Madagascar.

== Biology ==
C. capensis and C. sanguineus are dioecious, while C. hypocistis is monoecious.

C. hypocistis has been shown to infect mainly Halimium halimifolium and Cistus monspeliensis in Portugal.

== Systematics ==
The genus Cytinus was previously included in the parasitic family Rafflesiaceae, but is now put into the family Cytinaceae (order Malvales), together with the genus Bdallophytum with four species.

== Uses ==
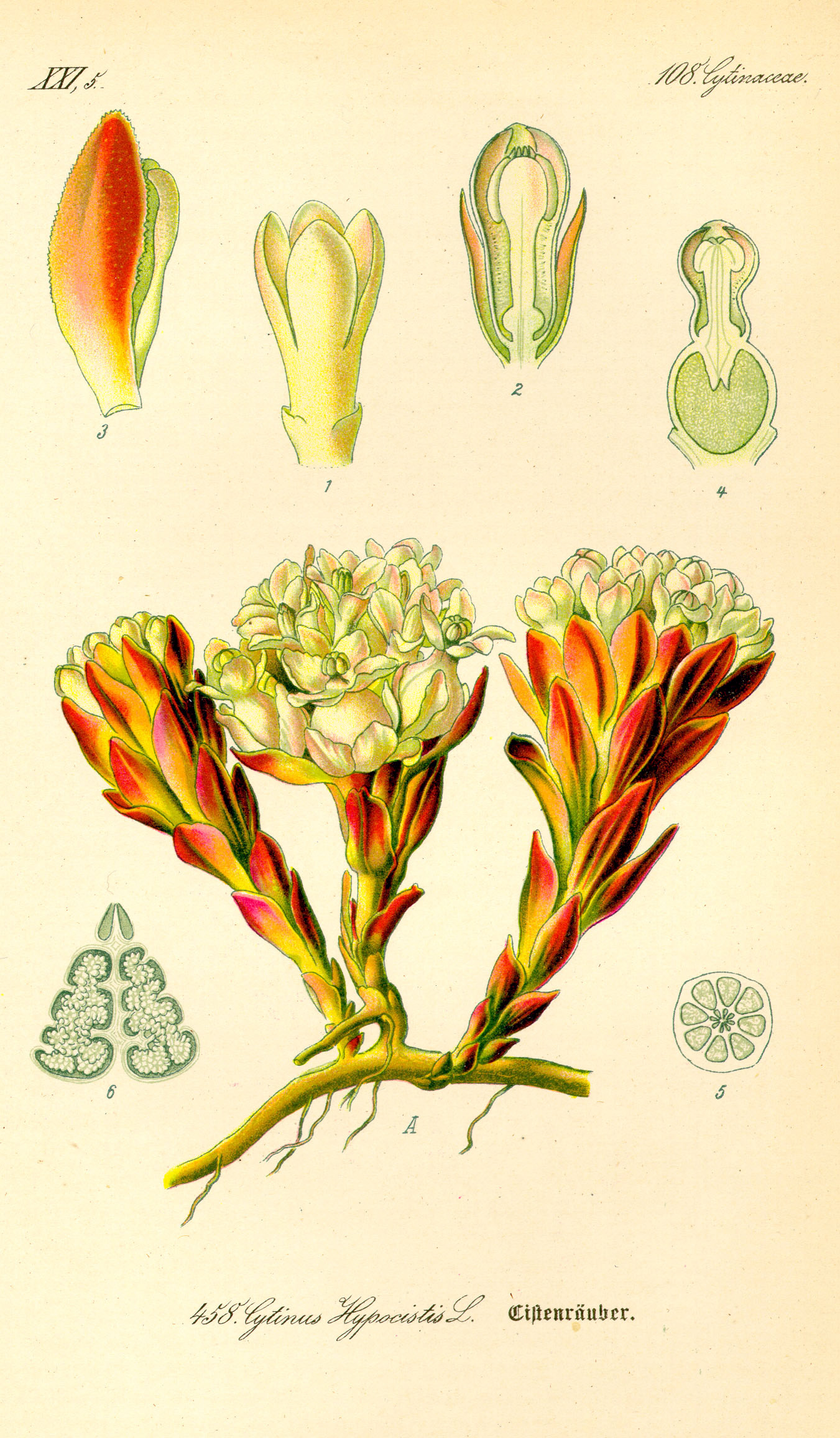
The flower of C. hypocistis

The young C. hypocistis is cooked as an asparagus substitute and an extract has been used in herbal medicine for dysentery, throat tumors and as an astringent. C. ruber is also edible and was used in folk medicine as an emmenagogue.

== Species ==
Image	Scientific name	Distribution
	Cytinus baronii Baker f.	Madagascar.
	Cytinus capensis Marloth	South Africa
	Cytinus glandulosus Jum.	Madagascar.
	Cytinus hypocistis (L.) L.	Mediterranean from Morocco to southern France and Turkey
	Cytinus malagasicus Jum. & H.Perrier	Madagascar.
	Cytinus ruber (Fourr.) Fritsch	Mediterranean
	Cytinus sanguineus (Thunb.) Fourc.	South Africa
	Cytinus visseri Burgoyne	South Africa
