= Diplochory =

Diplochory, also known as "secondary dispersal", "indirect dispersal" or "two-phase dispersal", is a seed dispersal mechanism in which a plant's seed is moved sequentially by more than one dispersal mechanism or vector. The significance of the multiple dispersal steps on the plant fitness and population dynamics depends on the type of dispersers involved. In many cases, secondary seed dispersal by (typically granivorous) invertebrates or rodents moves seeds over a relatively short distance and a large proportion of the seeds may be lost to seed predation within this step. Longer dispersal distances and potentially larger ecological consequences follow from sequential endochory by two different animals, i.e. diploendozoochory: a primary disperser that initially consumes the seed, and a secondary, carnivorous animal that kills and eats the primary consumer along with the seeds in the prey's digestive tract, and then transports the seed further in its own digestive tract.

More than one dispersal vector (abiotic or biotic) is thought to be involved in the majority of seed dispersal events (on average 2.15 dispersal vectors in Dutch ecosystems). Seeds may be transported in turn by various animal or abiotic mechanisms such as wind or water.

== Types of diplochory ==
Six main types of diplochory have been identified based on the dispersal mechanisms involved:

1. Wind dispersal (anemochory) & scatter-hoarding (caching) by animals
2. Ballistic dispersal and myrmechory (dispersal by ants)
3. Endozoochory and dung beetles
4. Endozoochory and synzoochory
5. Endozoochory and myrmechory
6. Endozoochory and endozoochory
7. Synzoochory and synzoochory

Diplochory can be beneficial to plants in several ways. When the final phase involves a scatter-hoarder, plant seeds may experience lower predation risk. The caching of seeds by animals such as rodents or birds protects those seeds from being eaten by other seed predators, and because seed hoarders do not recover all the seeds they cached, it may prevent those seeds from being eaten altogether. Ants and dung beetles may also deposit seeds in highly nutritious and fertile habitats that are very favorable for plant growth.

=== Diploendozoochory ===
Diploendozoochory is a special form of diplochory in which all stages of the seed dispersal process involve endozoochory by animals. For example, many animals that feed on fruits or seeds are important prey species for a multitude of predators. Where they fall prey while carrying seeds in their digestive system, predators may act as secondary seed dispersers. This kind of predator-assisted seed dispersal was first described by Charles Darwin in 1859, and sporadic observations have since been recorded.

The phenomenon has been studied in most detail in an island system with lizards and raptors that prey on them. In the Canary Islands, frugivorous Atlantic lizards (Gallotia atlantica) consume Lycium intricatum fruit, and thus seeds from the fruit are found in their feces. The lizards are eaten by southern grey shrikes (Lanius meridionalis), and the shrike feces contained seeds from the fruit consumed by the lizards along with lizard remains. On these same islands, common kestrels (Falco tinnunculus) and invasive domestic cats (Felis catus) may also consume these lizards and dispersing the seeds from the lizards' guts. These lizards also consume other plant species whose seeds may be dispersed by the lizards' predators, such as Rubia fruticosa, Plocama pendula, and Asparagus nesiotes. Another example of diploendozoochory is that cougars (Puma concolor) eat eared doves (Zenaida auriculata), and as a result disperse seeds from lamb's-quarters (Chenopodium album), panic grass (Panicum bergii), and sorghum (Sorghum bicolor).

Secondary seed dispersal by predators can influence the dispersal distance, habitat in which the seed is deposited, or seed germination potential, that cause seed dispersal outcomes that differ from those of the plant's primary dispersers. While the second phase of diplochory often involves very small-scale movement of the seeds, diploendozoochory can lead to much increased dispersal distance. This is the case especially when the secondary disperser has a larger home range size, is more mobile, or more generalistic in its habitat use than the primary disperser. Because carnivores tend to range over large areas, they can thus help plants colonize new suitable habitats where the possible range changes due to climate change, or reach remote areas such as islands.

Alternative means of dispersal may affect ecological processes such as colonization of disturbed habitats, maintaining gene flow between sites in fragmented habitats, or facilitating long-distance dispersal. Carnivore involvement may also change the predicted patterns of the spread of invasive species, shifting ranges of plant species along climatic gradients, or the recovery of disturbed habitats. In habitats increasingly changed by humans, the presence and actions of carnivores may become increasingly important. It has also been suggested that plants may have evolved adaptations to benefit from such multi-phase dispersal, making this a mutualistic process. For example, some evidence suggests that island populations have more thick-coated seeds relative to mainland, which may be an adaptation by the plants to tolerate a longer (or multi-phase) digestion as the seeds are transported long distances. However, as the phenomenon has rarely been studied systematically, the prevalence of this seed dispersal mechanism and its importance for plant dispersal is not well understood.
