= Microsite (ecology) =

A microsite is a term used in ecology to describe a pocket within an environment with unique features, conditions or characteristics. Classifying different microsites may depend on temperature, humidity, sunlight, nutrient availability, soil physical characteristics, vegetation cover, etc. Being a sub environment within an environment, we will examine the qualities that differentiate a microsite from another within an environment in this piece.

== Microsite features ==
Microsites being a subset of the environment can be identified with its own:

=== Temperature ===
It refers to the temperature of the surrounding environment measured in degree Fahrenheit. The temperature of one microsite may not necessarily be the same with another one even if they are closely related in terms of location.

=== Humidity ===
It refers to the relative amount of moisture that could be held in the air. The more saturated the air is with water vapor in a microsite the more relative it is in humidity.

=== Sunlight ===
Plants uses energy from the sunlight to carry on photosynthesis. The possibility of sunlight to reach a microsite is another distinguishing characteristic which creates differences between microsites. There are some areas that the sunlight doesn’t reach which creates a different environmental condition than those that the sun reaches thus making some plants to have more fitness than others.

=== Availability of nutrients ===
Some microsites are rich in nutrients while some are not. This is a great difference because seeds germinate more in microsites that have more nutrients it needs than those that lack them. This is because plants and other autotrophs get nutrients (nitrogen, phosphorus, potassium, calcium, magnesium and Sulphur) they need from soil and water available in their microsite.

=== Soil physical characteristics ===
Plants obtain hydrogen from water found in the soil. Animals are influence by the soil physical characteristics for example where a fish will survive is not the same like that of a camel or goat. All this features help differentiate one microsite from another and explains the existence of organisms in one and not in the other.

=== Vegetation cover ===
This refers to collections of plants species over a land surface. A microsite in the Savana is different from that in the Sahara because of their vegetation cover. This explains the differences existing between the type of organisms that live in both areas.

== Microsite influence over habitat selection ==
With the many microsites that exist in an environment, organisms usually base their selection of habit on the features of the microsite they come across. Being able to choose the best microsite will positively influence the organism's survival, growth and reproduction. There choice of a good microsite has a direct relation to the future generation of the organisms.

== Limitation of microsites ==
Not all microsites have the necessary ingredients needed by plants and animals to survive and grow. While some may have, some condition may arise to render those ingredients not available again in the environment such as pollution or invasive species. In the case of seedling; air, light, soil, humus are all needed by seedling to grow and survive. The lack of these elements will cause a growth limitation factor in the said microsite and also survival issues. Same applies to animals but however in animals they can immigrate to other areas that favors their growth and survival while those who can not will be limited in fitness.
