= Myrmecochory =

Seed dispersal by ants

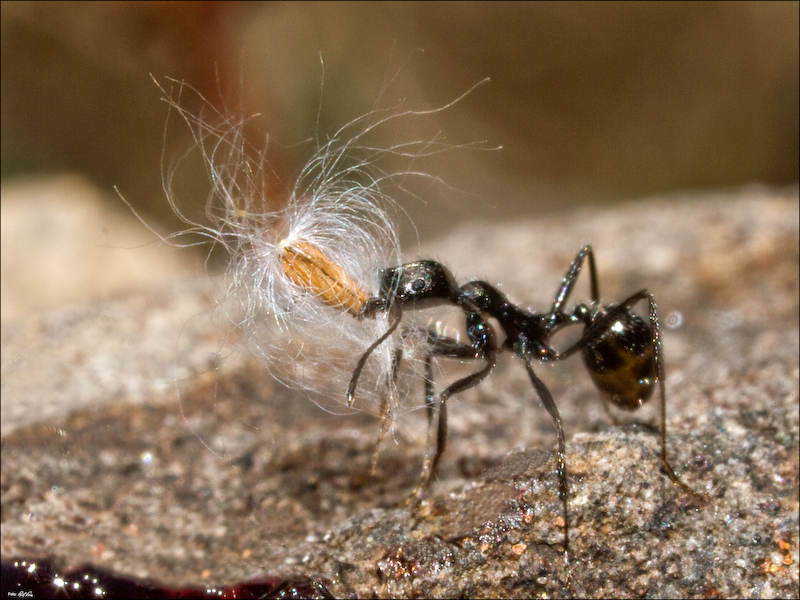
An ant carrying a seed

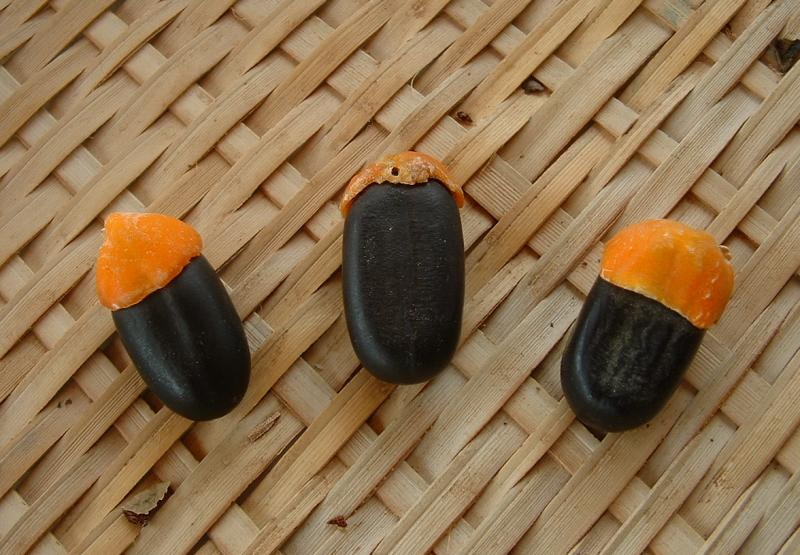
Afzelia africana seeds bearing elaiosomes

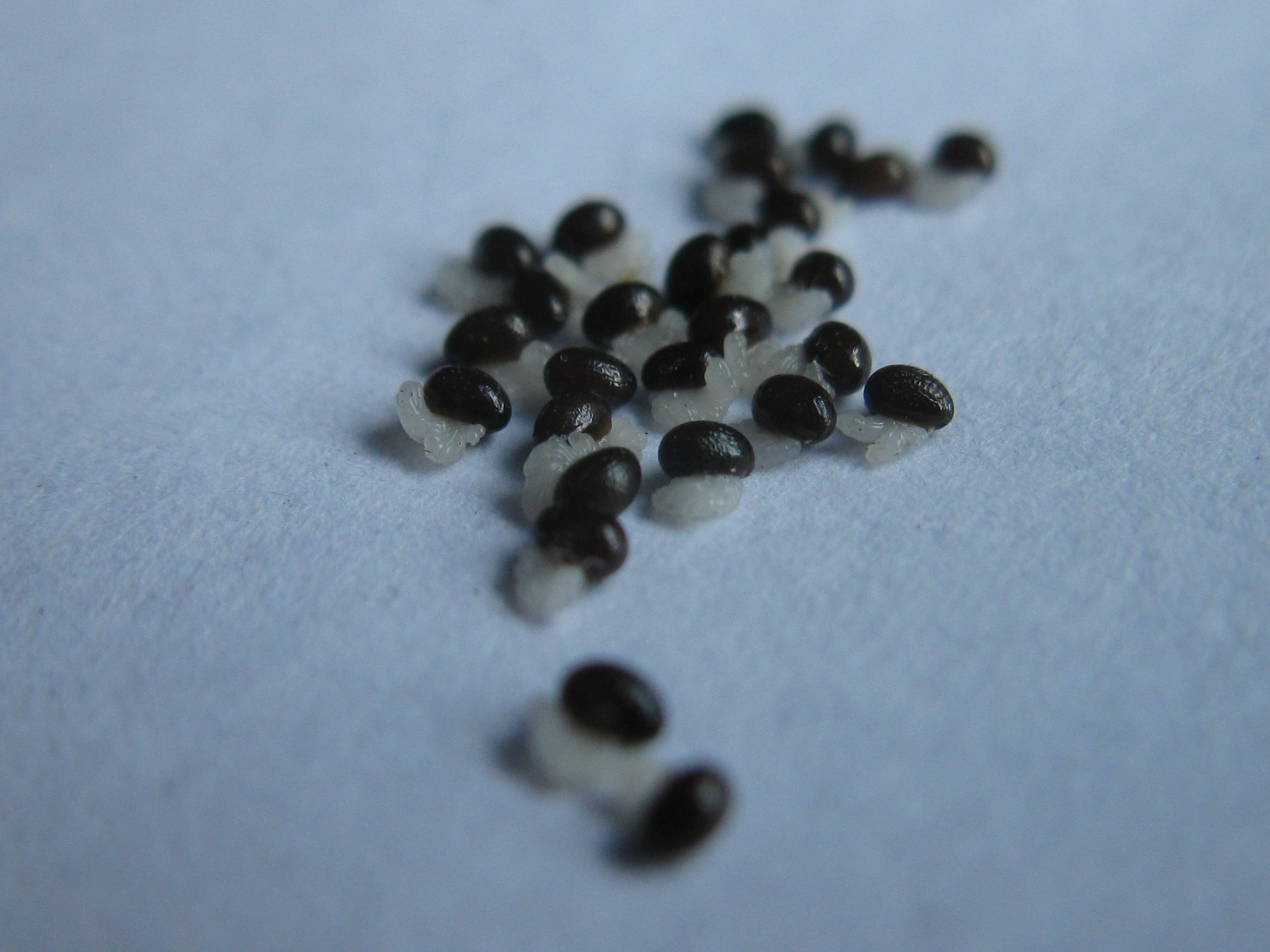
Chelidonium majus diaspores consisting of hard-coated seeds and attached elaiosomes

Myrmecochory (/mɜːrmɪˈkɒkɔːri/ (sometimes myrmechory); from Ancient Greek: μύρμηξ, romanized: mýrmēks ("ant") and χορεία khoreíā ("circular dance") is seed dispersal by ants, an ecologically significant ant–plant interaction with worldwide distribution. Most myrmecochorous plants produce seeds with elaiosomes, a term encompassing various external appendages or "food bodies" rich in lipids, amino acids, or other nutrients that are attractive to ants. The seed with its attached elaiosome is collectively known as a diaspore. Seed dispersal by ants is typically accomplished when foraging workers carry diaspores back to the ant colony, after which the elaiosome is removed or fed directly to ant larvae. Once the elaiosome is consumed, the seed is usually discarded in an underground midden or ejected from the nest. Although diaspores are seldom distributed far from the parent plant, myrmecochores also benefit from this predominantly mutualistic interaction through dispersal to favourable locations for germination, as well as escape from seed predation.

== Distribution and diversity ==
Myrmecochory is exhibited by more than 3,000 plant species worldwide and is present in every major biome on all continents except Antarctica. Seed dispersal by ants is particularly common in the dry heath and sclerophyll woodlands of Australia (1,500 species) and the South African fynbos (1,000 species). Both regions have a Mediterranean climate and largely infertile soils (characterized by low phosphorus availability), two factors that are often cited to explain the distribution of myrmecochory. Myrmecochory is also present in mesic forests in temperate regions of the Northern Hemisphere (i.e. in Europe and in eastern North America), as well as in tropical forests and dry deserts, though to a lesser degree. Estimates for the true biodiversity of myrmecochorous plants range from 11,000 to as high as 23,000 species worldwide, or about 5% of all flowering plant species.

== Evolutionary history ==
Myrmecochory has evolved independently many times in a large number of plant families. A recent phylogenetic study identified more than 100 separate origins of myrmecochory in 55 families of flowering plants. With many independent evolutionary origins, elaiosomes have evolved from a wide variety of parent tissues. Strong selective pressure or the relative ease with which elaiosomes can develop from parent tissues may explain the multiple origins of myrmecochory. These findings identify myrmecochory as a prime example of convergent evolution. In addition, phylogenetic comparison of myrmecochorous plant groups reveals that more than half of the lineages in which myrmecochory evolved are more species-rich than their nonmyrmecochorous sister groups. Not only is myrmecochory a convergent trait, but it also promotes diversification in multiple flowering plant lineages.

== Ecology ==
Myrmecochory is usually classified as a mutualism, but this is contingent on the degree to which participating species benefit from the interaction. Several different factors likely combine to create mutualistic conditions. Myrmecochorous plants may derive benefit from increased dispersal distance, directed dispersal to nutrient-enriched or protected microsites, and/or seed predator avoidance. Costs incurred by myrmecochorous plants include the energy required to provision diaspores, particularly when a disproportionate investment is made of growth-limiting mineral nutrients. For instance, some Australian Acacia species invest a significant portion of their yearly phosphorus uptake in producing diaspores. Diaspores must also be protected from outright predation by ants. This is typically accomplished by the production of a hard, smooth testa, or seed coat.

Few studies have examined the costs and benefits to ants participating in myrmecochory. Much remains to be understood about the selective advantages conferred upon myrmecochorous ants.

No single hypothesis explains the evolution and persistence of myrmecochory. Instead, a combination of beneficial effects working at different spatiotemporal scales likely contribute to the viability of this predominantly mutualistic interaction. Three commonly cited advantages to myrmecochorous plants are increased dispersal distance, directed dispersal, and seed predator avoidance.

=== Dispersal distance ===
Increasing dispersal distance from the parent plant is likely to reduce seed mortality resulting from density-dependent effects. Ants can transport seeds as far as 180 m but the average is less than 2 m, and values between 0.5 and 1.5 m are most common. Perhaps due to the relatively limited distance that ants disperse seeds, many myrmecochores exhibit diplochory, a two-staged dispersal mechanism, often with ballistic projection as the initial mechanism, that can increase dispersal distance by as much as 50%. In some cases, ballistic dispersal distance regularly exceeds that of transport by ants. The dispersal distance achieved through myrmecochory is likely to provide an advantage proportionate to the spatial scale of density-dependent effects acting on individual plants. As such, the relatively modest distances ants transport seeds are likely to be more advantageous for myrmecochorous shrubs, forbs, and other plants of small stature.

=== Directed dispersal ===
Myrmecochorous plants may benefit when ants disperse seeds to nutrient-rich or protected microsites that enhance germination and establishment of seedlings. Ants disperse seeds in fairly predictable ways, either by disposing of them in underground middens or by ejecting them from the nest. These patterns of ant dispersal are predictable enough to permit plants to manipulate animal behaviour and influence seed fate, effectively directing the dispersal of seeds to desirable sites. For example, myrmecochores can influence seed fate by producing rounder, smoother diaspores that inhibit ants from redispersing seeds after elaiosome removal. This increases the likelihood that seeds will remain underground instead of being ejected from the nest.

Nest chemistry is ideally suited for seed germination given that ant colonies are typically enriched with plant nutrients such as phosphorus and nitrate. This is likely to be advantageous in areas with infertile soils and less important in areas with more favourable soil chemistry, as in fertile forests. In fire-prone areas, depth of burial is an important factor for successful post-burn germination. This, in turn, is influenced by the nesting habits of the myrmecochorous ants. As such, the value of directed dispersal is largely context-dependent.

=== Seed predator avoidance ===
Myrmecochorous plants escape or avoid seed predation by granivores when ants remove and sequester diaspores. This benefit is particularly pronounced in areas where myrmecochorous plants are subject to heavy seed predation, which may be common. In mesic forest habitats, seed predators remove around 60% of all dispersed seeds within a few days, and eventually remove all seeds not removed by ants. In addition to attracting ants, elaiosomes also appeal to granivores, and their presence can increase seed predation rates.

=== Nature of the interaction ===
Myrmecochory is traditionally thought to be a diffuse or facultative mutualism with low specificity between myrmecochores and individual ant species. This assertion has been challenged in a study of Iberian myrmecochores, demonstrating the disproportionate importance of specific ant species in dispersing seeds. Ant-plant interactions with a single species of myrmecochore were recorded for 37 species of ants, but only two of these were found to disperse diaspores to any significant degree; the rest were seed predators or "cheaters" opportunistically feeding on elaiosomes in situ without dispersing seeds. Larger diaspores are hypothesized to increase the degree of specialization, since ant mutualists need to be larger to successfully carry the diaspore back to the nest.

Ants, however, do not appear to form obligate relationships with myrmecochorous plants. Since no known ant species relies entirely on elaiosomes for their nutritional needs, ants remain generalist foragers even when entering into relationships with a more specialized myrmecochore.

As with many other facultative mutualisms, cheating is present on both sides of the interaction. Ants cheat by consuming elaiosomes without transporting seeds or through outright seed predation. Myrmecochorous plants can also cheat, either by producing diaspores with nonremovable elaiosomes or by simulating the presence of a nonexistent reward with chemical cues. Ants are sometimes capable of discriminating between cheaters and mutualists as shown by studies demonstrating preference for the diaspores of noncheating myrmecochores. Cheating is also inhibited by ecological interactions external to the myrmecochorous interaction; simple models suggest that predation exerts a stabilizing influence on a mutualism such as myrmecochory.

== Myrmecochory and invasive species ==
Myrmecochores are threatened by invasive species in some ecosystems. For instance, the Argentine ant is an aggressive invader capable of displacing native ant populations. Since Argentine ants do not disperse seeds, invasions may lead to a breakdown in the myrmecochory mutualism, inhibiting the dispersal ability of myrmecochores and causing long-term alterations in plant community dynamics. Invasive ant species can also maintain seed dispersal in their introduced range, as is the case with the red fire ant in the Southeastern United States. Some invasive ants are also seed-disperses in their native range, such as the European fire ant, and can act as a high-quality disperser in their introduced range

In South Africa, the Argentine ant has in some cases displaced native ants that disperse the seeds of Fynbos plants like Mimetes cucullatus. The Argentine ants don't take the seeds underground and leave them on the surface, resulting in ungerminated plants and the dwindling of Fynbos seed reserves after veld fires.

Myrmecochorous plants are also capable of invading ecosystems. These invaders may gain an advantage in areas where native ants disperse invasive seeds. Similarly, the spread of myrmecochorous invaders may be inhibited by limitations in the ranges of native ant populations.

== See also ==
- Myrmecophily
- Myrmecophyte
