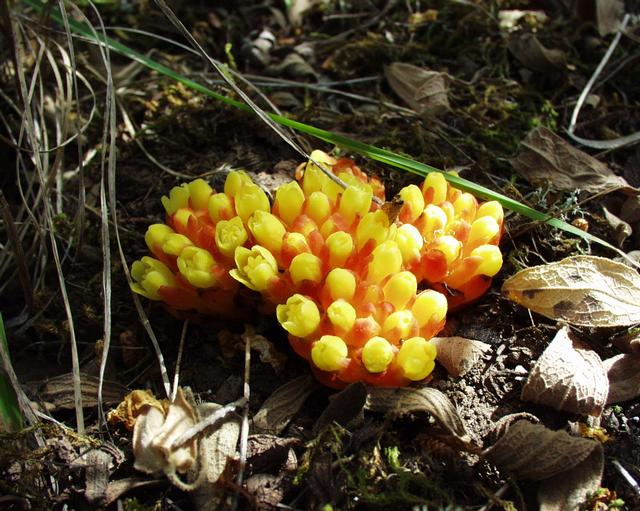
- Cytinus hypocistis

Scientific classification
- Kingdom: Plantae
- Clade: Tracheophytes
- Clade: Angiosperms
- Clade: Eudicots
- Clade: Rosids
- Order: Malvales
- Family: Cytinaceae; A.Rich.

Genera
- Cytinus; Bdallophytum

= Cytinaceae =

Family of flowering plants

Cytinaceae is a family of parasitic flowering plants. It comprises two genera, Cytinus and Bdallophytum, totalling ten species.

These two genera were formerly placed in the family Rafflesiaceae, order Malpighiales. When they were separated into a new family, it was initially placed in Malpighiales, but it has since been recognised as belonging to order Malvales.
