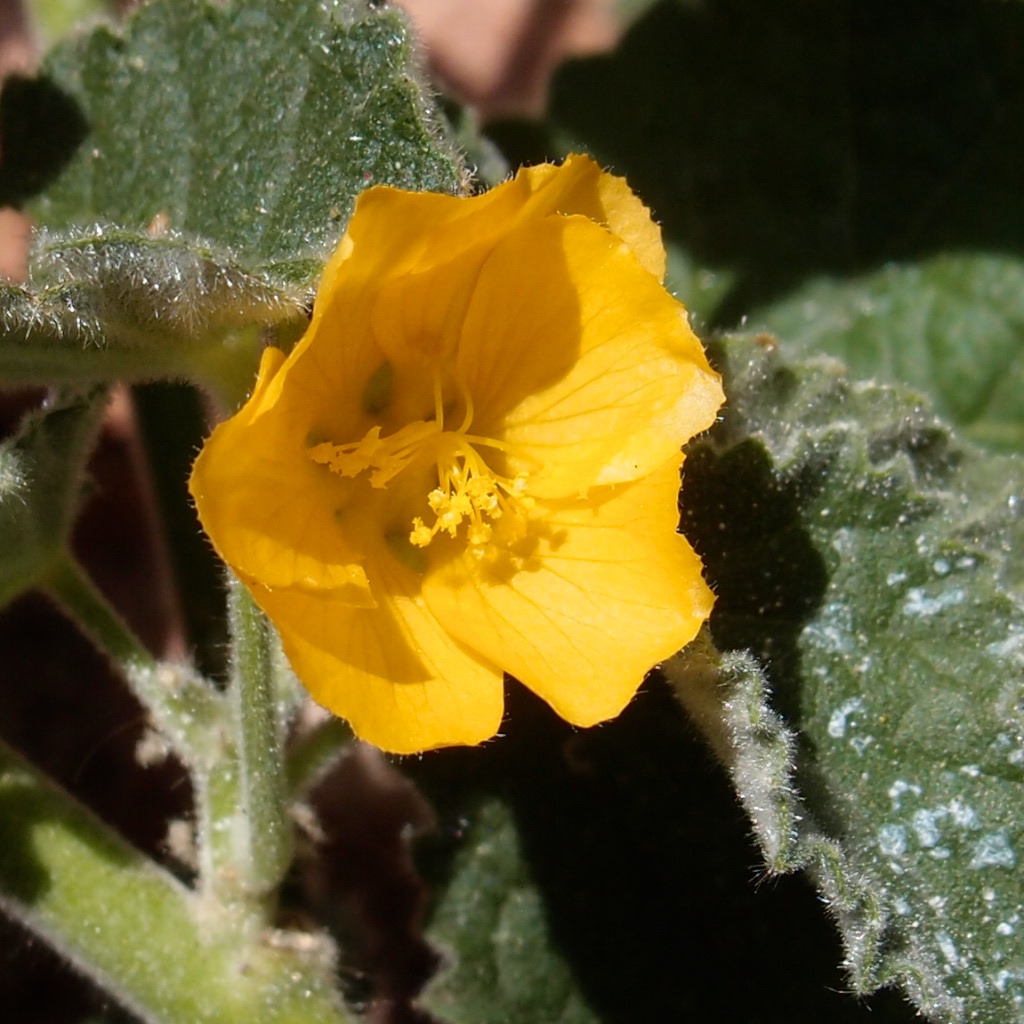

Conservation status
- Vulnerable (NatureServe)

Scientific classification
- Kingdom: Plantae
- Clade: Tracheophytes
- Clade: Angiosperms
- Clade: Eudicots
- Clade: Rosids
- Order: Malvales
- Family: Malvaceae
- Genus: Abutilon
- Species: A. parishii

Binomial name
- Abutilon parishii S.Watson

= Abutilon parishii =

Species of flowering plant

Abutilon parishii is a species of flowering plant in the mallow family known by the common names Parish's Indian mallow and Pima Indian mallow. It is native to Arizona in the United States and Sonora in Mexico.

This plant is a shrubby perennial herb growing |up to about a meter tall, but known to reach 1.9 metres (6 ft 3 in) in maximum height. There is a single stem or multiple stems which are coated in glandular hairs. They are mostly naked with occasional leaves. The leaves are oval or heart shaped and have toothed edges. They are up to 10 centimetres (3.9 in) long. They are velvety in texture, dark green on top and pale to almost white underneath. The flowers occur in the leaf axils. They have pale orange petals about a centimeter long. The flowers open, if at all, for a few hours in the late afternoon to evening. The fruit is a schizocarp containing 6 to 8 mericarps. The fruits open and release seeds in June and again after summer rains. The seeds do not germinate easily; older seeds are more likely to germinate than newer.

In Arizona this plant grows in several mountain ranges, including the Superstition, Tortolita, Santa Catalina, Tucson, Rincon, and Santa Rita Mountains. The plant grows in rocky habitat, such as canyon slopes. Other plants in the habitat include jojoba, saguaro, triangle bur ragweed, hoary abutilon, ocotillo, and Palmer's abutilon.

In 2001 there were 84 populations of the plant known in Arizona and Sonora, located in 17 mountain ranges. Most are small, with just a few individuals. The plant is in cultivation at the Desert Botanical Garden in Phoenix, Arizona.
