= Abutilon × milleri =

Scientific classification
- Kingdom: Plantae
- Clade: Tracheophytes
- Clade: Angiosperms
- Clade: Eudicots
- Clade: Rosids
- Order: Malvales
- Family: Malvaceae
- Genus: Abutilon
- Species: A. × milleri

Binomial name
- Abutilon × milleri

Species of flowering plant

Abutilon × milleri, also known as Miller abutilon, is a hybrid species, the result of cross of A. megapotamicum and possibly A. pictum, in the family Malvaceae. It is an evergreen species of flowering plant. It has gained the Royal Horticultural Society's Award of Garden Merit as an ornamental.

== Description ==
Abutilon × milleri is a highly branched shrub that can grow up to 2m tall. They have 3-lobed leaves and bell-shaped flowers that are around 4cm long with yellow-orange petals.

== Cultivation ==
They prefer to grow in weakly acidic to neutral, well-drained, loam soil under full sun. They can also be propagated with cuttings, although hardwood cuttings can only be propagated in autumn. They can tolerate temperatures as low as −10 °C. In addition, they have resistance to honey fungus.

== Uses ==
=== Ornamental ===
Miller abutilon plants are popular garden plants, due to their floral display.

=== As food ===
This plant is edible. It may be eaten cooked or raw and is said to have a sweet taste.
