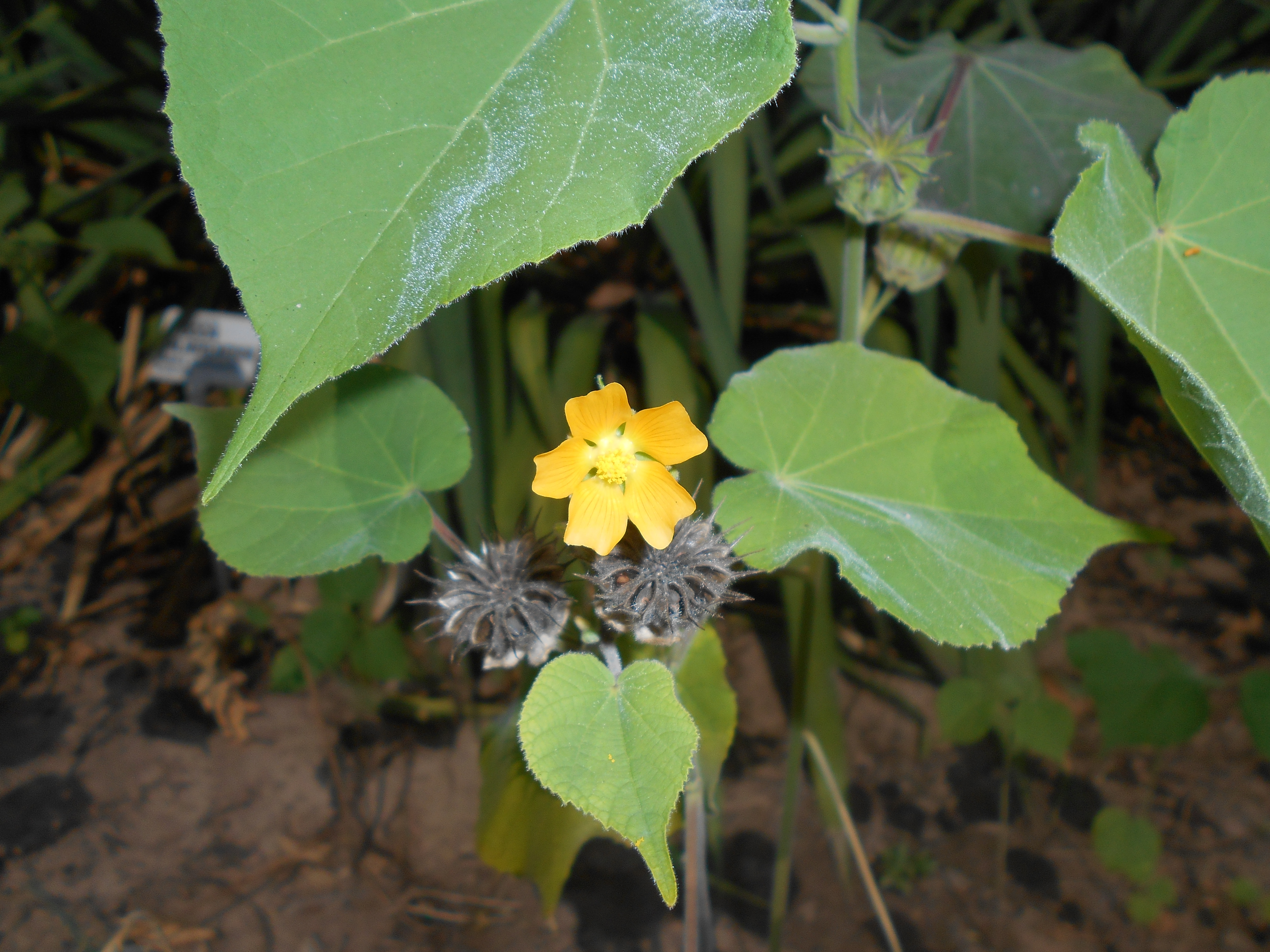
- Abutilon theophrasti

Scientific classification
- Kingdom: Plantae
- Clade: Embryophytes
- Clade: Tracheophytes
- Clade: Spermatophytes
- Clade: Angiosperms
- Clade: Eudicots
- Clade: Rosids
- Order: Malvales
- Family: Malvaceae
- Subfamily: Malvoideae
- Tribe: Malveae
- Genus: Abutilon; Mill.

Diversity
- c. 180 species

Synonyms
- Abortopetalum O.Deg.; Abutilaea F.Muell.; Abutilothamnus Ulbr.; Bastardia Kunth; Bastardiopsis (K.Schum.) Hassl.; Beloere Shuttlew.

= Abutilon =

Genus of flowering plants

Abutilon /əˈbjuːtɪlɒn/ is a large genus of flowering plants in the mallow family, Malvaceae. It is distributed throughout the tropics and subtropics of the Americas, Africa, Asia, and Australia. General common names include Indian mallow and velvetleaf; ornamental varieties may be known as room maple, parlor maple, or flowering maple. The genus name is an 18th-century Neo-Latin word that came from the Arabic ’abū-ṭīlūn (أبو طيلون), the name given by Avicenna to this or a similar genus.

The type species is Abutilon theophrasti. Several species formerly placed in Abutilon, including the cultivated species Abutilon pictum and hybrids commonly known as "flowering maples", were transferred to the new genus Callianthe in 2012.

== Description ==
Plants of this genus include herbs, shrubs, and trees. They range in height from about 0.5 to 3 meters (1.6 to 9.8 feet). The herbage is generally hairy to woolly or bristly. The leaf blades are usually entire, but the occasional species has lobed leaves. They are palmately veined and have wavy or serrated edges. Flowers are solitary, paired, or borne in small inflorescences in the leaf axils or toward the branch tips. The calyx is bell-shaped with five lobes. The corolla is usually bell-shaped to wheel-shaped, with five petals joined at the bases.

The flowers of wild species are most often yellow or orange, but can be red or pinkish, sometimes with a darker center. The stamens are fused into a tube lined at the mouth with anthers. Inside the tube is the branching style with head-like stigmas. The fruit is a rounded or hemispherical schizocarp with up to 20 segments, each containing a few seeds.

== Selected species ==
- Abutilon bivalve (Cav.) Dorr
- Abutilon cryptopetalum (F.Muell.) Benth.
- Abutilon eremitopetalum Caum – hiddenpetal Indian mallow (Lānaʻi in Hawaii)
- Abutilon fraseri (Hook.f.) Walp. - Dwarf lantern-flower
- Abutilon fruticosum Guill. & Perr. – Texas Indian mallow
- Abutilon grandifolium (Willd.) Sweet – hairy Indian mallow
- Abutilon guineense (Schumach.) Baker f. & Exell
- Abutilon halophilum F.Muell. ex Schltdl.
- Abutilon hulseanum Torr. ex A.Gray
- Abutilon incanum (Link) Sweet – hoary abutilon, pelotazo (Southwestern United States, northern Mexico, Hawaii)
- Abutilon indicum (L.) Sweet – Indian abutilon, Indian lantern-flower, monkeybush
- Abutilon julianae Endl.
- Abutilon lepidum (F.Muell.) A.S.Mitch.
- Abutilon leucopetalum (F.Muell.) F.Muell. ex Benth. – desert Chinese-lantern
- Abutilon listeri Baker f.
- Abutilon menziesii Seem. – koʻoloaʻula (Hawaii)
- Abutilon otocarpum F.Muell.
- Abutilon oxycarpum (F.Muell.) F.Muell. ex Benth. – small-leaved abutilon
- Abutilon palmeri A.Gray – Palmer's Indian mallow
- Abutilon pannosum (G.Forst.) Schltdl.
- Abutilon parishii A.Watson – Parish's Indian mallow
- Abutilon parvulum A.Gray – dwarf Indian mallow
- Abutilon persicum (Burm.f.) Merr.
- Abutilon pitcairnense Fosberg
- Abutilon sachetianum Fosberg
- Abutilon sandwicense (O.Deg.) Christoph. – greenflower Indian mallow (Oahʻu in Hawaii)
- Abutilon theophrasti Medik. – butterprint, abutilon-hemp, China-jute, velvetleaf (in USA), swamp Chinese-lantern, common yellow mallow

=== Hybrids ===
- Abutilon × hybridum (unknown parentage)

=== Formerly placed here ===
- Corynabutilon vitifolium (Cav.) Kearney (as A. vitifolium (Cav.) C.Presl)
- Pseudabutilon thurberi (A.Gray) Fryxell (as A. thurberi A.Gray)
- Callianthe megapotamica (A.Spreng.) Dorr (as A. megapotamicum (A.Spreng.) A.St.-Hil. & Naudin)
- Callianthe × milleri (Anon.) J.C.David (as A. × milleri Anon.; A. megapotamicum × A. pictum)
- Callianthe picta (Gillies ex Hook. & Arn.) Donnell (as A. pictum (Gillies ex Hook. & Arn.) Walp.)
- Callianthe striata (G.F.Dicks. ex Lindl.) Donnell (as A. striatum G.F.Dicks. ex Lindl.)

== Cultivation ==
Some abutilons are cultivated as garden plants. Several hybrids and cultivars have been developed.

Cultivars, hybrids, and species that have gained the Royal Horticultural Society's Award of Garden Merit include:

- A. megapotamicum
- A. × milleri
- 'Canary Bird'
- 'Cannington Carol'
- 'Cannington Peter'
- 'Kentish Belle'
- 'Linda Vista Peach'
- 'Marion'
- 'Nabob'
- 'Orange Glow'
- 'Savitzii'
- 'Souvenir de Bonn'
- 'Veronica Tennant'

Abutilons can be propagated from seed or via cuttings. A. megapoticum is grown as a house plant, but needs considerable light, including several hours of sunlight per day, and moderate temperatures of 61 to 74 °F (16 to 23 °C). The best potting medium is a loose soil rich in organic material and sand and watered when dry to the touch. The amount of watering should be reduced from November to March and the plant pruned back one third at the end of this rest period. The plant is prone to attack by scale insects. The plant is best replaced every two to three years with new specimens.

== Gallery ==
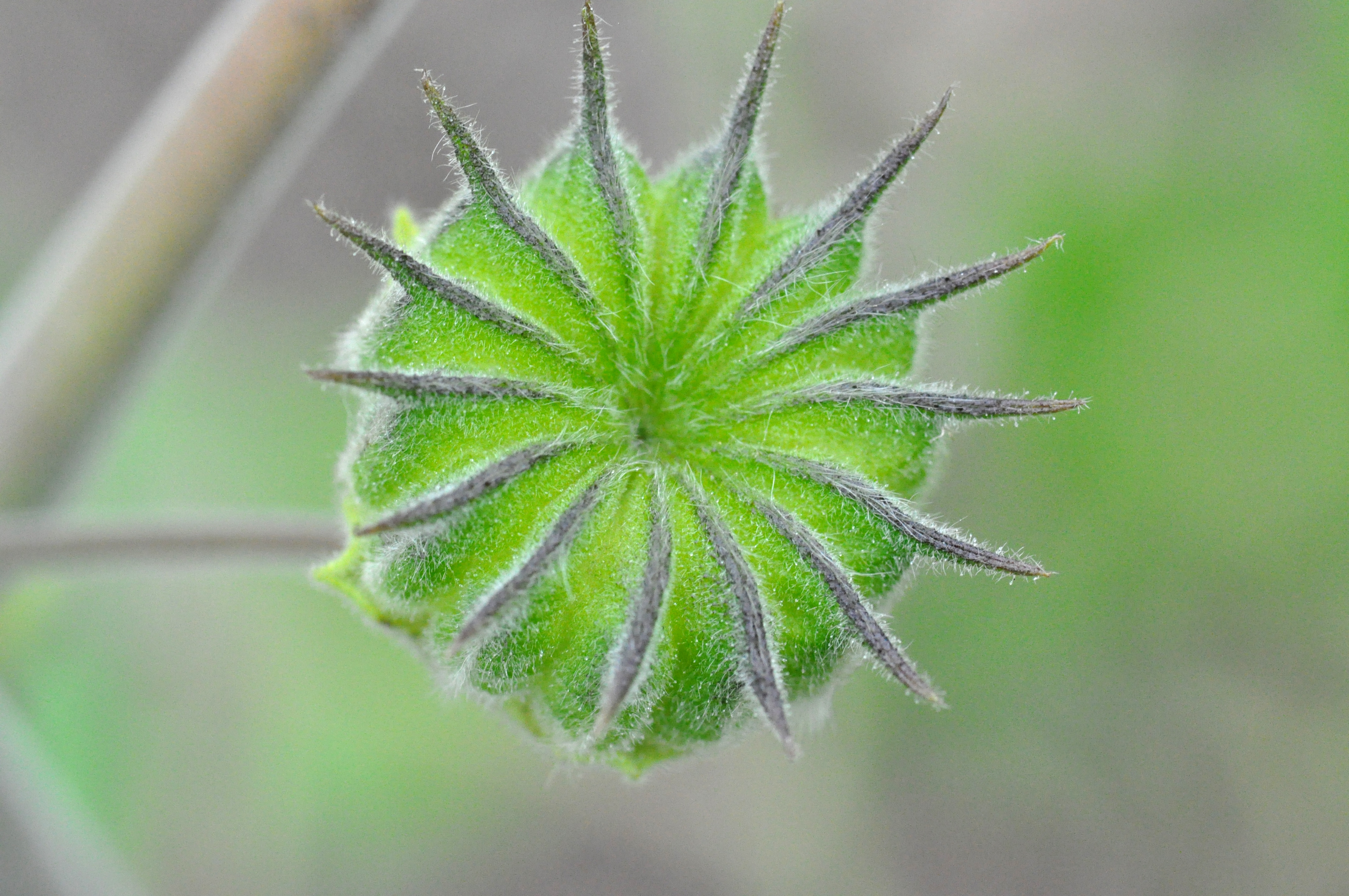
Abutilon theophrasti

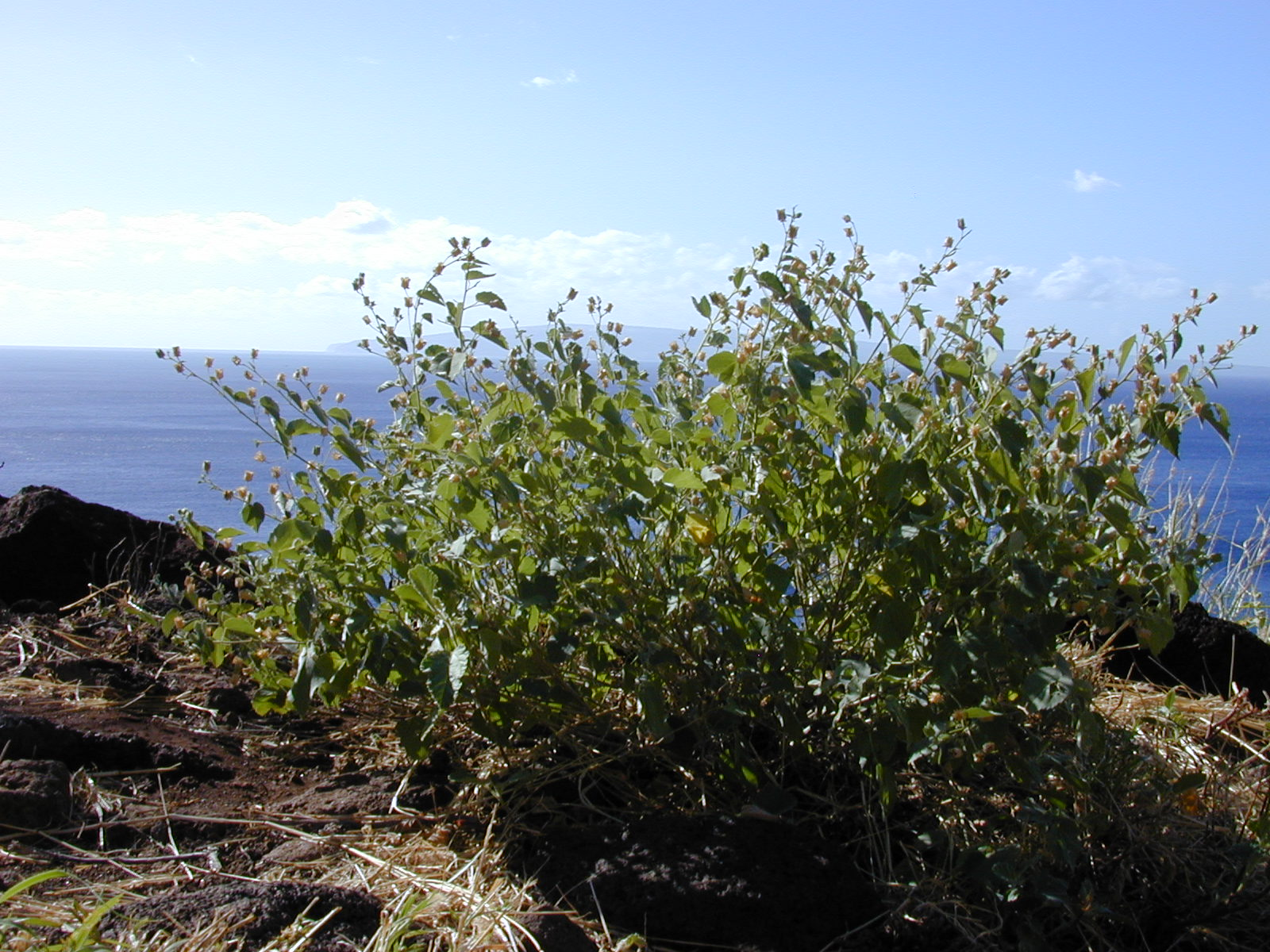
Abutilon incanum

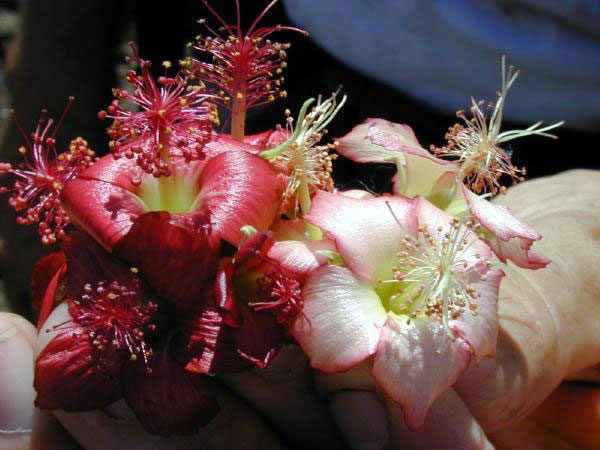
Abutilon menziesii

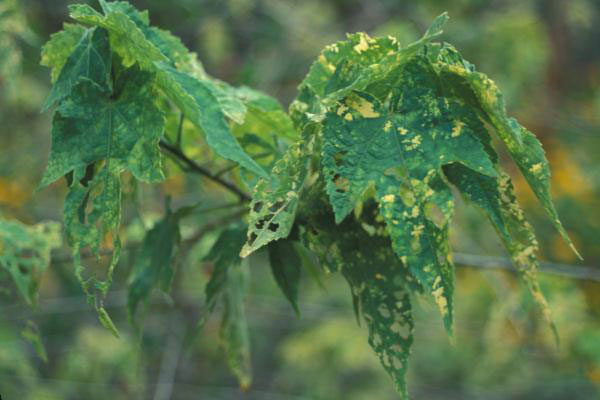
Abutilon pictum

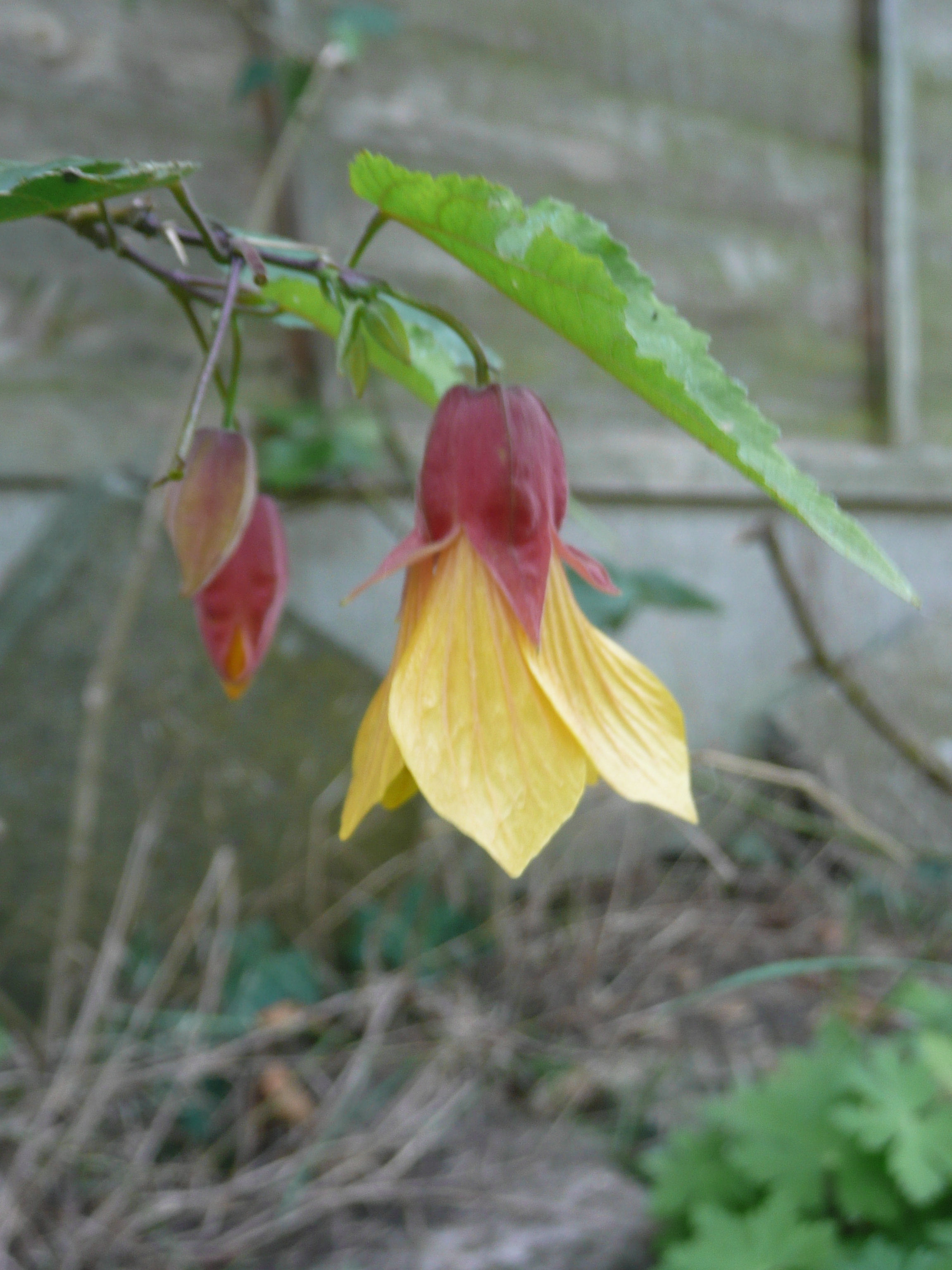
Abutilon 'Kentish Belle'

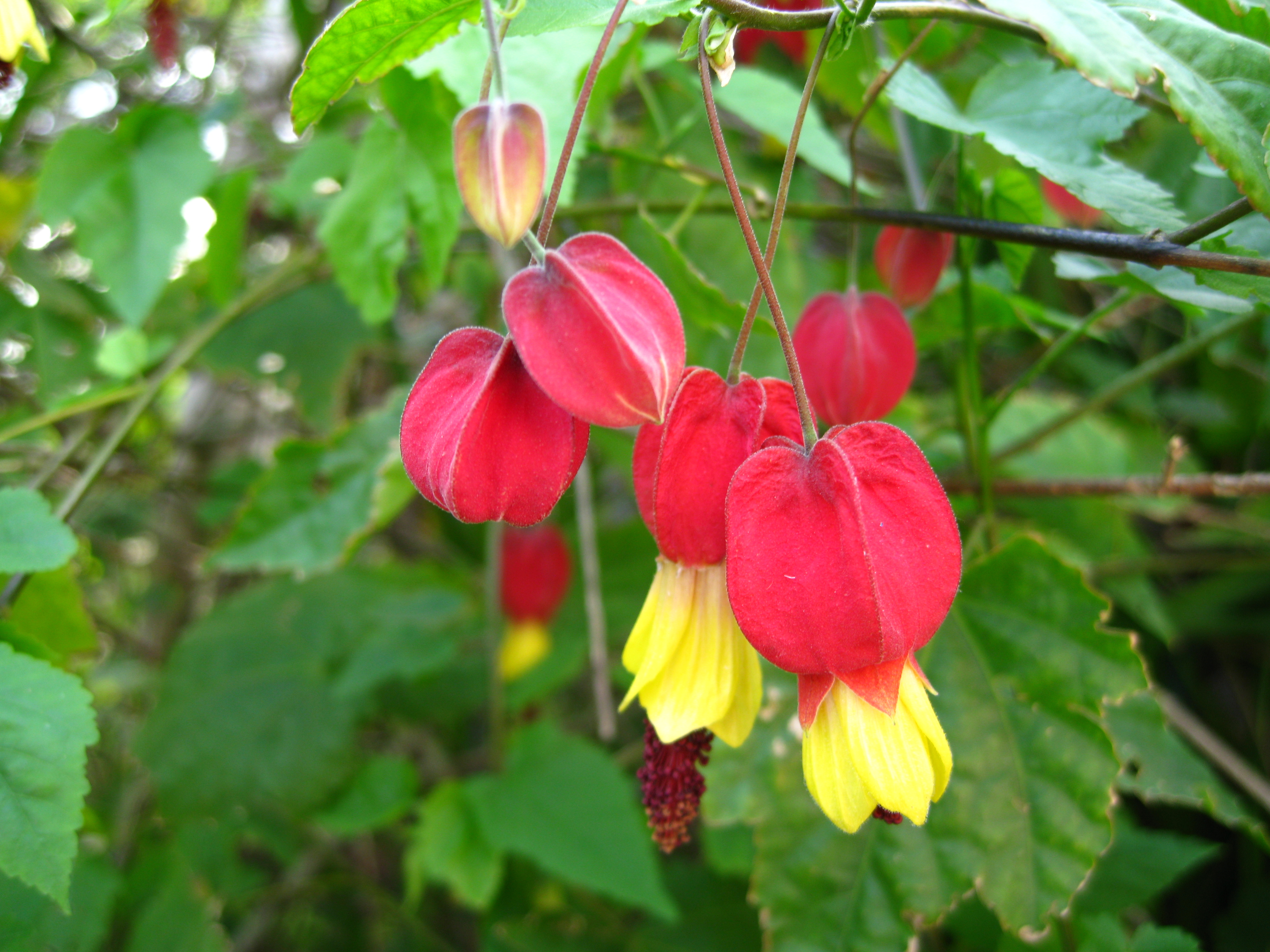
Abutilon megapotamicum

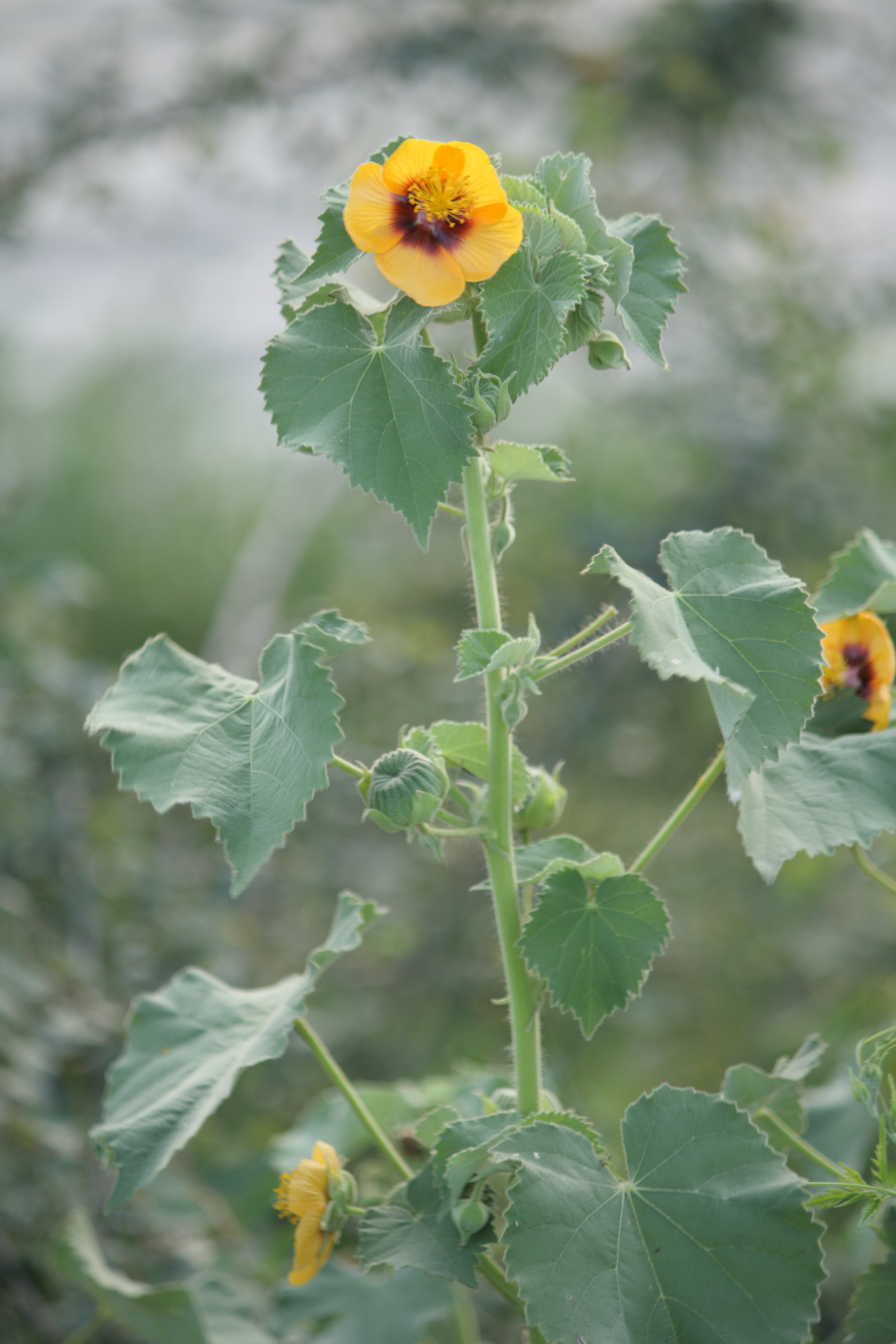
Abutilon indicum

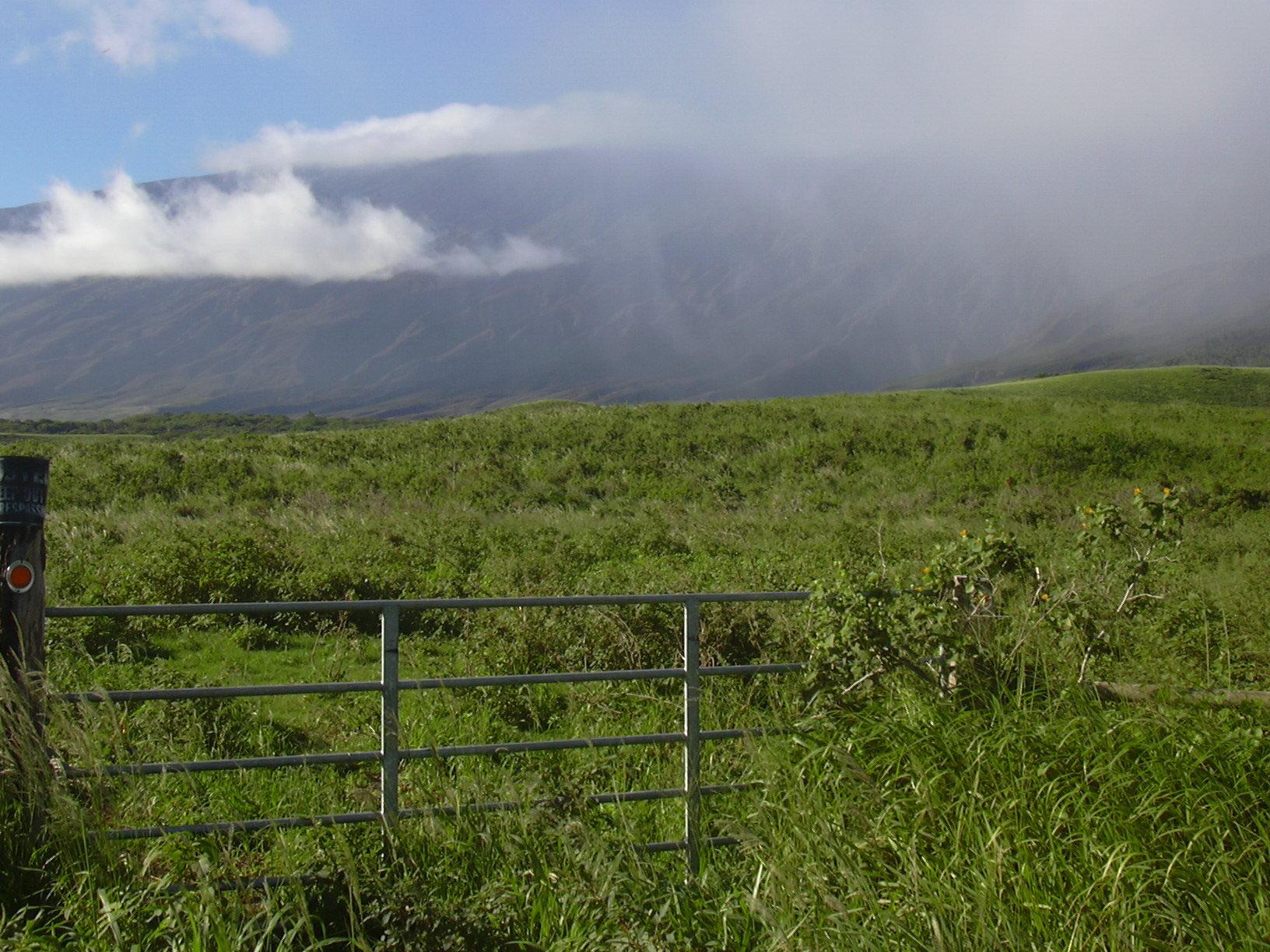
Abutilon grandifolium
