= Abutilon bivalve =

Scientific classification
- Kingdom: Plantae
- Clade: Tracheophytes
- Clade: Angiosperms
- Clade: Eudicots
- Clade: Rosids
- Order: Malvales
- Family: Malvaceae
- Genus: Abutilon
- Species: A. bivalve

Binomial name
- Abutilon bivalve (Cav.) Dorr (2014): Bastardia bivalvis (Cav.) Kunth ex Griseb. (1859); Bastardia bivalvis var. typica Hochr. (1917), not validly publ.; Sida bivalvis Cav. (1785); Abutilon erosum Schltdl. (1837); Abutilon weberbaueri Ulbr. (1916); Bastardia aristata Turcz. (1858); Bastardia berlandieri A.Gray (1887); Bastardia bivalvis var. aristata (Turcz.) Hochr. (1917); Bastardia elegans K.Schum. (1891); Bastardia limensis R.E.Fr. (1947); Bastardia spinifex Triana & Planch. (1862); Bastardia viscosa var. fragrans (L'Hér.) Baker f. (1893); Sida fragrans L'Hér. (1789); Sida schlechtendahlii Steud. (1841); Sida suberosa D.Dietr. (1846), nom. illeg.; Sida viscosa Macfad. (1837), nom. illeg.

Species of flowering plant

Abutilon bivalve is a species of flowering plant (among the Malvales) in the Malvaceae family, a shrub (or subshrub) ranging from Mexico to northern Argentina, including the Greater Antilles.
