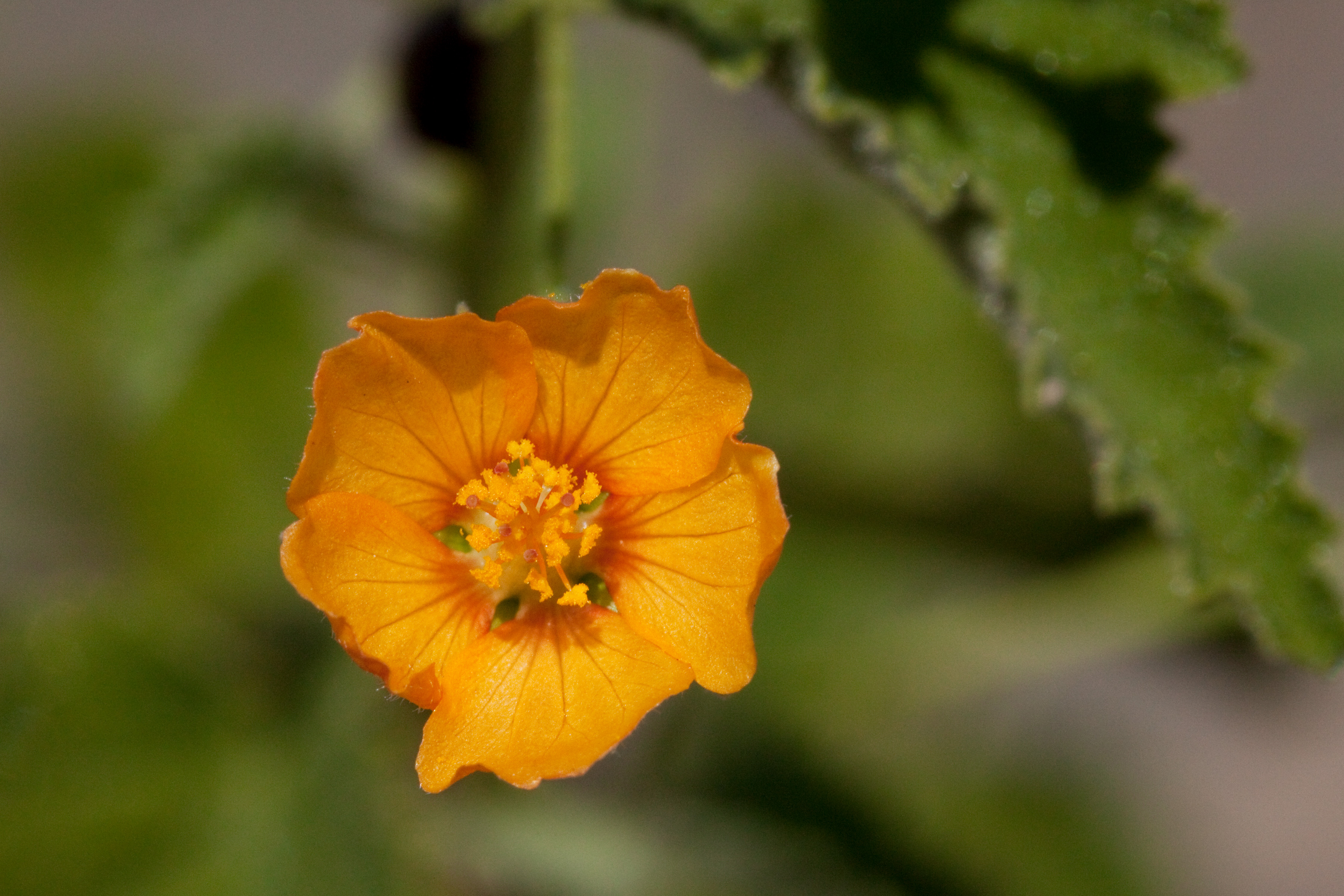

Conservation status
- Secure (NatureServe)

Scientific classification
- Kingdom: Plantae
- Clade: Tracheophytes
- Clade: Angiosperms
- Clade: Eudicots
- Clade: Rosids
- Order: Malvales
- Family: Malvaceae
- Genus: Abutilon
- Species: A. parvulum

Binomial name
- Abutilon parvulum A.Gray

= Abutilon parvulum =

Species of flowering plant

Abutilon parvulum is a species of flowering plant in the mallow family known by the common names dwarf Indian mallow and dwarf abutilon and native to the southwestern United States and northern Mexico.

This is a perennial herb growing from a woody root and producing a multibranched stem to a maximum height near 40 centimetres (16 in). The oval or heart-shaped leaves are 1 to 4 centimetres (0.39 to 1.57 in) wide. The stem and foliage are covered thinly in woolly hairs. The solitary flowers have light orange to red rounded petals just a few millimeters long. The fruit is a fuzzy body nearly a centimeter long divided into five segments.
