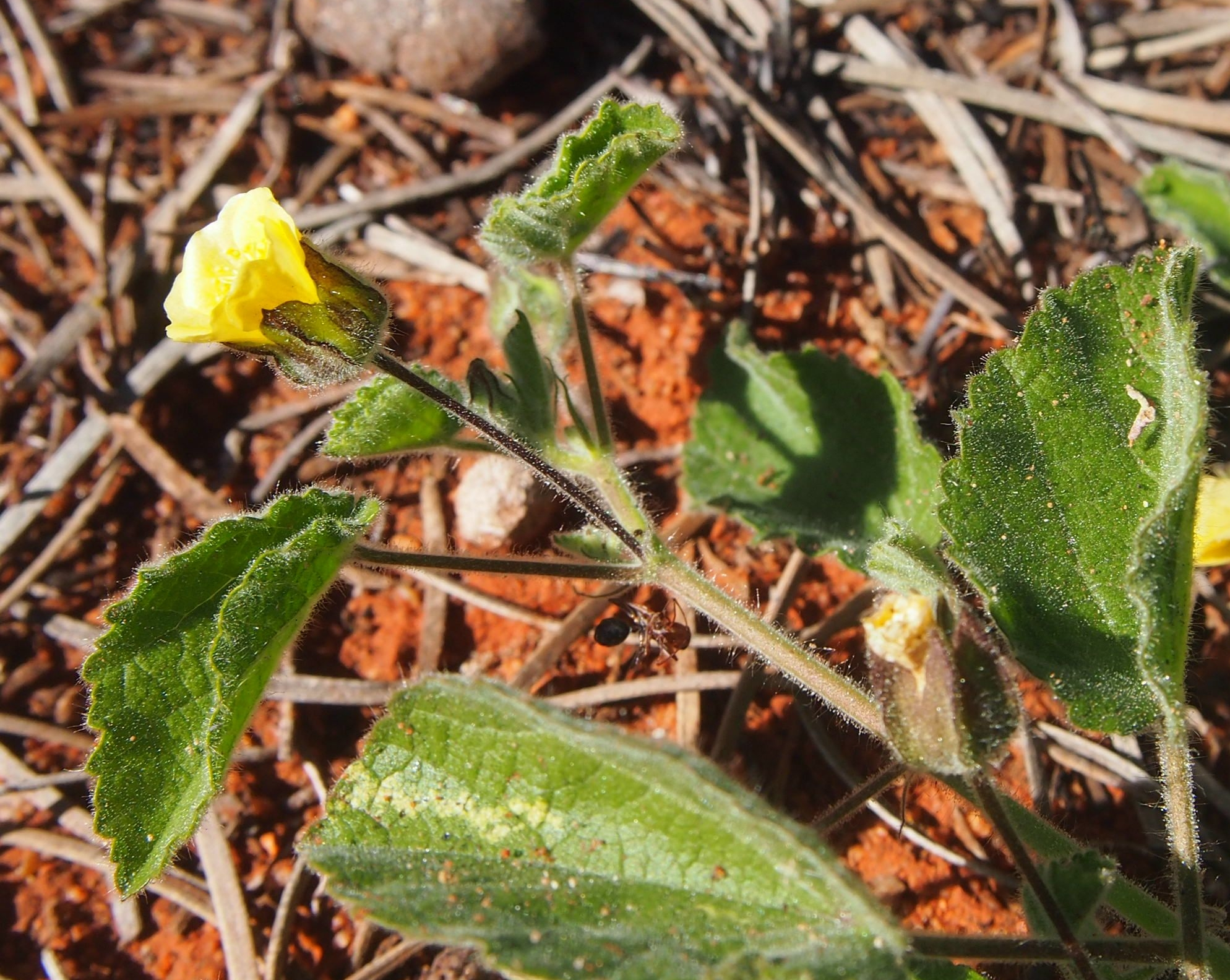

Scientific classification
- Kingdom: Plantae
- Clade: Tracheophytes
- Clade: Angiosperms
- Clade: Eudicots
- Clade: Rosids
- Order: Malvales
- Family: Malvaceae
- Genus: Abutilon
- Species: A. cryptopetalum

Binomial name
- Abutilon cryptopetalum (F.Muell.) F.Muell. ex Benth.

= Abutilon cryptopetalum =

Species of mallow

Abutilon cryptopetalum is a flowering plant in the family Malvaceae. It is a small, upright shrub with yellow or cream-white flowers and variable shaped grey-green leaves and grows in New South Wales, South Australia, Western Australia and the Northern Territory.

== Description ==
Abutilon cryptopetalum is an upright, under-story shrub to 1.5 m (4 ft 11 in) high with blue-green soft cobweb like hairs and stems sometimes reddish. The leaves are more or less circular to oval or lance-shaped, 1.5–7 cm (0.59–2.76 in) long, heart-shaped at the base, margins roughly toothed and soft. The corolla is light yellow or cream-white, 10 mm (0.39 in) long, calyx 10 mm (0.39 in) long, lobes small, wide and tapering to a point. Flowering occurs in spring and the fruit has about 10 segments, 9–11 mm (0.35–0.43 in) in diameter and 10 mm (0.39 in) long.

== Taxonomy and naming ==
This species was first described in 1860 by Ferdinand von Mueller who gave it the name Sida cryptopetala. In 1863 George Bentham changed the name to Abutilon cryptopetalum from an unpublished name change by Mueller and the description was published in Flora Australiensis. The specific epithet (cryptopetalum) means "hidden petals".

== Distribution and habitat ==
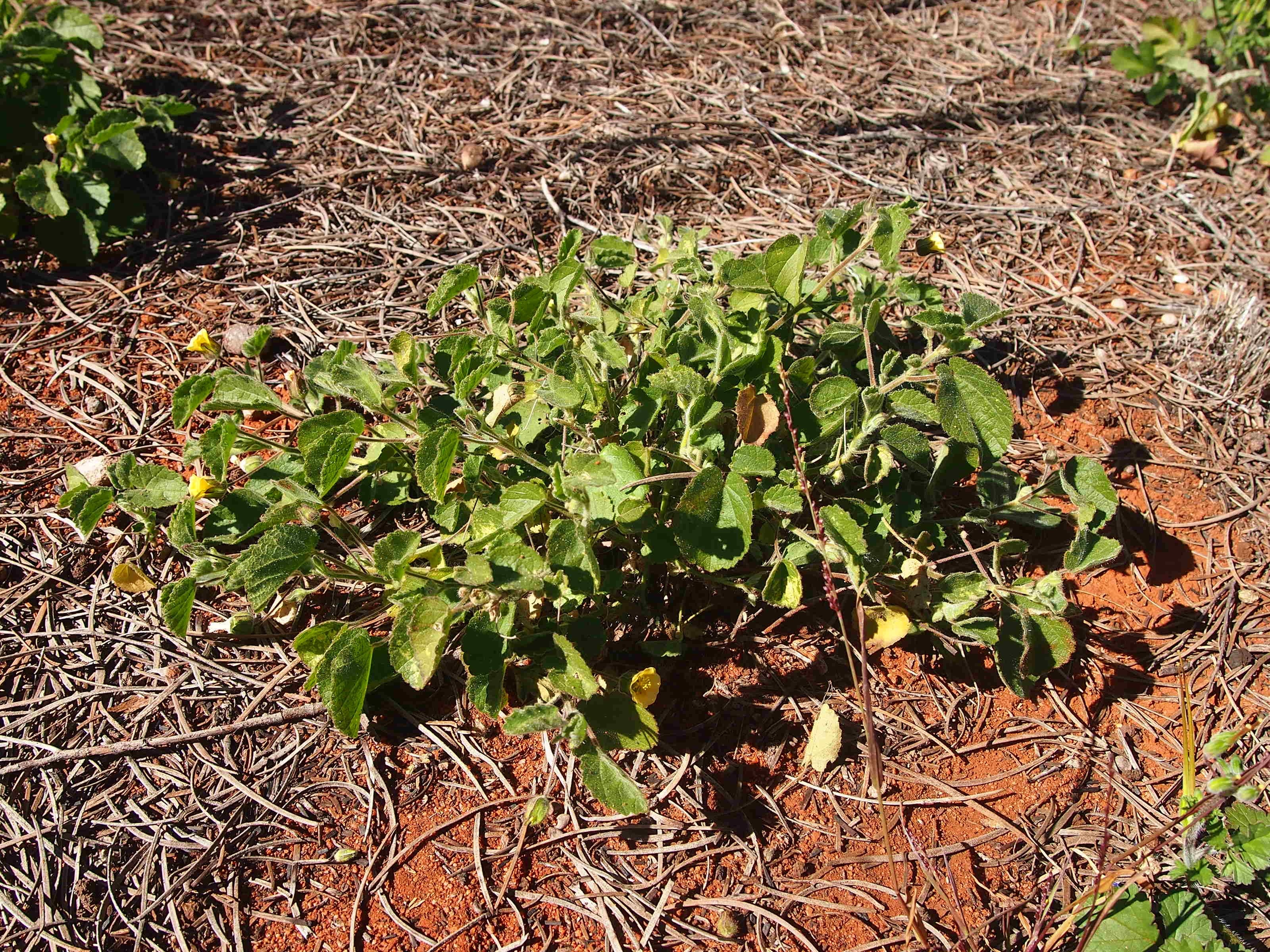
Abutilon cryptopetalum habit

This species grows on sandy gravel, near creeks, plains and rocky loam in New South Wales, South Australia, Western Australia and the Northern Territory.
