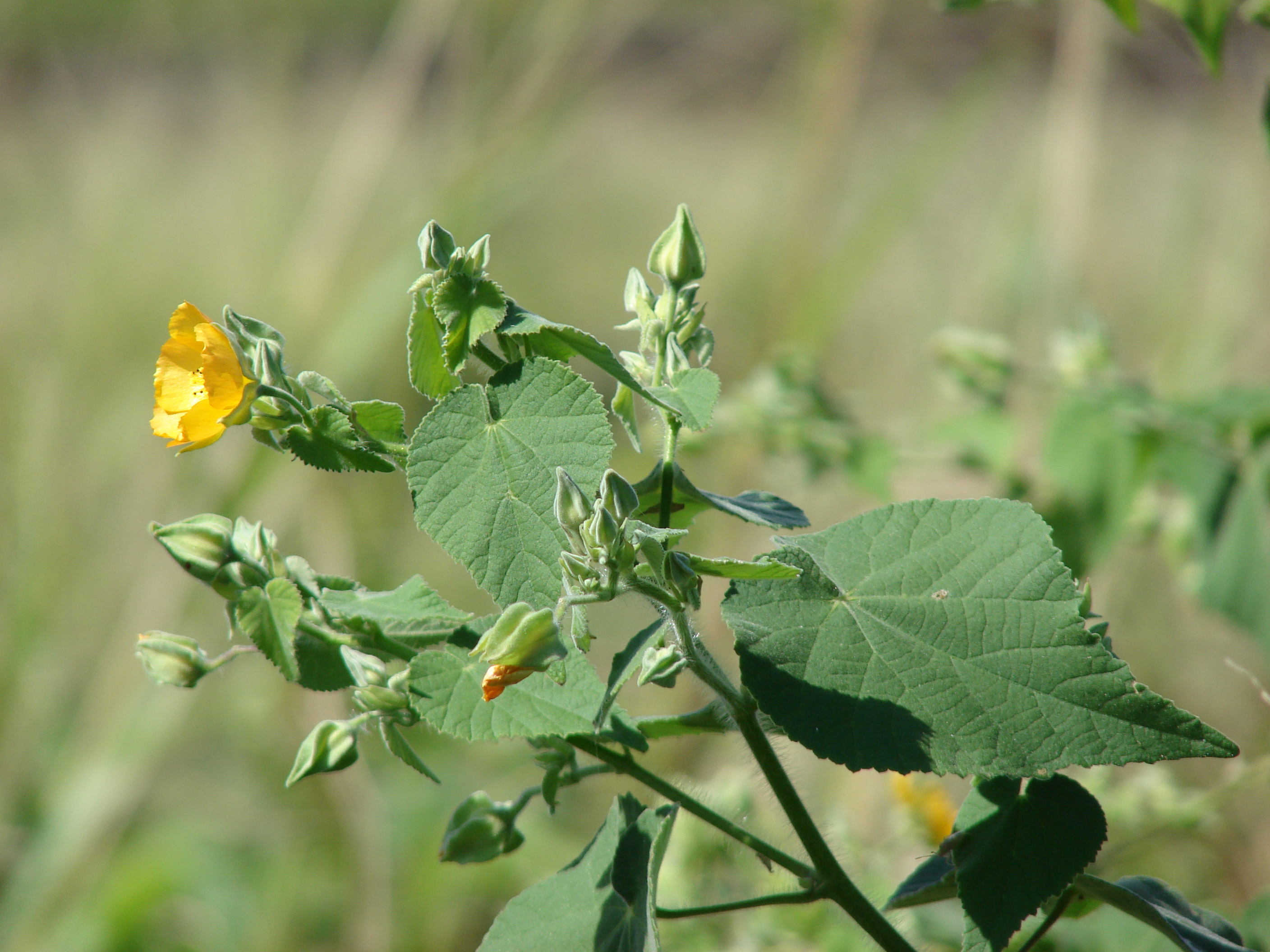

Scientific classification
- Kingdom: Plantae
- Clade: Tracheophytes
- Clade: Angiosperms
- Clade: Eudicots
- Clade: Rosids
- Order: Malvales
- Family: Malvaceae
- Genus: Abutilon
- Species: A. grandifolium

Binomial name
- Abutilon grandifolium (Willd.) Sweet

= Abutilon grandifolium =

Species of flowering shrub

Abutilon grandifolium, the hairy Indian mallow, is a large shrub that is up to 3 m (9.8 ft) high with broad, 3–18 cm (1.2–7.1 in) leaf blades. Flowers are axillary, with a yellow corolla 2–3.5 cm (0.8–1.4 in) across, composed of petals 1–1.5 cm (0.4–0.6 in) long. The fruits are ovoid-globular schizocarps that are 1–1.5 cm (0.4–0.6 in) in diameter and composed of ten shortly beaked mericarps, containing 2-3 seeds each.

A. grandifolium can be distinguished from A. theophrasti by long, simple hairs on the stem rather than stellate hairs.

== Distribution ==
The species is native to tropical America and Central and South Africa, but it is naturalised in other parts of the world, including the Canary Islands, Hawaii, and throughout shrubland and loamy areas of Australia. In Western Australia, it is found in the Swan Coastal Plain. Due to this species’ prolific seed production and propensity to spread, A. grandifolium is considered an invasive species in some of the regions where it grows, becoming a problematic weed in riparian zones, grasslands, and tall shrubland ecosystems throughout the world. In Hawaii, it is reported as having a detrimental effect on Spermolepis hawaiiensis and Scaevola coriacea, two endangered and threatened plant species.

== Threat level ==
A. grandifolium is considered an invasive or potentially invasive weed in Micronesia, Hawaii, Portugal, South Africa, and in parts of Australia (particularly southeastern Queensland and eastern New South Wales), and is not considered a threatened species.
