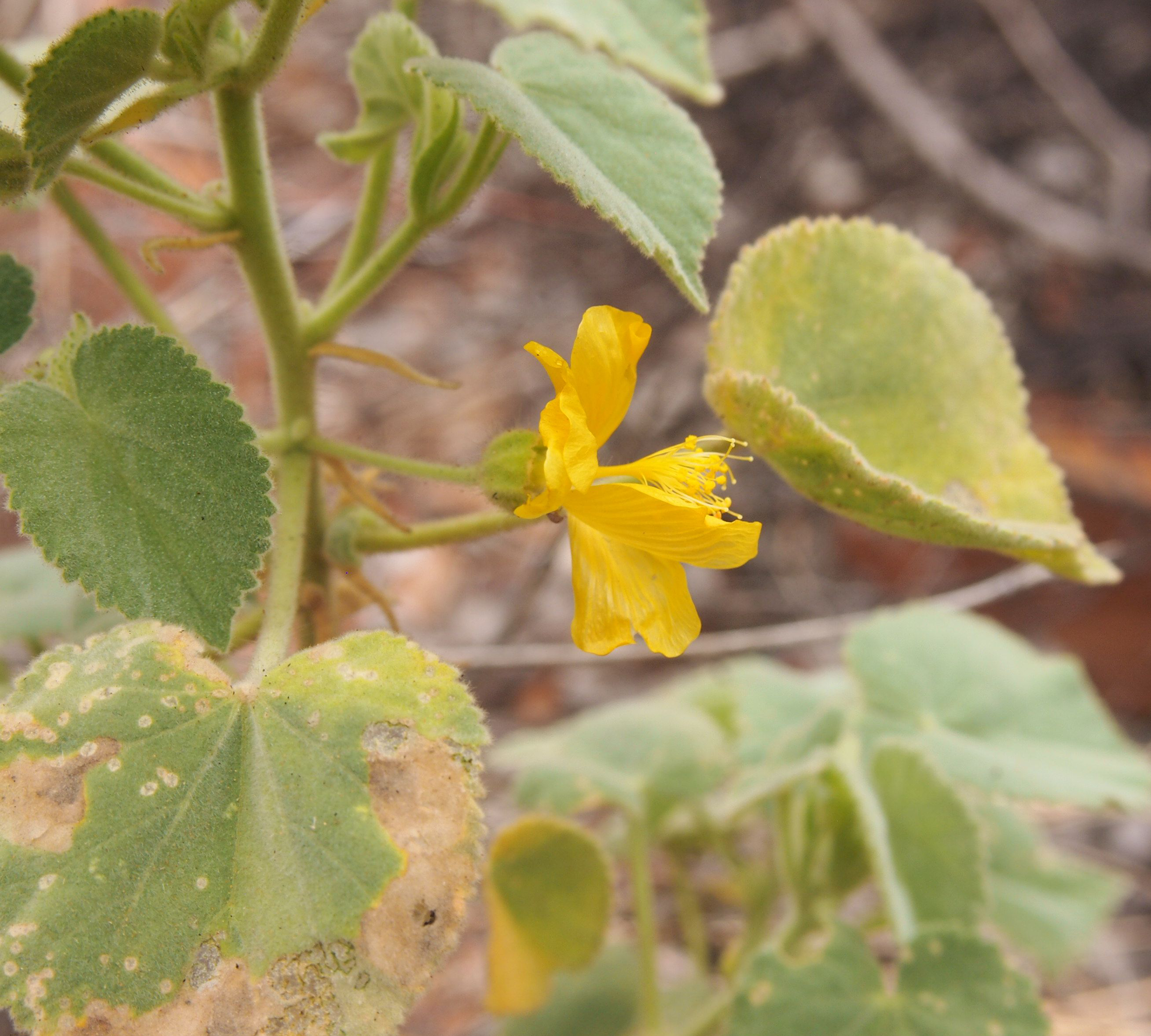

Scientific classification
- Kingdom: Plantae
- Clade: Tracheophytes
- Clade: Angiosperms
- Clade: Eudicots
- Clade: Rosids
- Order: Malvales
- Family: Malvaceae
- Genus: Abutilon
- Species: A. leucopetalum

Binomial name
- Abutilon leucopetalum (F.Muell.) F.Muell. ex Benth.

= Abutilon leucopetalum =

Desert Chinese-lantern

Species of mallow

Abutilon leucopetalum commonly known as desert Chinese lantern, is a flowering plant in the family Malvaceae and is endemic to Australia. It is a small shrub with yellow flowers and branches densely covered with soft hairs.

== Description ==
Abutilon leucopetalum is a small shrub to 1 m (3 ft 3 in) high or more with a dense covering on branches of thick, velvety, star-shaped hairs mixed with longer, spreading simple hairs including the lobes and calyx. The leaves are soft, somewhat thick, variably shaped including oval or oval-lance shaped, heart-shaped, scalloped, sometimes tapering to a point and mostly retain soft, smooth hairs on both surfaces. The flowers are yellow ageing to white, tubular bell-shaped, calyx about 14–20 mm (0.55–0.79 in) long, peduncle up to 3 cm (1.2 in) long. Flowering may occur at any time of the year and the fruit is a capsule 8–15 mm (0.31–0.59 in) in diameter, consisting of 7-10 segments containing 2 or 3 dark, softly hairy seeds.

== Taxonomy and naming ==
This species was described by Ferdinand von Mueller who gave it the name Sida leucopetala. In 1863 George Bentham changed the name to Abutilon leucopetalum from an unpublished name change by Mueller and the description was published in Flora Australiensis. The specific epithet (leucopetalum) means "white petalled".

== Distribution and habitat ==
Desert Chinese-lantern grows on ridges, rocky hills, creek beds and shallow soils in Queensland, New South Wales, Western Australia and the Northern Territory.
