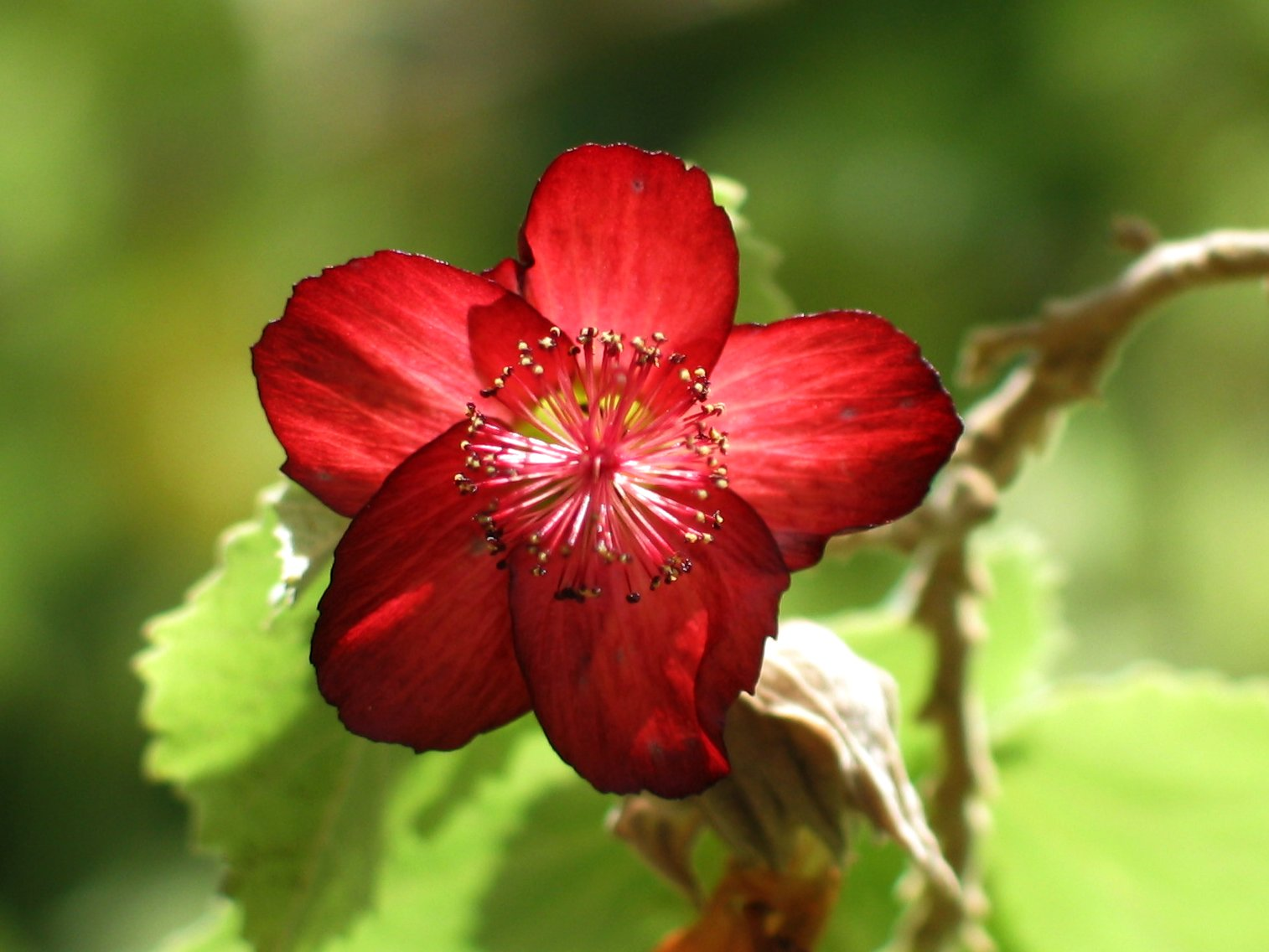

Conservation status
- Critically Endangered (IUCN 3.1)

Scientific classification
- Kingdom: Plantae
- Clade: Tracheophytes
- Clade: Angiosperms
- Clade: Eudicots
- Clade: Rosids
- Order: Malvales
- Family: Malvaceae
- Genus: Abutilon
- Species: A. menziesii

Binomial name
- Abutilon menziesii Seem.

= Abutilon menziesii =

Species of flowering plant

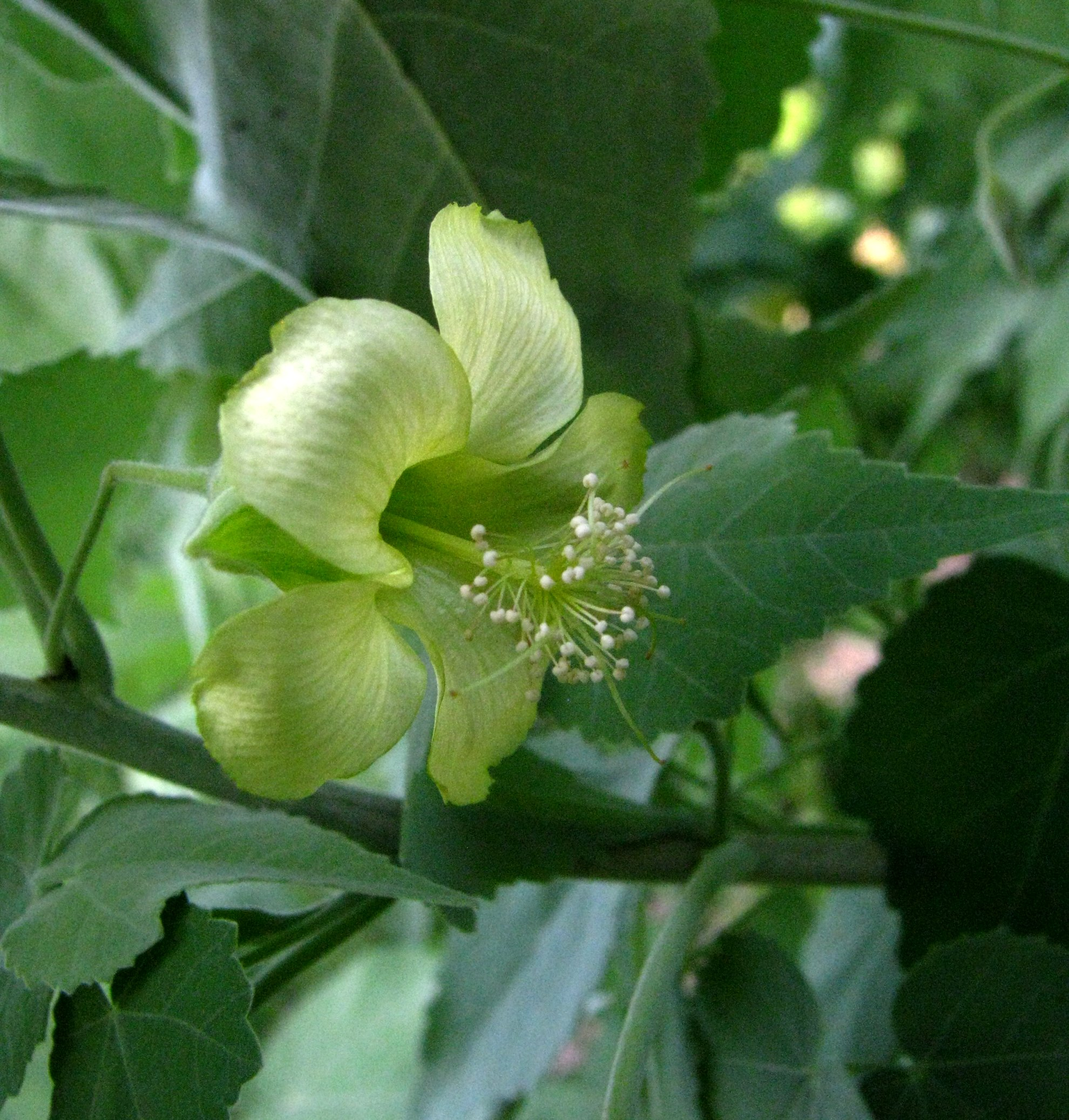
A rare blond-/butter coloured flower of A. menziesii

Abutilon menziesii, known as Koʻoloaʻula in Hawaiian, is a critically endangered species of flowering shrub in the family Malvaceae, that is endemic to Hawaii.

== Description ==
It is a sprawling shrub that can reach up to 10 feet in height. The leaves, which range from an inch in width to about five inches, vary in their shapes. They have a velvety feel to them. The small hibiscus-shaped flowers generally hang downward. Though charming up close, the flowers can be hidden by the much larger leaves and not often visible at a distance. Although the Hawaiian name ʻula refers to the more commonly seen red color, koʻoloa ʻula flowers are known in a range of colors: pink, pink and white, pale red, maroon, deep purplish-red (wine), salmon, and blond or butter. The center or staminal column is yellowish.

The plant is typically propagated by seeds. The seed capsules are pale brown, fuzzy, and about 3/8" long, typically containing 18-24 small, dark brown seeds.

It inhabits dry forests on the islands of Lānaʻi, Maui, Oʻahu and Hawaiʻi. It is classified as critically endangered by the IUCN Red List; only about 450–500 plants remain in fewer than ten naturally occurring populations throughout the islands. The rarity of this plant can be attributed to the alteration of its habitat for agricultural and urban development, overgrazing by livestock and feral animals, and competition from invasive weeds. A conservation plan is being implemented by federal and state agencies to protect remaining habitat, establish new populations, and conserve genetic material in seed banks and botanical gardens.
