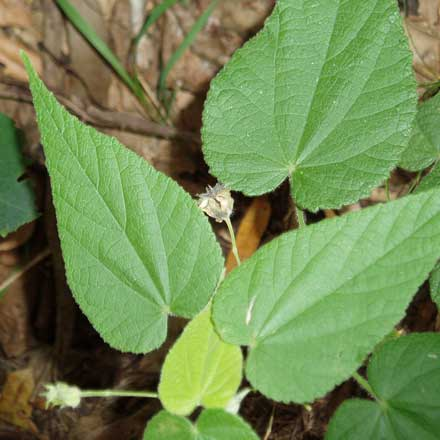

Scientific classification
- Kingdom: Plantae
- Clade: Tracheophytes
- Clade: Angiosperms
- Clade: Eudicots
- Clade: Rosids
- Order: Malvales
- Family: Malvaceae
- Genus: Abutilon
- Species: A. oxycarpum

Binomial name
- Abutilon oxycarpum (F.Muell.) Benth.

Synonyms
- Sida oxycarpa F.Muell.

= Abutilon oxycarpum =

Species of flowering plant

Abutilon oxycarpum, known as flannel weed, straggly lantern-bush, and small-leaved abutilon, is a malvaceous plant native to eastern Australia. It is found on hillsides or floodplains on red sand and limestone.

Flannel weed was first described by Ferdinand von Mueller as Sida oxycarpa in 1860.

== Description ==
It is a perennial herb growing up to 1.8 m (5 ft 11 in) tall, but usually not exceeding 0.9 m (2 ft 11 in). It is sometimes taller, up to 2.5 m (8 ft 2 in). The leaves of Abutilon oxycarpum are heart-shaped with fairly obvious veins. The leaf margins are toothed and slightly hairy and the stems are hairy. It flowers from May to September or October.
