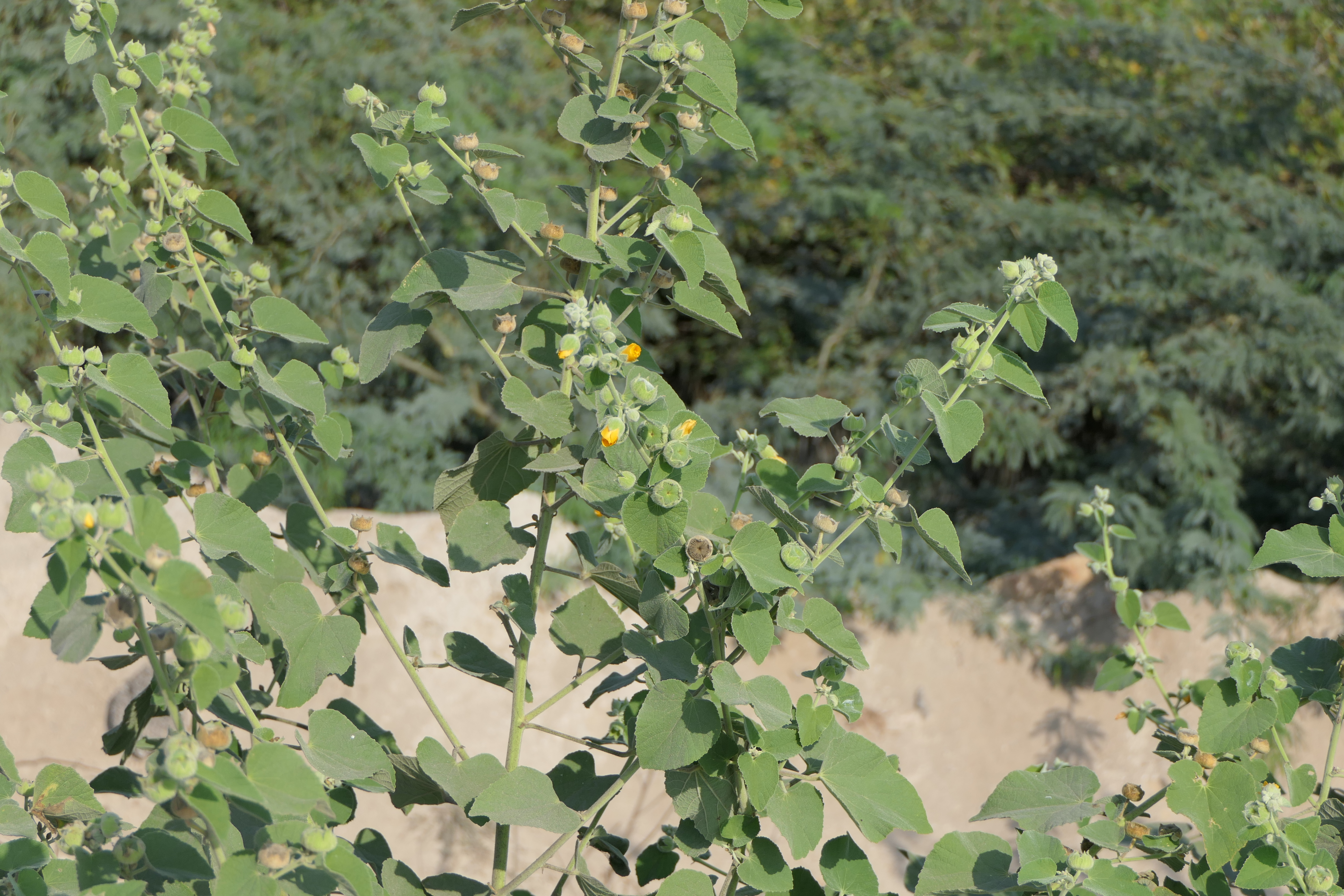

Scientific classification
- Kingdom: Plantae
- Clade: Tracheophytes
- Clade: Angiosperms
- Clade: Eudicots
- Clade: Rosids
- Order: Malvales
- Family: Malvaceae
- Genus: Abutilon
- Species: A. pannosum

Binomial name
- Abutilon pannosum (G.Forst.) Schltdl.

Synonyms
- Abutilon benadirense Mattei; Abutilon glaucum (Cav.) Sweet; Abutilon malirianum S.A.Husain & Baquar; Abutilon muticum (Delile ex DC.) Sweet; Abutilon muticum var. parvifolium Baker f.; Abutilon muticum var. villosum Webb; Abutilon tomentosum Wight & Arn.

= Abutilon pannosum =

Species of plant

Abutilon pannosum is a subshrub species of the family Malvaceae. It is a perennial shrub that grows up to 10 feet tall.

== Morphology ==
Velvety, cordate base shaped leaves, with wooly appearance at the lower surfaces while the upper surface are somewhat scabrous. 1.5 cm to 8cm long petiole. Erect stems and yellow-orange corolla and dark red or purple base.

Seeds are brownish-black and oval shaped.

== Distribution ==
Abutilon pannosum is native to many countries in tropical and Horn of Africa, Yemen, Egypt, Saudi Arabia, India and Pakistan.

== Utilisation ==
Abutilon pannosum's seed are used as a herbal laxative while its flower extracts are used for improving sexual performance.
