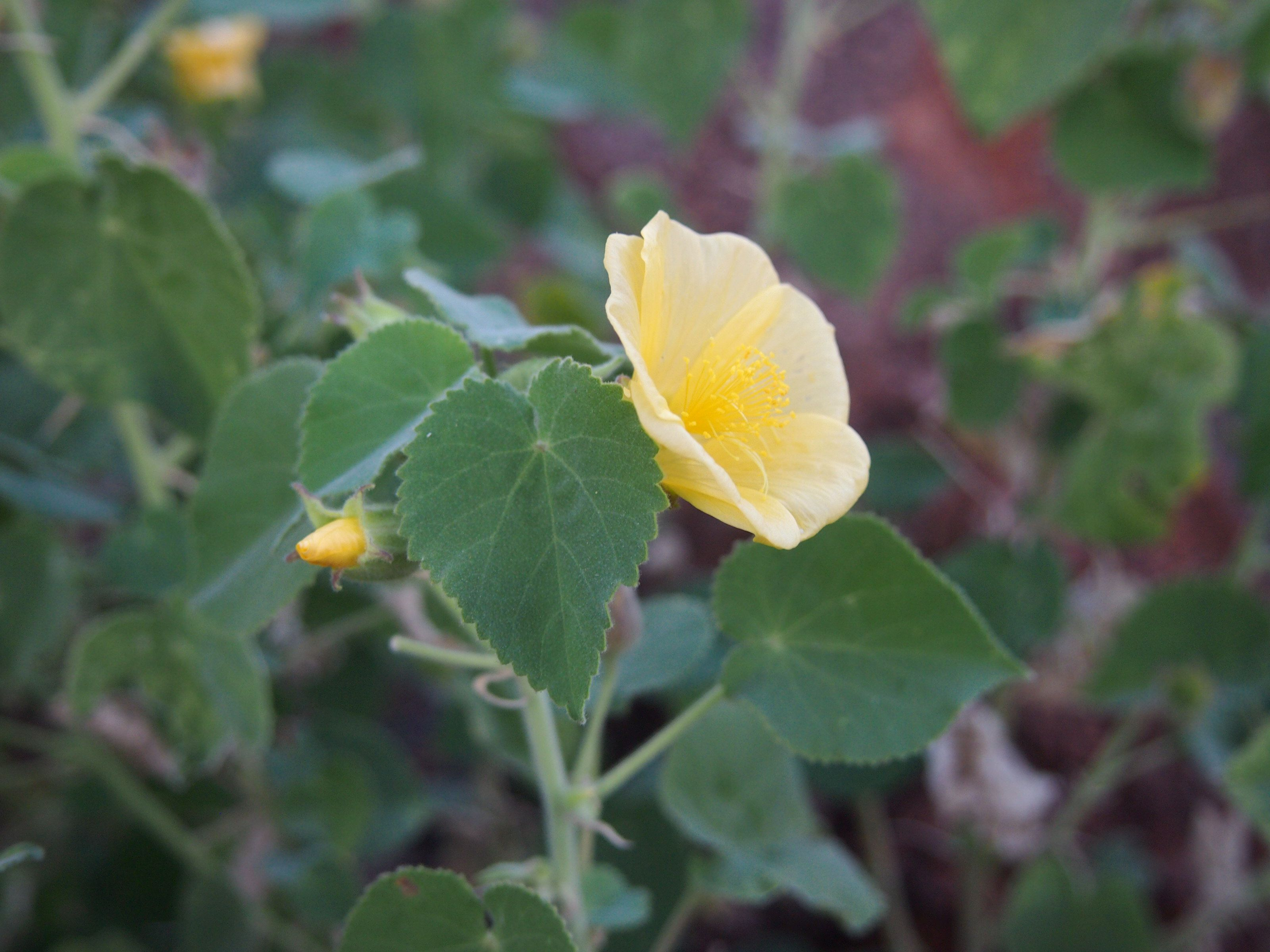

Scientific classification
- Kingdom: Plantae
- Clade: Tracheophytes
- Clade: Angiosperms
- Clade: Eudicots
- Clade: Rosids
- Order: Malvales
- Family: Malvaceae
- Genus: Abutilon
- Species: A. fraseri

Binomial name
- Abutilon fraseri (Hook.) Walp.

= Abutilon fraseri =

Dwarf lantern-flower

Species of mallow

Abutilon fraseri commonly known as dwarf lantern-flower, is a flowering plant in the family Malvaceae and is endemic to Australia. It is a small shrub with yellow flowers.

== Description ==
Abutilon fraseri is a small upright undershrub to 40 cm (16 in) high and covered with soft, short, star-shaped hairs and long simple hairs. The leaves are more or less circular to oval-shaped, 1.5–5 cm (0.59–1.97 in) long, heart-shaped at the base, margins roughly toothed, scalloped, rounded or almost pointed at the apex . The calyx about 7–8 mm (0.28–0.31 in) long, corolla yellow, 15 mm (0.59 in) long, lobes broadly lance-shaped and longer than the floral tube. Flowering occurs mostly in spring and summer and the usually 10 fruit are 7–8 mm (0.28–0.31 in) in diameter and 7 mm (0.28 in) long, green and containing 2 seeds.

== Taxonomy and naming ==
Abutilon fraseri was first formally described in 1851 by Wilhelm Gerhard Walpers from an unpublished description by William Jackson Hooker and the description was published in Annales Botanices Systematicae. The specific epithet (fraseri) is in honour of Malcolm Fraser.

== Distribution and habitat ==
Dwarf lantern-flower grows in rocky situations in Queensland, Victoria, Western Australia, South Australia and the Northern Territory.
