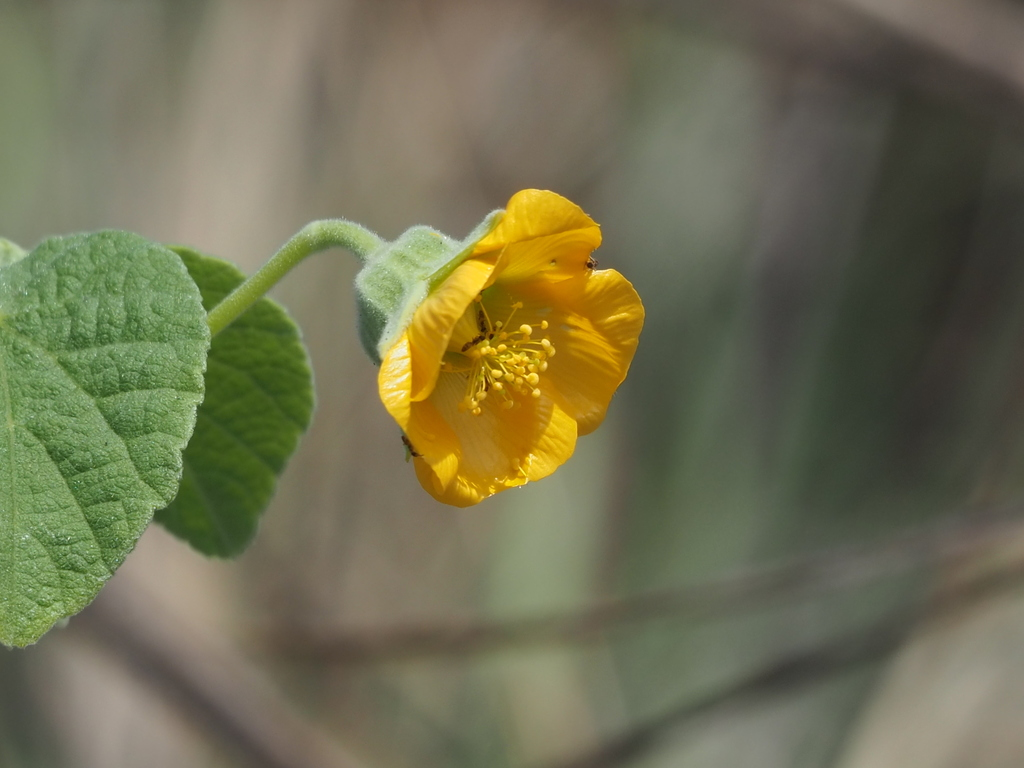

Scientific classification
- Kingdom: Plantae
- Clade: Tracheophytes
- Clade: Angiosperms
- Clade: Eudicots
- Clade: Rosids
- Order: Malvales
- Family: Malvaceae
- Genus: Abutilon
- Species: A. guineense

Binomial name
- Abutilon guineense (Schumach.) Baker f. & Exell,

Synonyms
- Sida guineensis Schumach.; Abutilon agnesiae Borzí; Abutilon asperifolium Ulbr.; Abutilon blepharocarpum Mattei; Abutilon densevillosum Mattei; Abutilon indicum var. guineense (Schumach.) K.M.Feng; Abutilon indicum subsp. guineense (Schumach.) Borss.Waalk.; Abutilon taiwanense S.Y.Hu

= Abutilon guineense =

Species of plant

Abutilon guineense is a species of flowering plant in the mallow family, Malvaceae. It has a broad distribution in Africa and has been introduced elsewhere. It may comprise more than one species, with others yet undescribed. In China it occurs in Hainan, Sichuan, and Yunnan.

Abutilon guineense was originally described by Heinrich Christian Friedrich Schumacher in 1829 as Sida guineensis. Two varieties are accepted:

- Abutilon guineense. var. guineense — calyx bell-shaped, petals approximately 18 mm (0.71 in) long, staminal column smooth
- Abutilon guineense var. forrestii (S.Y.Hu) Y.Tang — calyx disk-shaped, petals 6 mm (0.24 in) long, staminal column stellate-hairy
