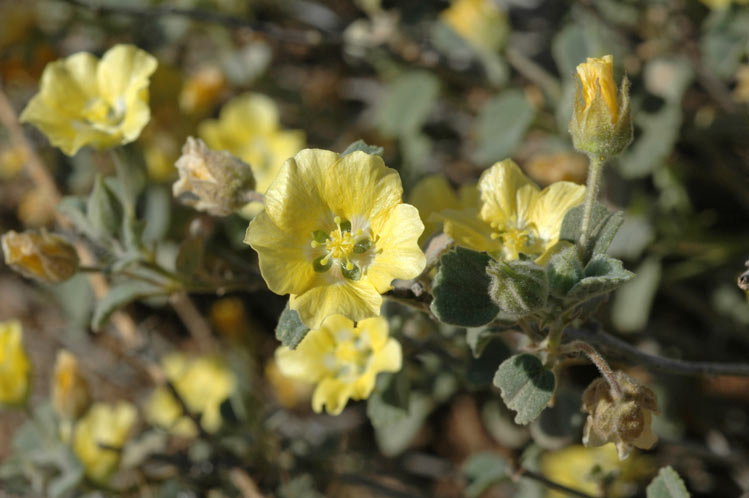

Scientific classification
- Kingdom: Plantae
- Clade: Tracheophytes
- Clade: Angiosperms
- Clade: Eudicots
- Clade: Rosids
- Order: Malvales
- Family: Malvaceae
- Genus: Abutilon
- Species: A. halophilum

Binomial name
- Abutilon halophilum F.Muell. ex Schltdl.

= Abutilon halophilum =

Species of mallow

Abutilon halophilum is a flowering plant in the family Malvaceae. It is a small understory shrub with yellow or cream-white flowers and hairy oval-shaped leaves and grows in New South Wales, South Australia and the Northern Territory.

== Description ==
Abutilon halophilum is a small, understory shrub to 50 cm (20 in) high and covered with soft, star-shaped hairs. The leaves are oval-circular shaped, 1–3 cm (0.39–1.18 in) long, apex rounded or notched and the margins widely toothed except near the base. The calyx about 7 mm (0.28 in) long, lobes broadly lance-shaped and the corolla 12–14 mm (0.47–0.55 in) long. Flowering occurs throughout the year and the fruit is 10–14 mm (0.39–0.55 in) in diameter, 8–10 mm (0.31–0.39 in) long, spreading, blunt and the mericarp with about 10 segments.

== Taxonomy and naming ==
Abutilon halophilum was first formally described by Diederich Franz Leonhard von Schlechtendal from an unpublished description by Ferdinand von Mueller and the description was published in Linnaea: ein Journal für die Botanik in ihrem ganzen Umfange, oder Beiträge zur Pflanzenkunde. The specific epithet is derived from the ancient Greek words hals, genitive halos (ἅλς, genitive ἁλός), meaning "salt" and philein (φιλεῖν), meaning "to love".

== Distribution and habitat ==
This species grows on rocky desert soil and heavy clay, sometimes near floodplains and mostly amongst salt bush in New South Wales, South Australia and the Northern Territory.
