= Abutilon × hybridum =

Species of flowering plant

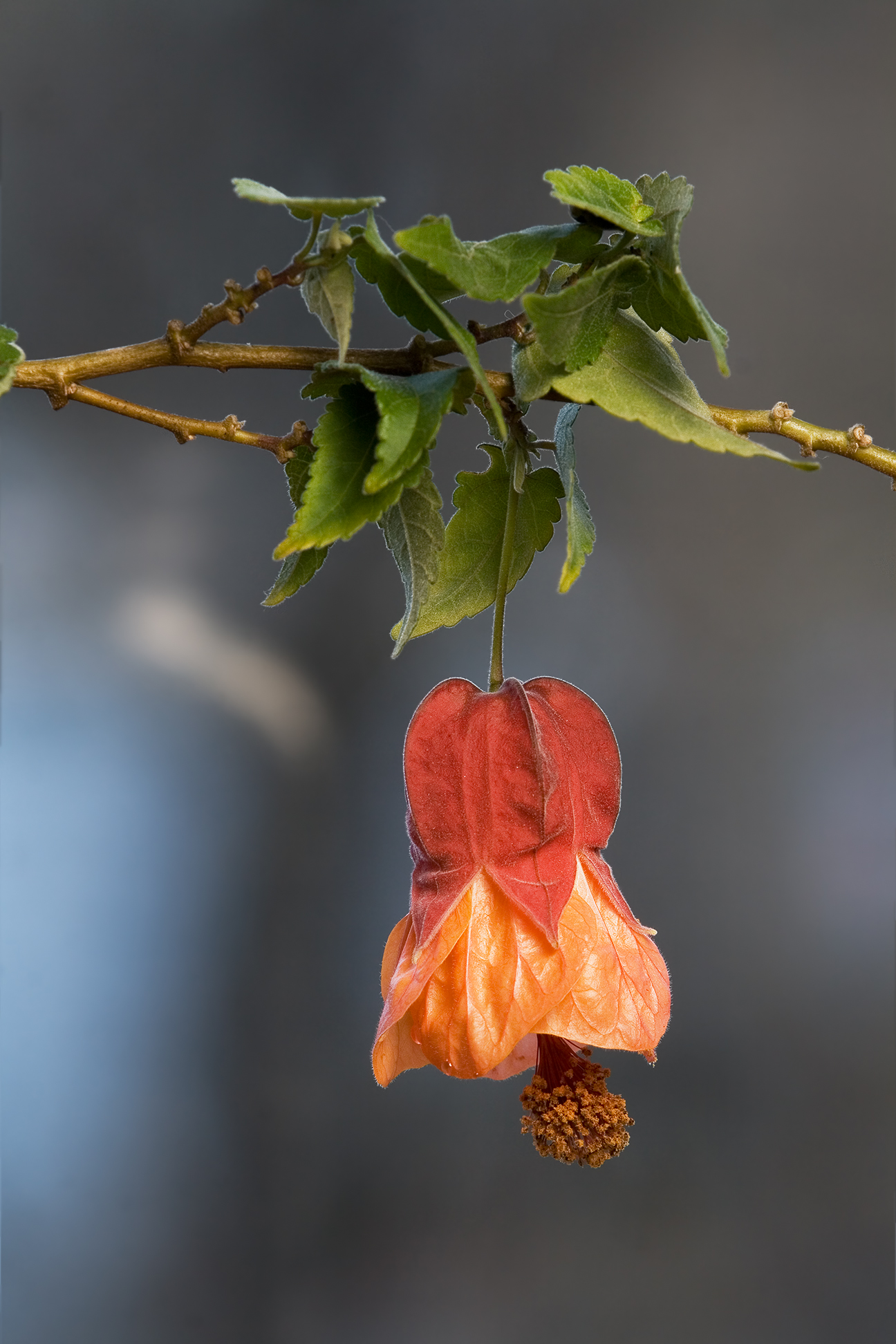
Abutilon × hybridum cultivar 'Patrick Synge'

Abutilon × hybridum is a species name used for a wide variety of different types of flowering plants of uncertain origin in the genus Abutilon. Because of the uncertainty surrounding the name, they are often considered a cultivar group: Abutilon x Hybridum Group or Abutilon Hybridum Group. They are cultigens, not occurring in the wild. As with the larger genus Abutilon generally, they have been referred to by the common names Chinese lantern, and parlour maple.

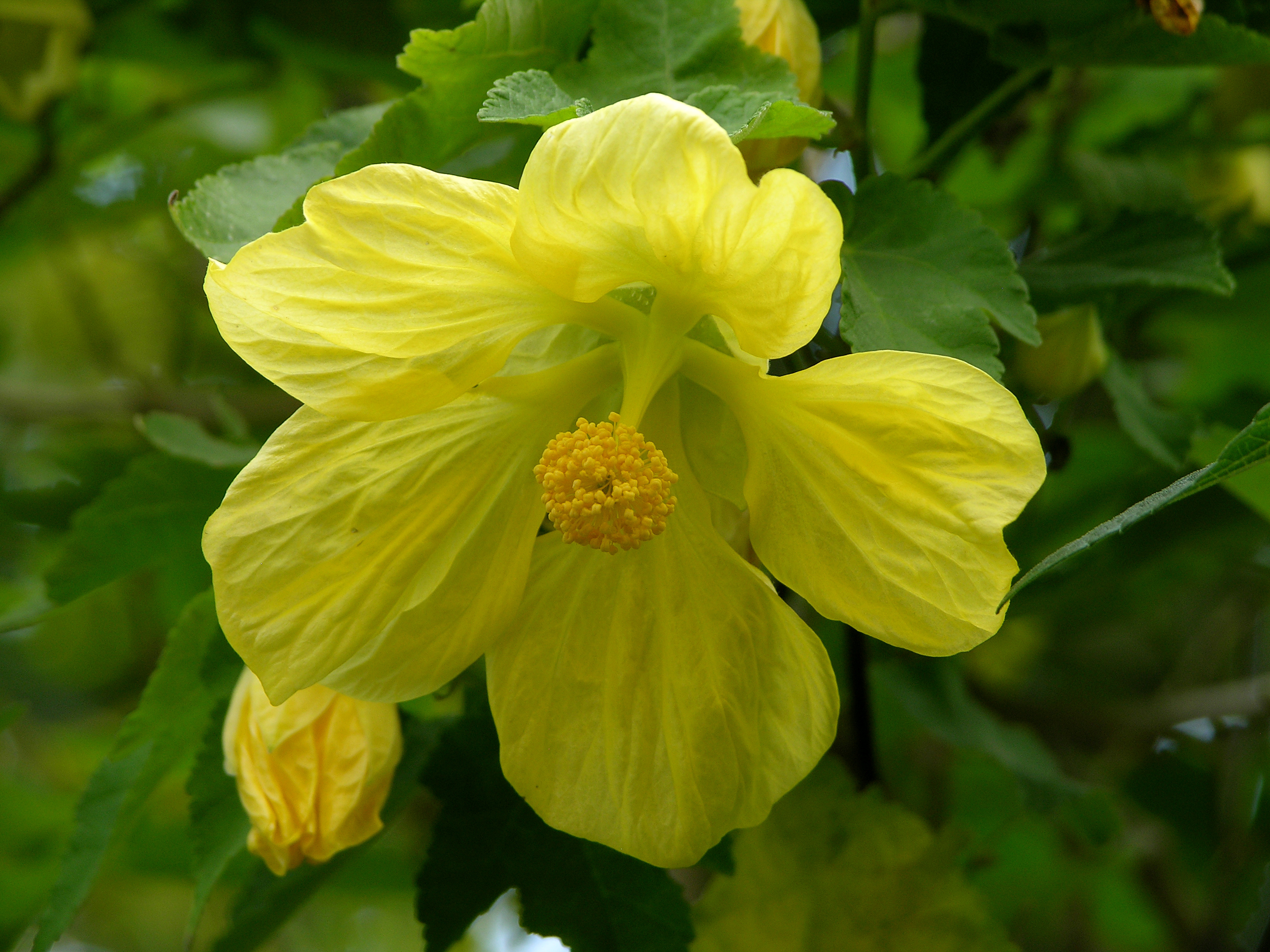
Cultivar 'Moonchimes'

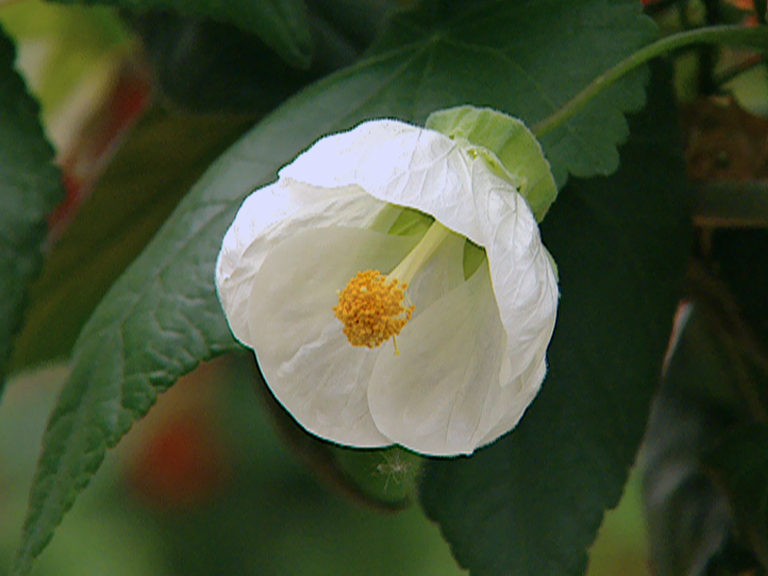

== Description ==
No reliable source has settled the question of parentage for these plants, and they have been variously said to perhaps derive from the species Abutilon theophrasti, A. striatum, A. darwinii, A. pictum, or any of the South American species.

Descriptions vary widely; some sources have described them as short as "1 to 2 ½' tall", while others list them as reaching 15' in height.
