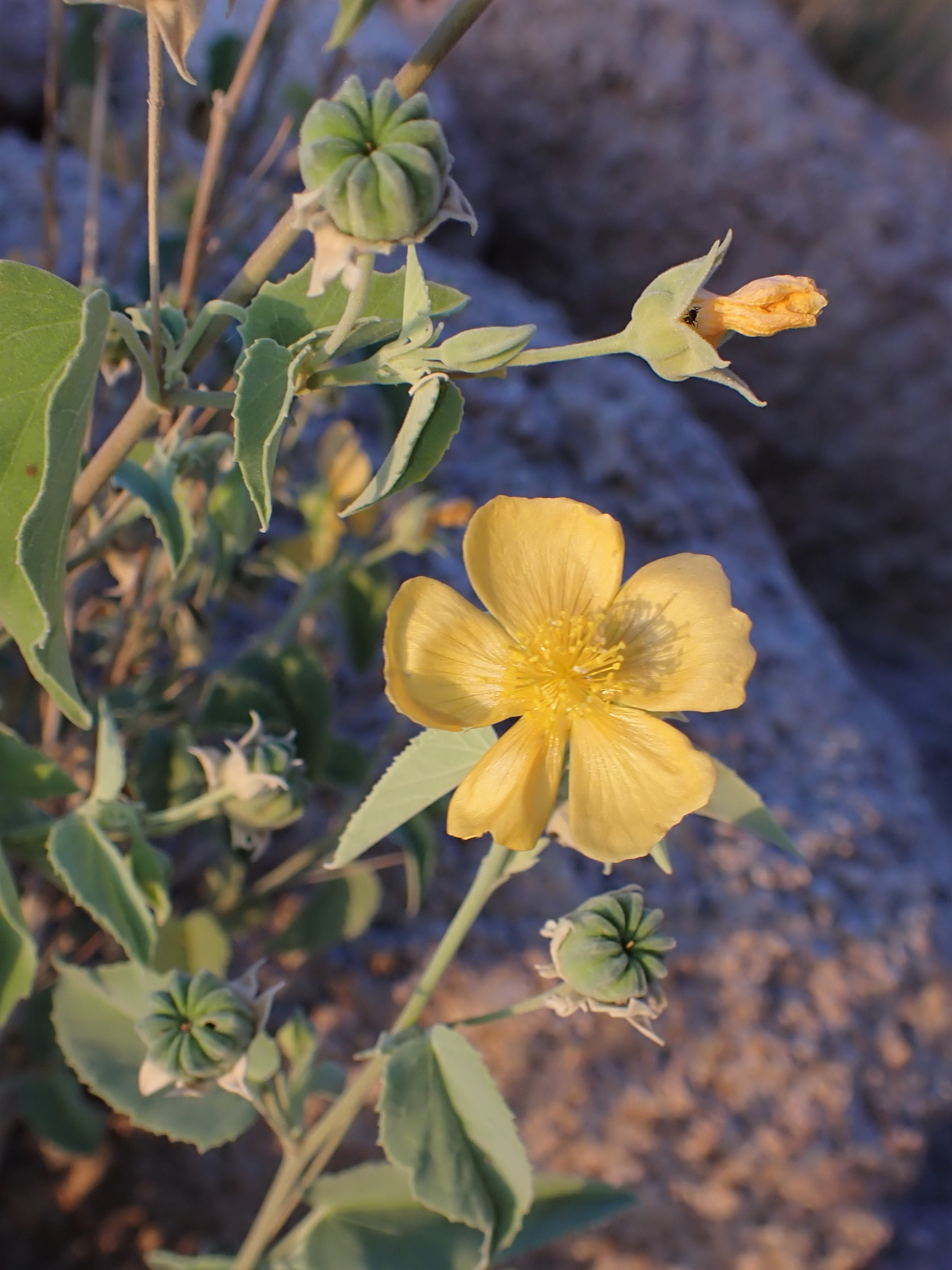
- Flowers and fruits

Conservation status
- Apparently Secure (NatureServe)

Scientific classification
- Kingdom: Plantae
- Clade: Tracheophytes
- Clade: Angiosperms
- Clade: Eudicots
- Clade: Rosids
- Order: Malvales
- Family: Malvaceae
- Genus: Abutilon
- Species: A. fruticosum

Binomial name
- Abutilon fruticosum Guill. & Perr. 1831

Synonyms
- List: Abutilon denticulatum (Fresen.) Webb; Abutilon dubium Mattei; Abutilon fruticosum var. chrysocarpum Blatt. & Hallb.; Abutilon fruticosum var. microphyllum (A.Rich.) Abedin; Abutilon fruticosum var. saidae Abedin; Abutilon microphyllum A.Rich.; Abutilon nuttallii Torr. & A.Gray; Abutilon texense Torr. & A.Gray; Sida amoena Wall.; Sida denticulata Fresen.; Sida gracilis R.Br.; Sida kotschyi Hochst. ex Mast.; Sida perrottetiana D. Dietr.

= Abutilon fruticosum =

Texas Indian mallow

Species of flowering plant

Abutilon fruticosum is a widespread species of flowering plant in the mallow family known by the common names Texas Indian mallow, pelotazo, and sweet Indian mallow.

== Description ==
The perennial herb grows up to 1.8 metres (6 ft) tall, but usually not exceeding 90 centimetres (35 in). The alternately arranged leaves are up to 10 cm (4 in) long. The blades are thick and coated in hairs, appearing gray. The yellow-orange flowers are up to about 2.5 cm (1 in) wide. Flowering occurs in June through October in Texas.

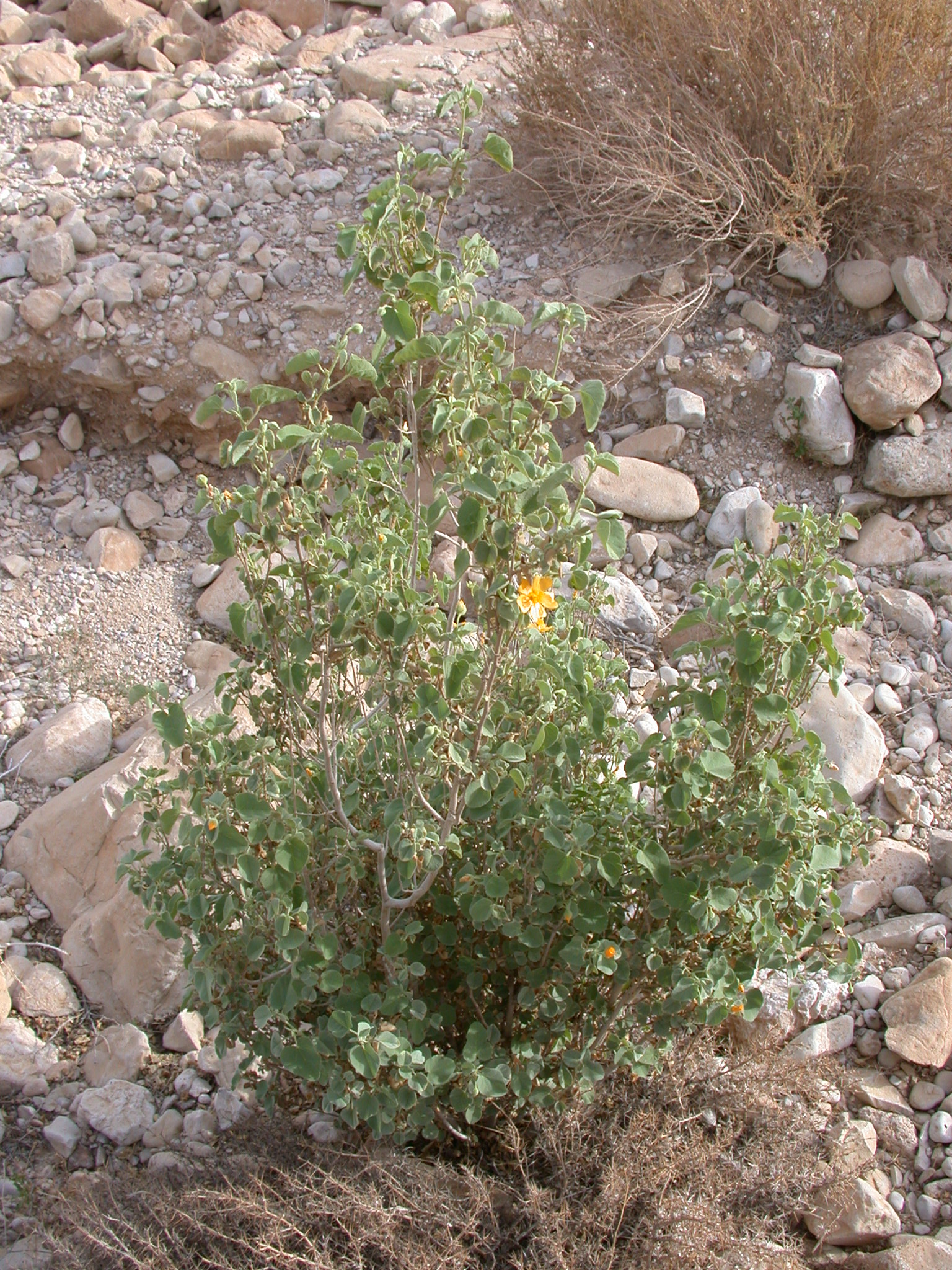
Shrub

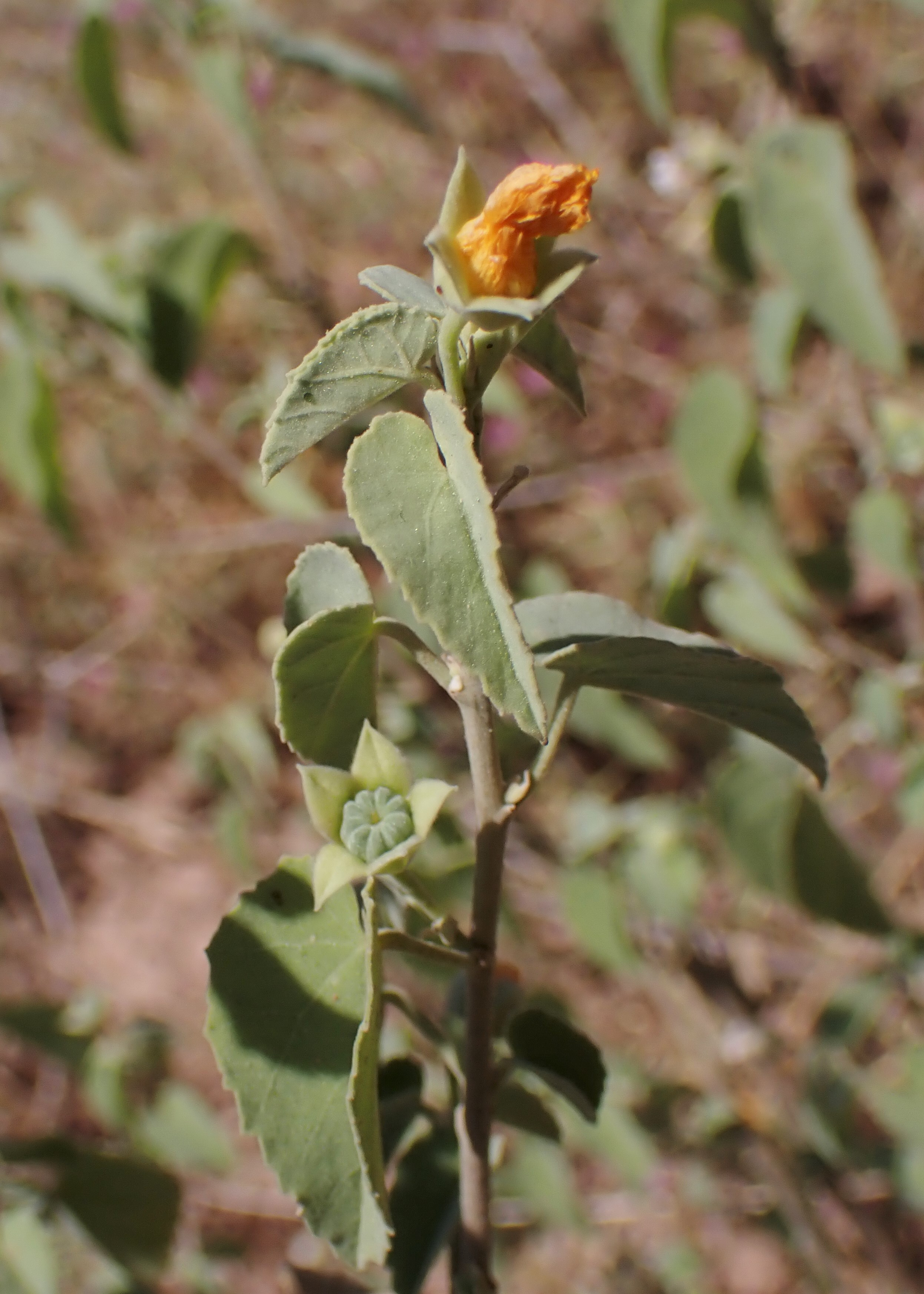
Foliage

== Distribution and habitat ==
The plant is native to Africa, southern and southwestern Asia (from Saudi Arabia to India), northern Mexico, and the south-central United States. It grows in chaparral and woodlands and on prairies. It grows on cliffs, slopes, and limestone outcrops.

== Ecology ==
It is eaten by wild and domesticated ungulates. The seeds provide food for birds such as the bobwhite quail. The flowers attract birds and butterflies. It is host to larvae of a number of butterfly species.

== Uses ==
The species is drought-tolerant and can be used in xeriscaping.
