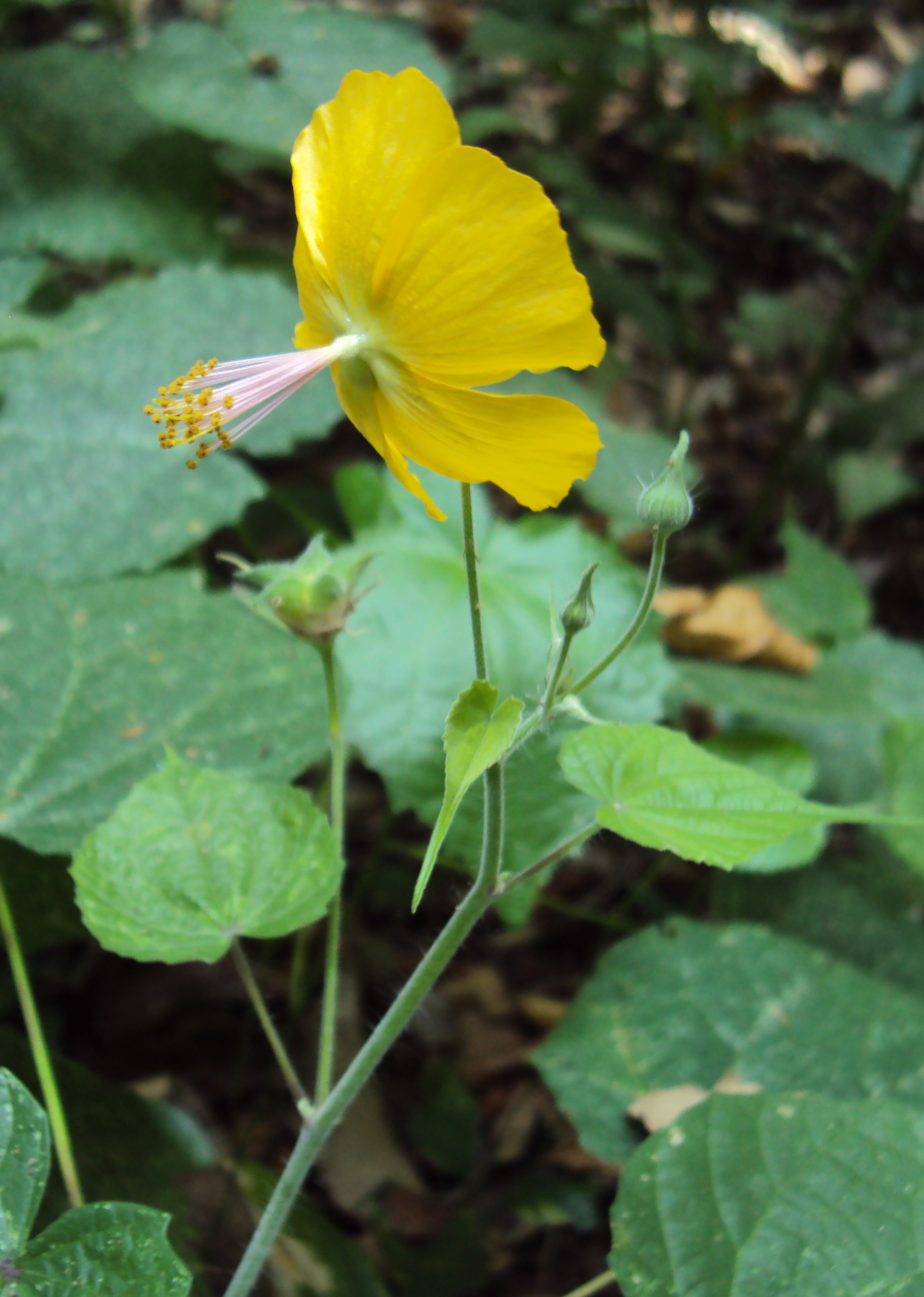

Scientific classification
- Kingdom: Plantae
- Clade: Tracheophytes
- Clade: Angiosperms
- Clade: Eudicots
- Clade: Rosids
- Order: Malvales
- Family: Malvaceae
- Genus: Abutilon
- Species: A. persicum

Binomial name
- Abutilon persicum (Burm.f.) Merr.

Synonyms
- Abutilon oxyphyllum C.Presl; Abutilon polyandrum (Roxb.) Wight & Arn.; Abutilon sundaicum (Blume) G.Don; Abutilon timoriense (DC.) G.Don; Sida heterotricha Zipp. ex Span.; Sida persica Burm.f.; Sida polyandra Roxb.; Sida sundaica Blume; Sida timoriensis DC.; Sida wallichii Steud.

= Abutilon persicum =

Species of shrub

Abutilon persicum is a large erect shrub, growing up to 1–2 m high. The stem yields a long and silky fibre which can be used to make rope. It prefers moist deciduous and semi-evergreen forests.
