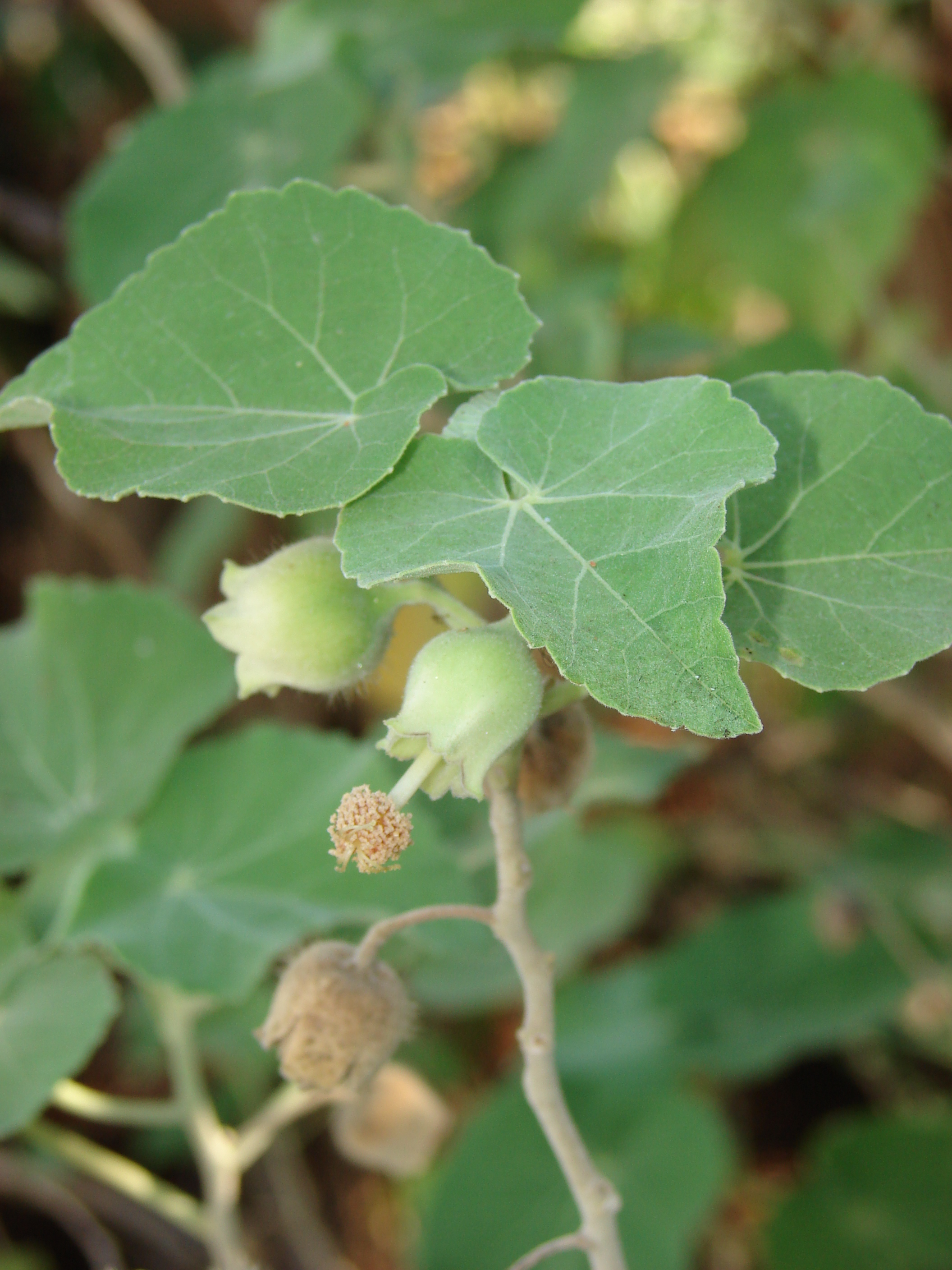

Conservation status
- Critically Endangered (IUCN 3.1)

Scientific classification
- Kingdom: Plantae
- Clade: Tracheophytes
- Clade: Angiosperms
- Clade: Eudicots
- Clade: Rosids
- Order: Malvales
- Family: Malvaceae
- Genus: Abutilon
- Species: A. eremitopetalum

Binomial name
- Abutilon eremitopetalum Caum
- It is endemic to the island Lānaʻi of Hawaii, US.

= Abutilon eremitopetalum =

Species of flowering plant

Abutilon eremitopetalum, commonly known as the hidden-petaled abutilon or hiddenpetal Indian mallow, is a species of flowering shrub in the mallow family, Malvaceae. It is endemic to dry forests and low shrublands on the windward side of the island of Lānaʻi in Hawaii. It is classified by the IUCN Red List as critically endangered by habitat destruction. The species was first discovered in 1987.
