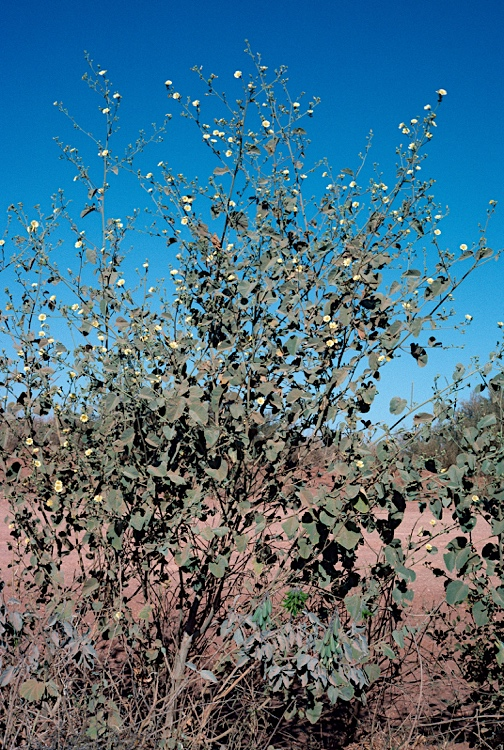

Scientific classification
- Kingdom: Plantae
- Clade: Tracheophytes
- Clade: Angiosperms
- Clade: Eudicots
- Clade: Rosids
- Order: Malvales
- Family: Malvaceae
- Genus: Abutilon
- Species: A. lepidum

Binomial name
- Abutilon lepidum (F.Muell.) A.S.Mitch.

Synonyms
- Sida lepida F.Muell.

= Abutilon lepidum =

Species of plant

Abutilon lepidum is a flowering plant in the family Malvaceae. It was first described in 1868 as Sida lepida by Ferdinand von Mueller, but was transferred to the genus, Abutilon, in 1980 by Andrew Stewart Mitchell. The species epithet, lepidum, comes from the Latin adjective, lepidus, which means pleasant, charming, or elegant.

It is native to Western Australia and the Northern Territory.

== Gallery ==
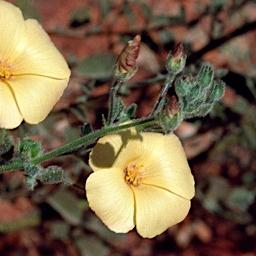

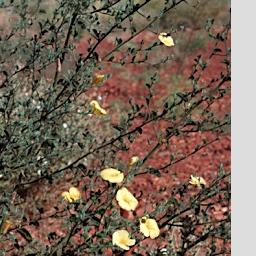
