= Abutilon hulseanum =

Scientific classification
- Kingdom: Plantae
- Clade: Tracheophytes
- Clade: Angiosperms
- Clade: Eudicots
- Clade: Rosids
- Order: Malvales
- Family: Malvaceae
- Genus: Abutilon
- Species: A. hulseanum

Binomial name
- Abutilon hulseanum (Torr. & A. Gray) Torr. ex Baker f.

Synonyms
- Abutilon commutatum K.Schum.; Abutilon leucophaeum Hochr.; Sida hulseana Torr. & A.Gray

Species of mallow in Florida

Abutilon hulseanum, the mauve or red Indian mallow, is a species of flowering plant in the family Malvaceae.

== Description ==
Abutilon hulseanum is a short-lived perennial shrub growing to 7 ft (2.1 m). Its showy orange-pink flowers bloom from late winter to early spring.

== Distribution ==
It is native to New Mexico, Texas, Florida, most of Mexico, Honduras, Cuba, Jamaica, Puerto Rico, the Leeward Islands, and the Windward Islands. In some contexts it is an invasive weedy plant, and adapts readily to disturbed habitats, such as old orange groves.
