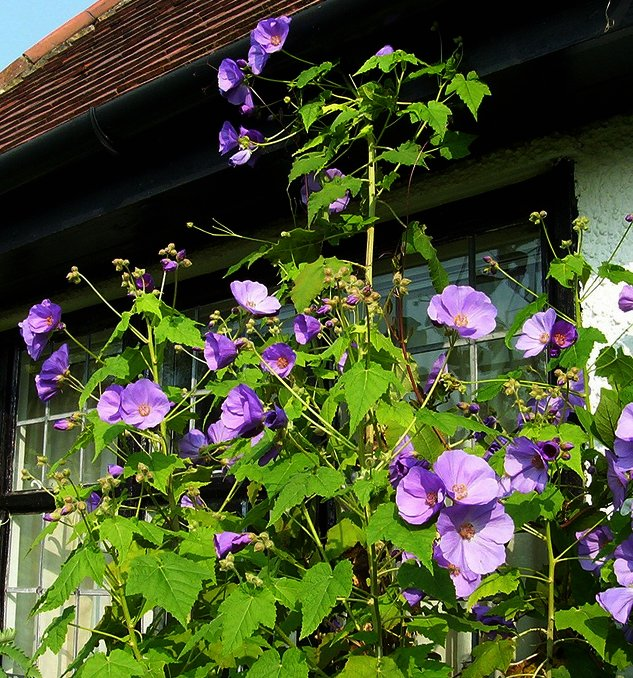

Scientific classification
- Kingdom: Plantae
- Clade: Tracheophytes
- Clade: Angiosperms
- Clade: Eudicots
- Clade: Rosids
- Order: Malvales
- Family: Malvaceae
- Genus: Corynabutilon
- Species: C. vitifolium

Binomial name
- Corynabutilon vitifolium (Cav.) Kearney

Synonyms
- List: Abutilon vitifolium (Cav.) G.Don; Sida vitifolia Cav.; Sidalcea triloba Turcz.

= Corynabutilon vitifolium =

Species of plant in the mallow family

Corynabutilon vitifolium (syn. Abutilon vitifolium) is a species of plant in the mallow family. Its native range is central and south-central Chile. Its cultivars 'Tennant's White' and 'Veronica Tennant' have gained the Royal Horticultural Society's Award of Garden Merit.
