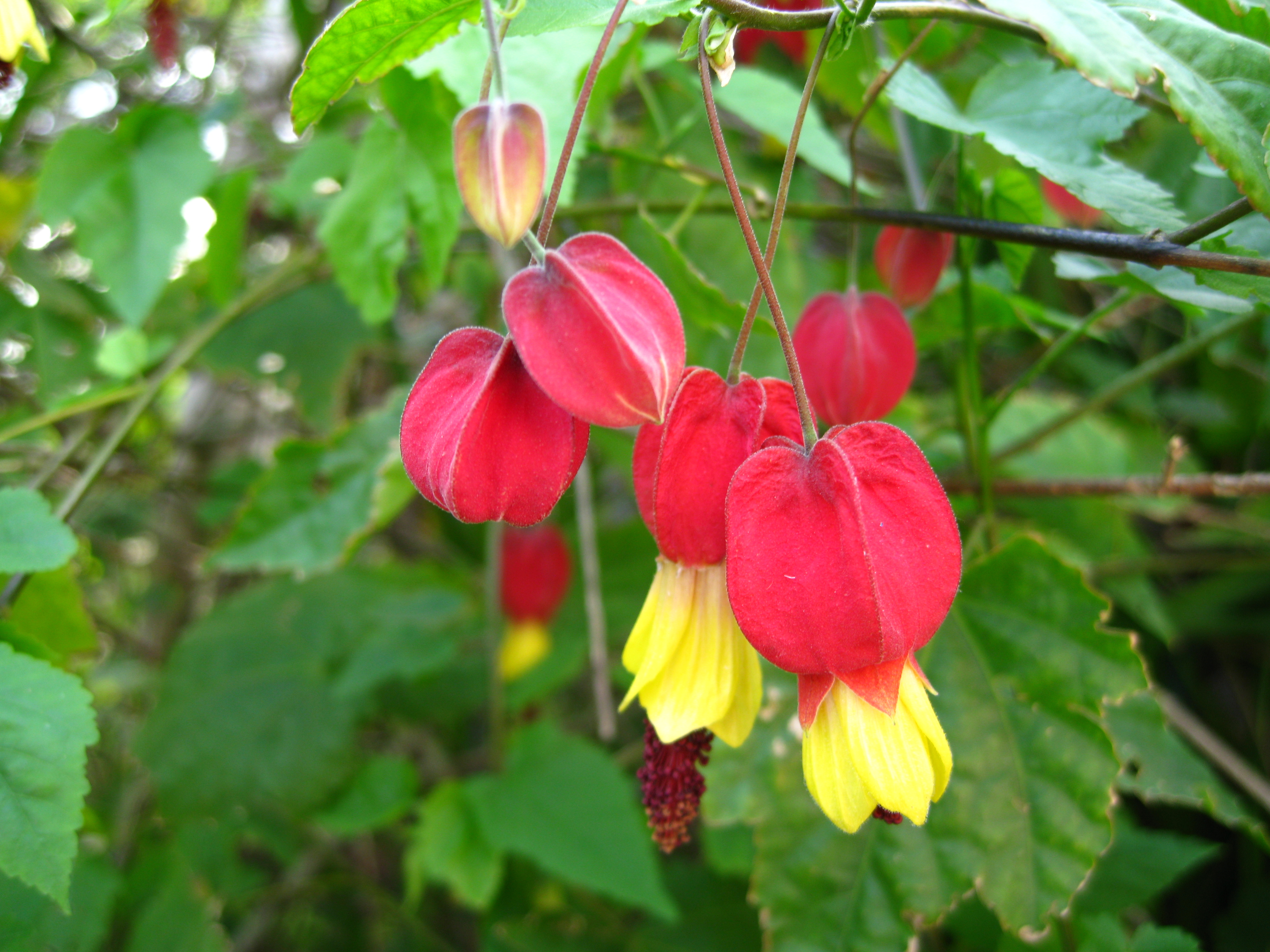

Scientific classification
- Kingdom: Plantae
- Clade: Tracheophytes
- Clade: Angiosperms
- Clade: Eudicots
- Clade: Rosids
- Order: Malvales
- Family: Malvaceae
- Genus: Abutilon
- Species: A. megapotamicum

Binomial name
- Abutilon megapotamicum (Spreng.) St. Hil. & Naudin.

= Abutilon megapotamicum =

Species of flowering plant

Abutilon megapotamicum or Callianthe megapotamica (trailing abutilon) is a species of Abutilon native to Argentina, Brazil and Uruguay. It is a shrub growing to 2.5 metres (8 ft 2 in) tall, with leaves 5–8 centimetres (2.0–3.1 in) long, ovate to shallowly three-lobed. The flowers are orange-yellow with a red base, with five petals about 4 centimetres (1.6 in) long.

It is a popular ornamental plant in subtropical gardens or temperate gardens that experience mild winters. They bloom for months from summer to frost, and they decorate the plant with a profusion of blossoms resembling Chinese lanterns. It has gained the Royal Horticultural Society's Award of Garden Merit.

They are also known as flowering maple, Chinese lantern and parlour maple, in addition to trailing abutilon.
