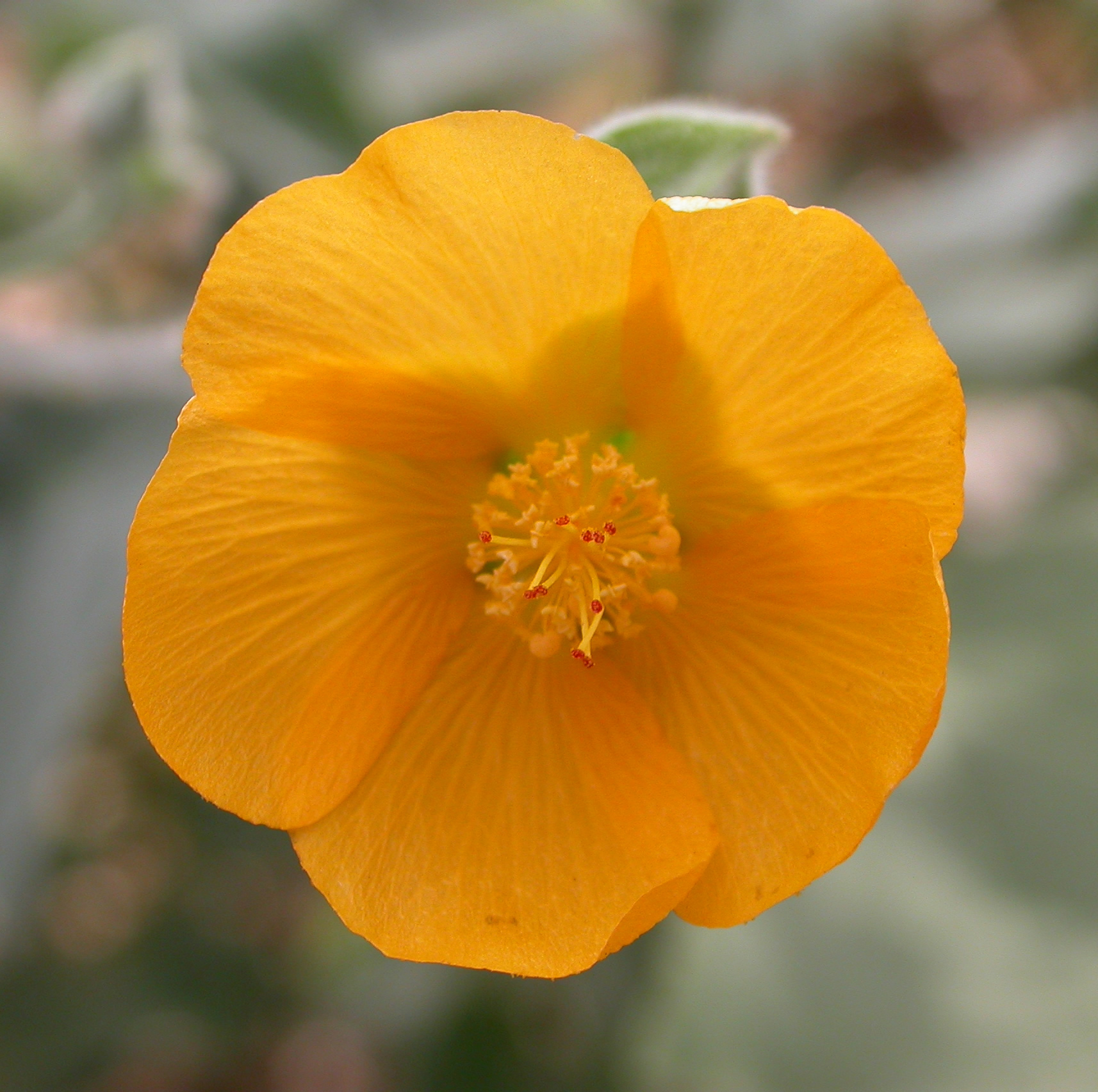

Conservation status
- Apparently Secure (NatureServe)

Scientific classification
- Kingdom: Plantae
- Clade: Tracheophytes
- Clade: Angiosperms
- Clade: Eudicots
- Clade: Rosids
- Order: Malvales
- Family: Malvaceae
- Genus: Abutilon
- Species: A. palmeri

Binomial name
- Abutilon palmeri Gray

= Abutilon palmeri =

Species of shrub

Abutilon palmeri, known as Palmer's abutilon, superstition mallow, and Palmer's Indian mallow is a species of flowering plant native the Southwestern United States and northwestern Mexico.

The plant is found in the Sonoran Desert in Arizona, and in Southern California in the Sonoran Colorado Desert and adjacent eastern foothill ecotones of the Peninsular Ranges.

== Description ==
Abutilon palmeri is a semi-evergreen shrub growing 3–8 feet (0.91–2.44 m) high by 2–5 feet (0.61–1.52 m) wide. The branch and stem coloration is green to reddish brown and pubescent.

The alternate leaves are velvety and heart-shaped (nearly round to cordate). The leaves are serrate and densely woolly, giving a bluish, grey-green cast to the foliage.

The cup-shaped flowers are yellow to orange with 5 petals and approximately 1 inch (2.5 cm) in size. It blooms for most of the year.

The plant produces small, capsular fruits approximately 0.5 inches (1.3 cm) in diameter each. The fruit is multi-parted and covered with silky pubescence similar to the foliage.

== Cultivation ==
Abutilon palmeri is cultivated as an ornamental plant by specialty nurseries for planting in native plant, xeriscape, wildlife gardens, and in natural landscaping projects in warm climates.
