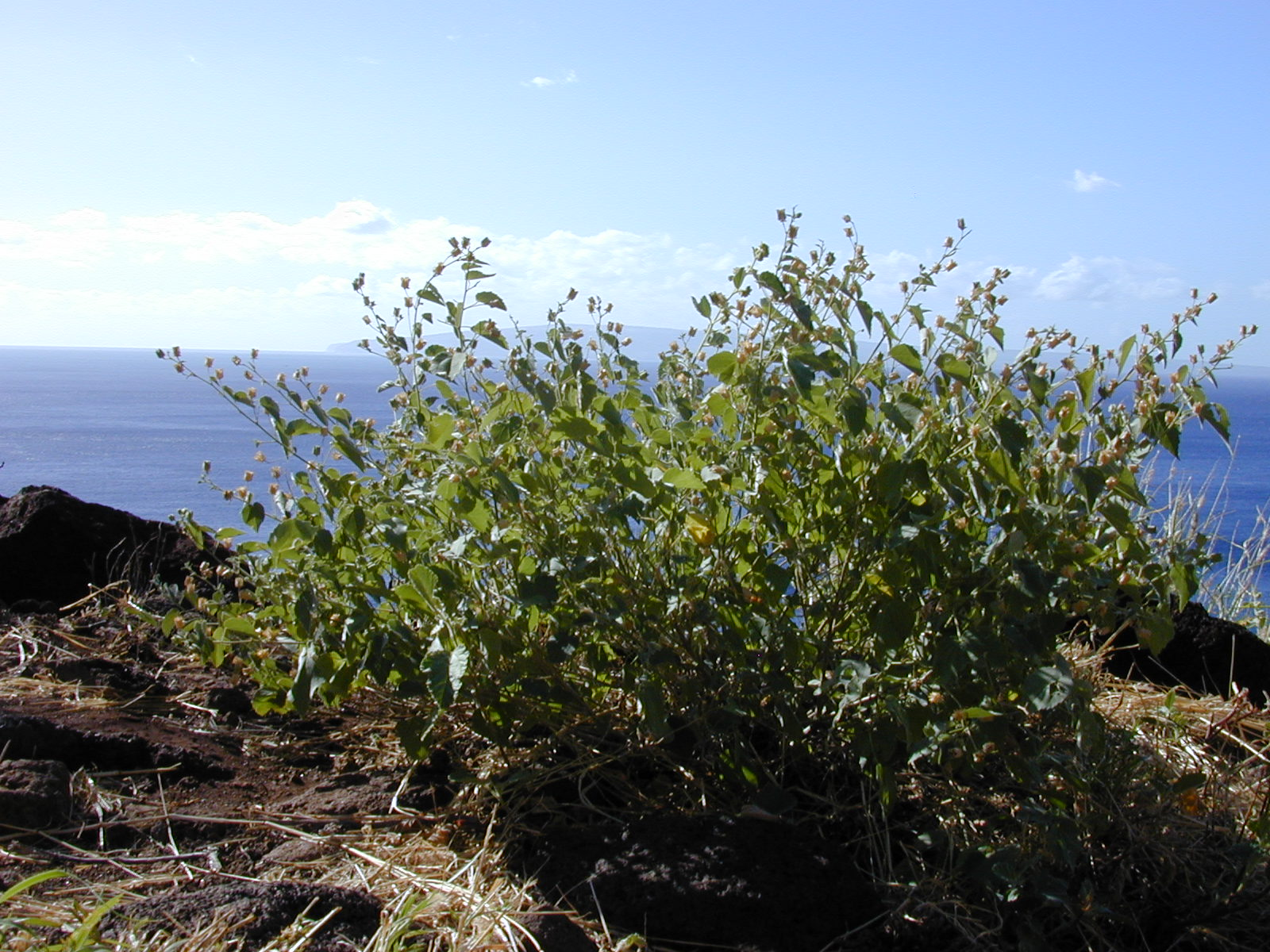

Conservation status
- Least Concern (IUCN 3.1)

- Secure (NatureServe)

Scientific classification
- Kingdom: Plantae
- Clade: Tracheophytes
- Clade: Angiosperms
- Clade: Eudicots
- Clade: Rosids
- Order: Malvales
- Family: Malvaceae
- Genus: Abutilon
- Species: A. incanum

Binomial name
- Abutilon incanum (Link) Sweet

Synonyms
- List: Abutilon incanum G.Don ex J.M.Coult.; Abutilon incanum subsp. pringlei (Hochr.) Felger & C.H.Lowe; Abutilon mochisense Hochr.; Abutilon pringlei Hochr.; Abutilon pringlei var. sinaloense Hochr.; Sida incana Link

= Abutilon incanum =

Species of flowering plant

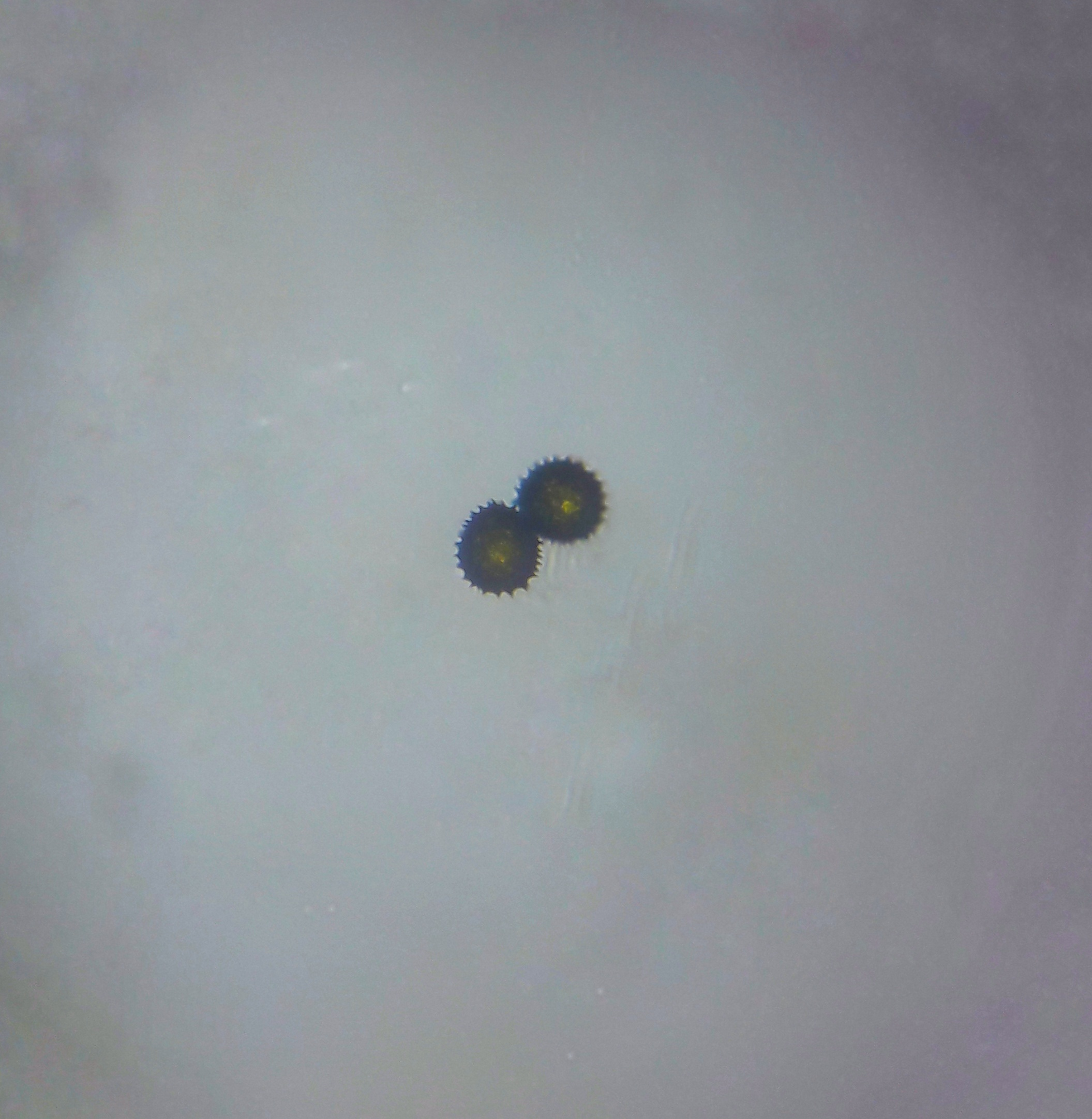
Pollen grain of Abutilon incanum

Abutilon incanum, also known as hoary abutilon, pelotazo, pelotazo chico, tronadora, and maʻo (Hawaiʻi), is a shrub widespread throughout the arid, warm regions of the southwestern United States and northern Mexico as well as Hawaiʻi.

It grows to between 0.5–2 metres (1.6–6.6 ft) in height; the leaves are ovate to lance-ovate in shape, with crenate margins, and sizes ranging from 0.5–3 centimetres (0.20–1.18 in) in width and 1.5–6 centimetres (0.59–2.36 in) in length. The solitary 5-petaled flowers are generally orange; in ssp. incanum they are 6–10 millimetres (0.24–0.39 in) long and orange-yellow, while in ssp. pringlei they are just 4–6 millimetres (0.16–0.24 in) and a deep orange with maroon spots. The 5–8-millimetre (0.20–0.31 in) fruits are capsules with 4–6 cells.

It favors rocky slopes and gravelly flats, and occurs in arroyos, at elevations up to 1,370 metres (4,490 ft). Requiring warm-season rain and mild winters, it is found in the Sonoran Desert, but not the Mojave Desert. In Hawaiʻi, maʻo can be found growing in dry forests and low shrublands at elevations from sea level to 220 metres (720 ft).
