= List of Sida species =

The following species in the flowering plant genus Sida, the fanpetals or sidas, are accepted by Plants of the World Online. Sida has historically been a wastebasket taxon, including many plants that simply did not fit into other genera of the Malvaceae. Species have been continually reclassified.

== Species ==
- Sida abutifolia Mill.
- Sida acuta Burm.f.
- Sida adscendens A.St.-Hil.
- Sida aggregata C.Presl
- Sida alamosana S.Watson ex Rose
- Sida alba L.
- Sida albiflora (Chodat & Hassl.) Krapov.
- Sida alii Abedin
- Sida ammophila F.Muell. ex J.H.Willis
- Sida andersonii Fryxell
- Sida angustifolia Mill.
- Sida angustissima A.St.-Hil.
- Sida anodifolia Fryxell
- Sida anomala A.St.-Hil.
- Sida antillensis Urb.
- Sida aprica Domin
- Sida arboae Krapov.
- Sida arenicola S.T.Reynolds & A.E.Holland
- Sida argentea F.M.Bailey
- Sida argentina K.Schum.
- Sida argillacea A.E.Holland & S.T.Reynolds
- Sida arsiniata R.M.Barker
- Sida asterocalyx S.T.Reynolds & A.E.Holland
- Sida atherophora Domin
- Sida aurantiaca A.St.-Hil.
- Sida bakeriana Rusby
- Sida barclayi Baker f.
- Sida beckii Krapov.
- Sida bipartita Schltr.
- Sida blepharoprion Ulbr.
- Sida boliviana Gand.
- Sida bordasiana Krapov.
- Sida brachypoda A.E.Holland & S.T.Reynolds
- Sida brachystemon DC.
- Sida brittonii León
- Sida brownii Clement
- Sida cabraliana Krapov.
- Sida cabreriana Krapov.
- Sida calchaquiensis Rodrigo
- Sida calliantha Thulin
- Sida calva Fryxell
- Sida calyxhymenia J.Gay ex DC.
- Sida cambuiensis Monteiro
- Sida cardiophylla F.Muell.
- Sida carrascoana Bovini
- Sida castanocarpa Krapov.
- Sida caudata A.St.-Hil. & Naudin
- Sida cavernicola Krapov.
- Sida centuriata Clement
- Sida cerradoensis Krapov.
- Sida chapadensis K.Schum.
- Sida charpinii Krapov.
- Sida chinensis Retz.
- Sida chiquitana Krapov.
- Sida chrysantha Ulbr.
- Sida ciliaris L.
- Sida cleisocalyx F.Muell.
- Sida clementii Domin
- Sida confusa Hassl.
- Sida coradinii Krapov.
- Sida cordata (Burm.f.) Borss.Waalk.
- Sida cordifolia L.
- Sida cordifolioides K.M.Feng
- Sida corrugata Lindl.
- Sida coutinhoi Paiva & Noguiera
- Sida cristobaliana Krapov.
- Sida cuneifolia Roxb.
- Sida cuspidata (A.Robyns) Krapov.
- Sida decandra R.E.Fr.
- Sida dubia A.St.-Hil. & Naudin
- Sida dureana Krapov.
- Sida echinocarpa F.Muell.
- Sida ectogama W.R.Barker & R.M.Barker
- Sida elliottii Torr. & A.Gray
- Sida elongata Blume
- Sida emilei Hochr.
- Sida esperanzae R.E.Fr.
- Sida everistiana S.T.Reynolds & A.E.Holland
- Sida fallax Walp.
- Sida fastuosa Fryxell & S.D.Koch
- Sida ferrucciana Krapov.
- Sida fibulifera Lindl.
- Sida floccosa Thulin & Vollesen
- Sida galheirensis Ulbr.
- Sida gertiana Krapov.
- Sida glabra Mill.
- Sida glaziovii K.Schum.
- Sida glocimarii Krapov.
- Sida glomerata Cav.
- Sida glutinosa Comm. ex Cav.
- Sida goniocarpa (F.Muell. ex Benth.) Domin
- Sida goyazensis K.Schum.
- Sida gracilipes Rusby
- Sida gracillima Hassl.
- Sida graniticola J.R.I.Wood
- Sida grazielae Monteiro
- Sida hackettiana W.Fitzg.
- Sida haenkeana C.Presl
- Sida harleyi Krapov.
- Sida hassleri Hochr.
- Sida hatschbachii Krapov.
- Sida hederifolia Cav.
- Sida hemitropousa Pandeya
- Sida hibisciformis Bertol.
- Sida hirsutissima Mill.
- Sida hoepfneri Gürke
- Sida honoriana Krapov.
- Sida hookeriana Miq.
- Sida hyalina Fryxell
- Sida hyssopifolia C.Presl
- Sida intricata F.Muell.
- Sida itaparicana Krapov.
- Sida jamaicensis L.
- Sida japiana Krapov.
- Sida jatrophoides L'Hér.
- Sida javensis Cav.
- Sida jussiaeana DC.
- Sida kingii F.Muell.
- Sida laciniata Bovini
- Sida lancifolia Burtt Davy
- Sida leitaofilhoi Krapov.
- Sida libenii Hauman
- Sida lilianae Krapov.
- Sida limensis R.E.Fr.
- Sida lindheimeri Engelm. & A.Gray
- Sida linearifolia A.St.-Hil.
- Sida linearis Cav.
- Sida linifolia Juss. ex Cav.
- Sida littoralis Siedo
- Sida lonchitis A.St.-Hil. & Naudin
- Sida longipedicellata Thulin
- Sida longipes A.Gray
- Sida luschnathiana Steud.
- Sida macaibae Monteiro
- Sida macropetala Monteiro
- Sida magnifica Domin
- Sida marabaensis Monteiro
- Sida martiana A.St.-Hil.
- Sida massaica Vollesen
- Sida meloana Krapov.
- Sida meridiana Fryxell
- Sida michoacana Fryxell
- Sida monteiroi Krapov.
- Sida monticola Fryxell
- Sida multicrena Hochr.
- Sida mysorensis Wight & Arn.
- Sida nemorensis Mart. ex Colla
- Sida neomexicana A.Gray
- Sida nesogena I.M.Johnst.
- Sida nummularia Baker f.
- Sida oblonga Bovini
- Sida ogadensis Thulin & Vollesen
- Sida oligandra K.Schum.
- Sida orientalis Cav.
- Sida ovalis Kostel.
- Sida ovata Forssk.
- Sida palmata Cav.
- Sida paradoxa Rodrigo
- Sida parva Krapov.
- Sida paucifolia DC.
- Sida pedersenii Krapov.
- Sida pedunculata (A.Cunn. ex J.M.Black) J.M.Black
- Sida pernambucensis Baracho & J.L.Brandão
- Sida petrophila F.Muell.
- Sida petropolitana Monteiro
- Sida phaeotricha F.Muell.
- Sida picklesiana A.S.Markey, S.J.Dillon & R.M.Barker
- Sida pindapoyensis Krapov.
- Sida pires-blackii Monteiro
- Sida planicaulis Cav.
- Sida platycalyx F.Muell. ex Benth.
- Sida pleiantha F.Muell. ex Benth.
- Sida poeppigiana (K.Schum.) Fryxell
- Sida potentilloides A.St.-Hil.
- Sida potosina Brandegee
- Sida pradeepiana Tambde & Sardesai
- Sida pritzeliana Domin
- Sida prolifica Fryxell & S.D.Koch
- Sida pseudocordifolia Hochr.
- Sida pseudocymbalaria Hassl.
- Sida pseudopotentilloides Monteiro
- Sida pseudorubifolia Krapov.
- Sida pueblensis Fryxell
- Sida pusilla Cav.
- Sida quettensis I.Riedl
- Sida quinquevalvacea J.L.Liu
- Sida ravii Sivad. & Anil Kumar
- Sida regnellii R.E.Fr.
- Sida reitzii Krapov.
- Sida repens Dombey ex Cav.
- Sida rhizomatosa Krapov.
- Sida rhombifolia L.
- Sida riedelii K.Schum.
- Sida rigida (G.Don) D.Dietr.
- Sida rivulicola Ulbr.
- Sida rodrigoi Monteiro
- Sida rohlenae Domin
- Sida rubifolia A.St.-Hil.
- Sida rubromarginata Nash
- Sida rufescens A.St.-Hil.
- Sida ruizii Ulbr.
- Sida rupicola Hassl.
- Sida rzedowskii Fryxell
- Sida salviifolia C.Presl
- Sida samoensis Rech.
- Sida sampaiana Monteiro
- Sida sangana Ulbr.
- Sida santaremensis Monteiro
- Sida schimperiana Hochst. ex A.Rich.
- Sida schininii Krapov.
- Sida schumanniana Krapov.
- Sida serrata Willd. ex Spreng.
- Sida setosa Mart. ex Colla
- Sida shinyangensis Vollesen
- Sida simpsonii Krapov.
- Sida sivarajanii Tambde, Sardesai & A.K.Pandey
- Sida spenceriana F.Muell.
- Sida spinosa L.
- Sida subcordata Span.
- Sida subcuneata A.St.-Hil.
- Sida sucupirana Krapov.
- Sida surumuensis Ulbr.
- Sida szechuensis Matsuda
- Sida tanaensis Vollesen
- Sida tenuicarpa Vollesen
- Sida teresinensis Krapov.
- Sida ternata L.f.
- Sida teysmannii Baker f.
- Sida tiagii Bhandari
- Sida tobatiensis Ulbr.
- Sida tragiifolia A.Gray
- Sida tressensiae Krapov.
- Sida trichopoda F.Muell.
- Sida tuberculata R.E.Fr.
- Sida turneroides Standl.
- Sida uchoae Monteiro
- Sida ulei Ulbr.
- Sida ulmifolia Mill.
- Sida uniaristata Gonçalez & V.N.Yoshik.
- Sida urens L.
- Sida vagans Krapov.
- Sida vallsii Krapov.
- Sida variegata (Griseb.) Krapov.
- Sida vespertina Ekman
- Sida viarum A.St.-Hil.
- Sida waltoniana Krapov.
- Sida weberbaueri Ulbr.
- Sida wingfieldii (Fryxell) Dorr
- Sida xanti A.Gray
- Sida yungasensis Krapov.
- Sida yunnanensis S.Y.Hu
- Sida zahlbruckneri Rech.
