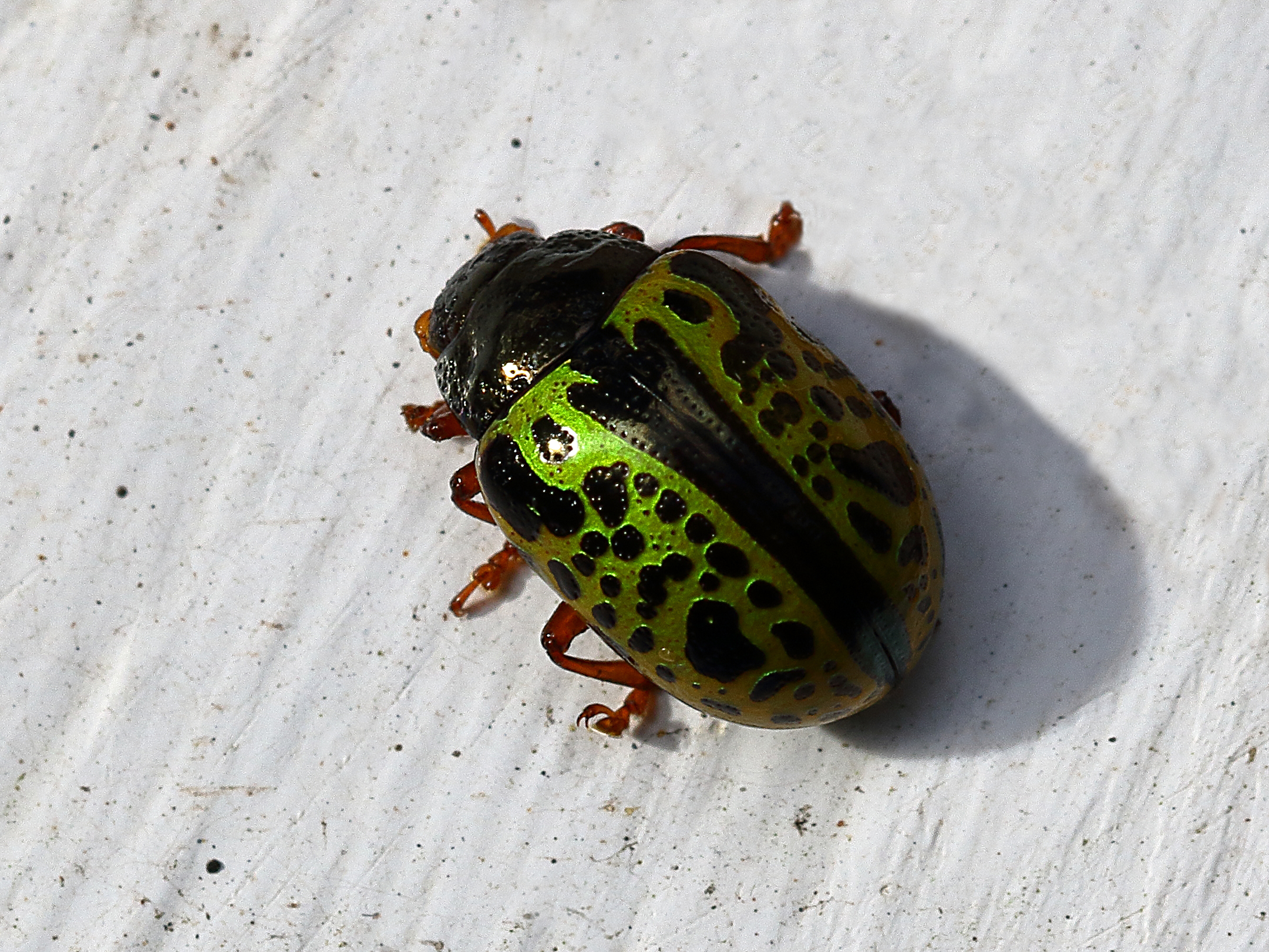
- Cairns, Australia 2018

Scientific classification
- Kingdom: Animalia
- Phylum: Arthropoda
- Clade: Pancrustacea
- Class: Insecta
- Order: Coleoptera
- Suborder: Polyphaga
- Infraorder: Cucujiformia
- Family: Chrysomelidae
- Genus: Calligrapha
- Species: C. pantherina

Binomial name
- Calligrapha pantherina Stål, 1859

= Calligrapha pantherina =

Species of beetle

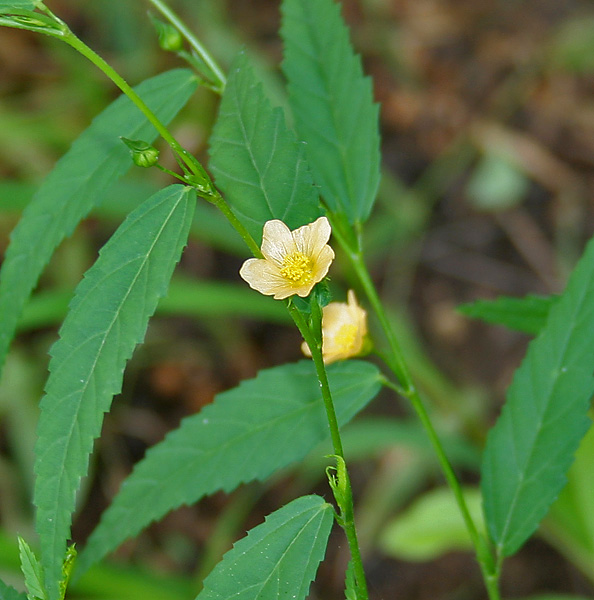
Sida acuta

Calligrapha pantherina, the sida leafbeetle, is a species of beetle in the family Chrysomelidae, endemic to Mexico. The larvae and adult beetles feed on the foliage of the common wireweed (Sida acuta) and the arrowleaf sida (Sida rhombifolia). This beetle has been introduced into Northern Australia as a biological control agent in an attempt to control its host plants, which are invasive weeds there.

== Distribution ==
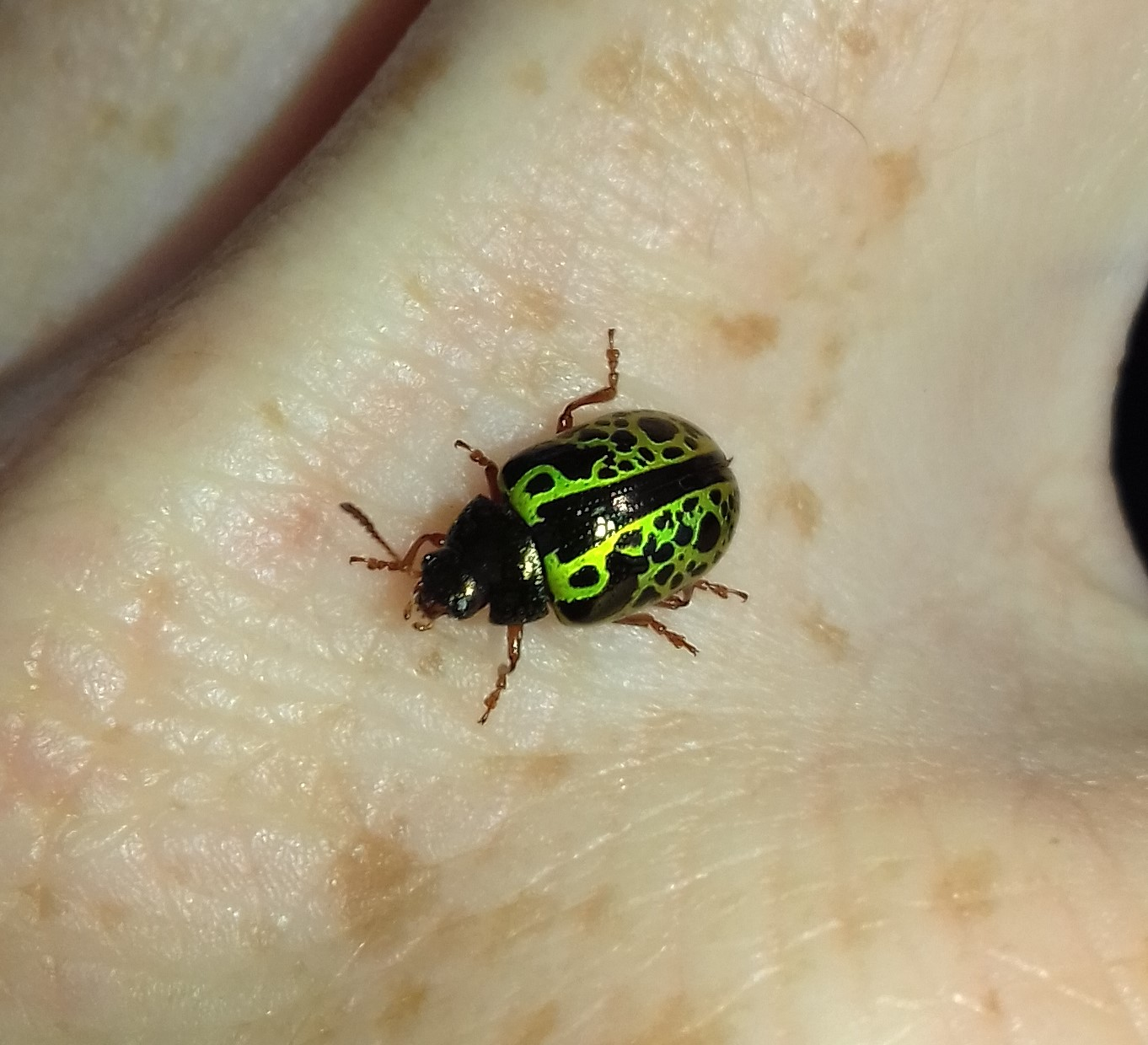
Calligrapha pantherina, Bourail, New Caledonia, 2020

In its native Mexico, this beetle is only found in the states of Guerrero, Oaxaca, Veracruz and Chiapas. In 1989, after extensive assessment, it was released into Northern Territory Australia. Following its success in that country, it was released in 1999 into Papua New Guinea, and also later into Fiji and Vanuatu. In 2016, the beetle was found to have reached New Caledonia. This caused some concern because, although there is invasive Sida acuta on the island, there are also two endemic species of Sida.

== Ecology ==
Sida acuta is a small shrub that is native to Mexico but has spread to many other tropical countries. In its native land, Calligrapha pantherina has a restricted host range and feeds only on Sida acuta and the closely related Sida rhombifolia and Sida spinosa. Eggs are laid on the underside of older leaves. The larvae feed on the foliage, aggregating together for the first three instar stages and feeding separately during the fourth (last) instar. The larger larvae may also consume the flowers and fruits. When fully fed, the larvae descend to the ground, pupating among the leaf litter or buried in fine soil. The total development time from egg to adult is about 24 days.
