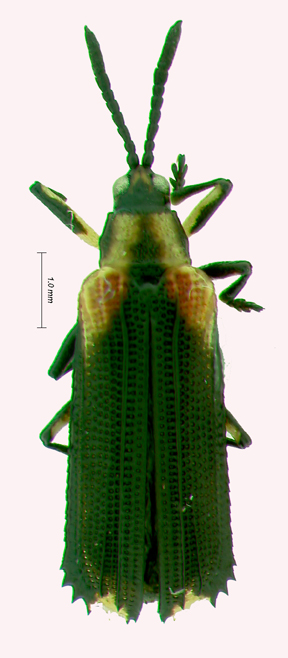

Scientific classification
- Kingdom: Animalia
- Phylum: Arthropoda
- Clade: Pancrustacea
- Class: Insecta
- Order: Coleoptera
- Suborder: Polyphaga
- Infraorder: Cucujiformia
- Family: Chrysomelidae
- Genus: Heterispa
- Species: H. vinula

Binomial name
- Heterispa vinula (Erichson, 1847)

Synonyms
- Anoplitis (Uroplata) vinula Erichson, 1847; Uroplata westwoodi Baly, 1885; Uroplata (Heterispa) breveapicalis Pic, 1931; Heterispa bogotensis Weise, 1921

= Heterispa vinula =

Species of beetle

Heterispa vinula is a species of beetle of the family Chrysomelidae. It is found in Belize, Bolivia, Colombia, Costa Rica, Ecuador, Mexico (Guerrero, Jalisco, Oaxaca, Quintana Roo, Tabasco, Tamaulipas, Veracruz, Yucatán), Nicaragua, Panama, Peru and Venezuela.

== Description ==
The vertex is smooth and opaque. The interocular space is produced, with its apex angulate. The antennae are rather more than one third the length of the body, filiform and very slightly thickened towards the apex. The thorax is transverse, the sides straight and parallel to the middle, then obliquely converging to the apex, the apical angle not produced upper surface transversely convex, broadly depressed on the hinder disc, opaque, closely obscure fulvous. The lateral margin, a broad discoidal vitta (the latter sometimes abbreviated anteriorly) together with the apical margin, is black. The scutellum is also black. The elytra are parallel and rounded at the apex. The lateral margin is obsoletely serrulate, the apical one rather coarsely serrate, the apical teeth sometimes placed at irregular intervals along the margin. Each elytron has ten, at the extreme base with eleven, rows of punctures, the second interspace strongly costate, the fourth interspace at its apex, the sixth at the base, and the entire eighth, less strongly raised.

== Biology ==
They have been recorded feeding on Apeiba membranacea, Triumfetta josefina, Guazuma ulmifolia, as well as Sida (including Sida rhombifolia and Sida carpinifolia) and Infigofera species.
