= Fiber crop =

Plant grown for fiber

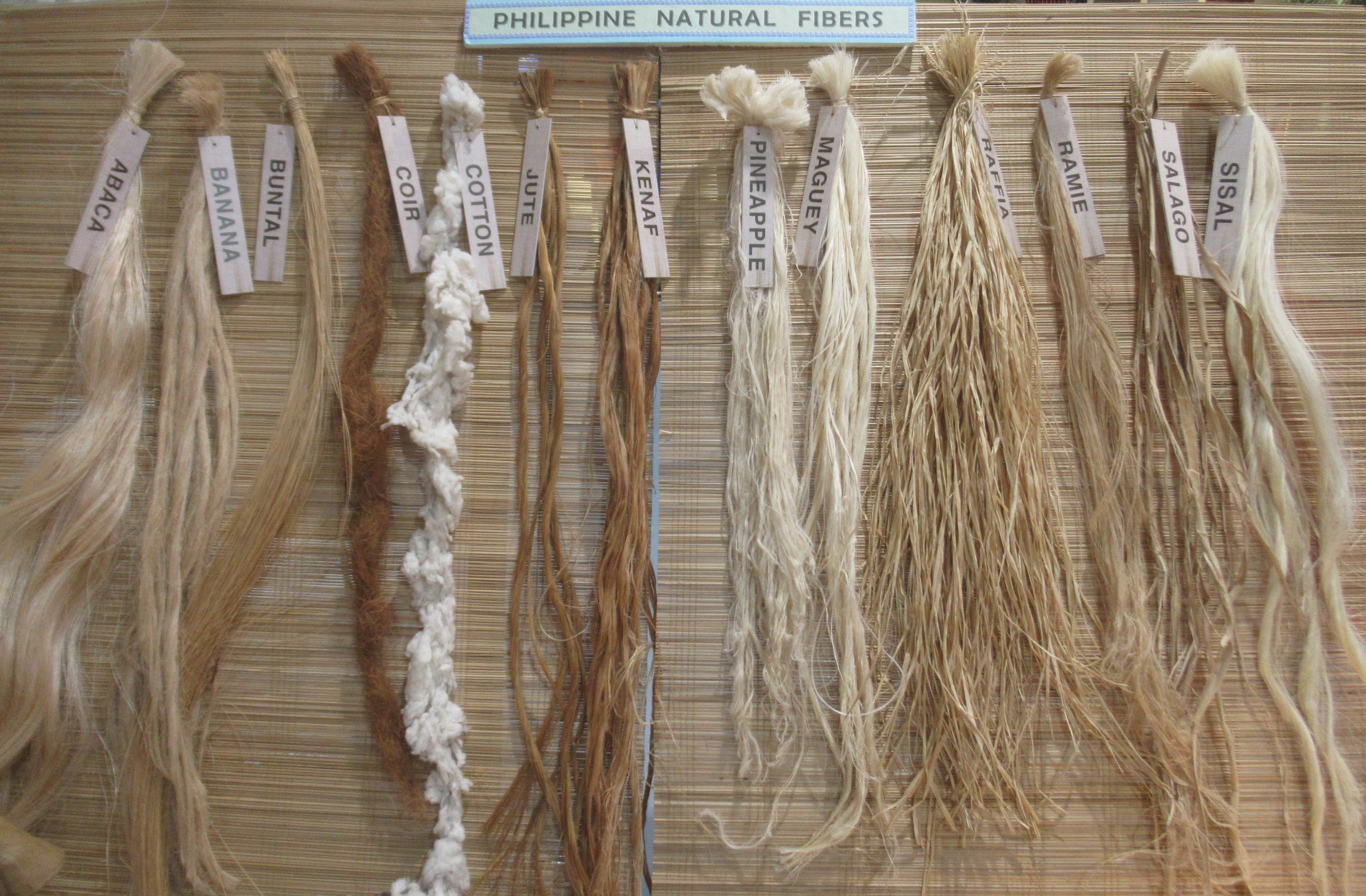
Philippine natural fibers

Fiber crops are field crops grown for their fibers, which are traditionally used to make paper, cloth, or rope. Fiber crops are characterized by having a large concentration of cellulose, which is what gives them their strength. The fibers may be chemically modified, like in viscose (used to make rayon and cellophane). In recent years, materials scientists have begun exploring further use of these fibers in composite materials.

Fiber crops are generally ready for harvest after a single growing season, as distinct from trees, which are typically grown for many years before being harvested for such materials as wood pulp fiber or lacebark. In specific circumstances, fiber crops can be superior to wood pulp fiber in terms of technical performance, environmental impact or cost.

Botanically, the fibers harvested from many of these plants fall into four categories: bast fibers, from the phloem tissue of the plant; hard/leaf fibers (from the entirety of plant vascular bundles); surface (seed) fibers (from plant epidermal tissue); and pith.

== Fiber sources ==
To have a source of fiber to utilize in production, the fiber first must be extracted from the plant. This is done in different ways depending on the fiber classification. Bast fibers are harvested through retting which is where microbes are utilized to remove soft tissues from the plant and only the useful fibrous material remains. Hard fibers are harvested mainly through decortication which is where the non-fibrous tissues are removed by hand or machine. Lastly, surface fibers are harvested through ginning which is where a machine removes the fibers from other plant material.

Production of fibre crops

Fiber crop yield

=== Paper ===
Before the industrialization of paper production the most common fiber source was recycled fibers from used textiles, called rags. The rags were from ramie, hemp, linen and cotton. A process for removing printing inks from recycled paper was invented by German jurist Justus Claproth in 1774. Today this method is called deinking. It was not until the introduction of wood pulp in 1843 that paper production was not dependent on recycled materials from ragpickers.

There are a number of issues regarding the use of fiber crops to make pulp. One of these is seasonal availability. While trees can be harvested continuously, many field crops are harvested once during the year and must be stored such that the crop doesn't rot over a period of many months. Considering that many pulp mills require several thousand tonnes of fiber source per day, storage of the fiber source can be a major issue.

== Fiber crops ==
- Bast fibers (stem)
  - Bamboo, when derived from a mechanical process.
  - Dogbane, used by Native Americans
  - Esparto, a fiber from a grass
  - Flax, from which linen is derived
  - Hemp, a soft, strong fiber, edible seeds
  - Hoopvine, also used for barrel hoops and baskets, edible leaves, medicine
  - Jute, widely used, it is the cheapest fiber after cotton
  - Kenaf, the interior of the plant stem is used for its fiber. Edible leaves.
  - Lotus, used to produce lotus silk
  - Nettles used to make thread and twine, clothing made from it is both durable yet soft
  - Ramie, a member of the nettle family.
  - Spanish broom, a legume, its fiber has similar characteristics to linen.
  - Tilia, known as Linden or Lime in Europe and Basswood in North America. Fiber comes from inner bark.
- Pith (stem)
  - Papyrus, a pith fiber
- Leaf fibers
  - Abacá, a banana, producing "manila" rope from leaves
  - Piña, from pineapple leaves
  - Sisal, an agave
  - Bowstring hemp, a common house plant, also Sansevieria roxburghiana, Sansevieria hyacinthoides
  - Henequen, an agave. A useful fiber, but not as high quality as sisal
  - Phormium, "New Zealand Flax"
  - Yucca, an agave relative
- Seed fibers and fruit fibers
  - Coir, the fiber from the coconut husk
  - Cotton
  - Kapok
  - Milkweed, grown for the filament-like pappus in its seed pods
  - Luffa, a gourd which when mature produces a sponge-like mass of xylem, used to make loofa sponge.
  - Walissima is a natural plant fiber obtained from Sida rhombifolia of the Malvaceae family. It is produced mainly in the Philippines.
