= Antaeotricha irene =

Scientific classification
- Domain: Eukaryota
- Kingdom: Animalia
- Phylum: Arthropoda
- Class: Insecta
- Order: Lepidoptera
- Family: Depressariidae
- Genus: Antaeotricha
- Species: A. irene

Binomial name
- Antaeotricha irene (Barnes & Busck, 1920)

Synonyms
- Stenoma irene Barnes & Busck, 1920

Species of moth

Antaeotricha irene is a moth in the family Depressariidae. It was described by William Barnes and August Busck in 1920. It is found in North America, where it has been recorded from Texas.

The wingspan is 19–20 mm. The forewings of the females are white with the extreme base of the dorsal edge dark fuscous, and with a conspicuous deep black short transverse streak on the end of the cell. There is a faint, ill-defined fuscous shade below this to the tornus and there is a very faint narrow transverse, outwardly curved, fuscous line across the apical part of the wing. In some specimens, there is a cloudy spot on the middle of the dorsum. The males have the entire basal fifth of the wing blackish brown and have besides the pattern of the female additional cloudy ill-defined, more or less transverse areas on the middle of the wing and across apical third. There is also an interrupted line of small black marginal dots. The hindwings are light whitish fuscous.

The larvae feed on Sida species.
