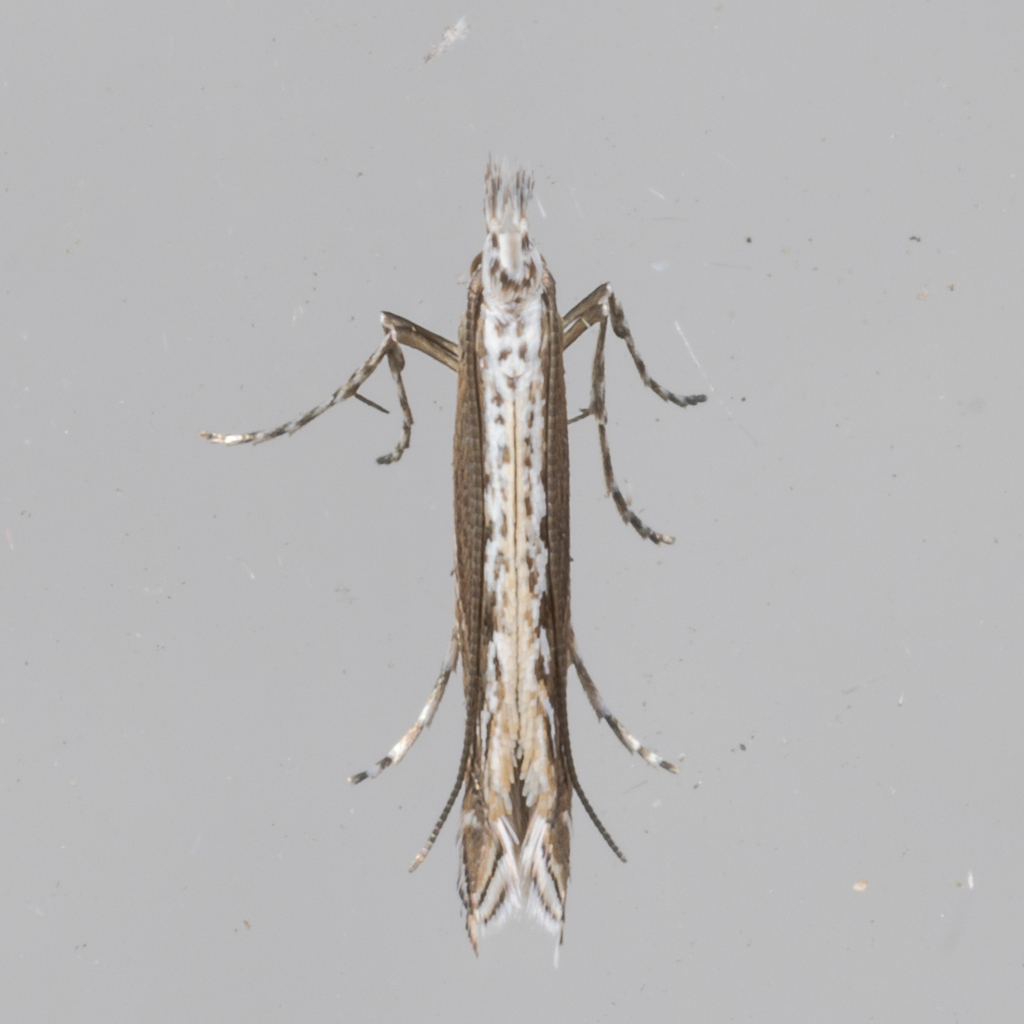

Scientific classification
- Kingdom: Animalia
- Phylum: Arthropoda
- Clade: Pancrustacea
- Class: Insecta
- Order: Lepidoptera
- Family: Gracillariidae
- Genus: Acrocercops
- Species: A. quinquistrigella

Binomial name
- Acrocercops quinquistrigella (Chambers, 1875)

Synonyms
- Acrocercops quinquestrigella (Chambers, 1877); Acrocercops quniquestrigella (Dyar, [1903])

= Acrocercops quinquistrigella =

Species of moth

Acrocercops quinquistrigella is a moth of the family Gracillariidae. It is known from the United States (Kentucky, Texas, Florida and Georgia).

The larvae feed on Sida rhombifolia. They probably mine the leaves of their host plant.
