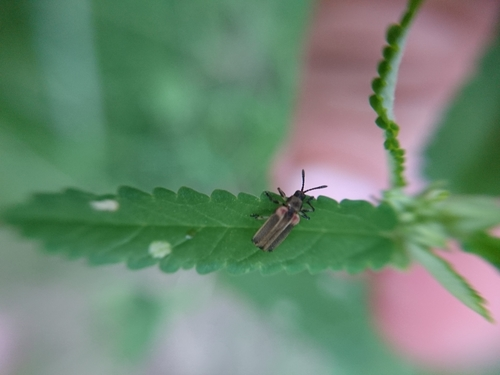

Scientific classification
- Kingdom: Animalia
- Phylum: Arthropoda
- Clade: Pancrustacea
- Class: Insecta
- Order: Coleoptera
- Suborder: Polyphaga
- Infraorder: Cucujiformia
- Family: Chrysomelidae
- Genus: Heterispa
- Species: H. costipennis

Binomial name
- Heterispa costipennis (Boheman, 1858)

Synonyms
- Odontota costipennis Boheman, 1858; Heterispa orientalis Weise, 1906

= Heterispa costipennis =

Species of beetle

Heterispa costipennis is a species of beetle of the family Chrysomelidae. It is found in Argentina, Bolivia, Brazil (Bahia, Rio Grande do Sul, São Paulo, Pernambuco), Ecuador, Panama, Paraguay and Uruguay.

== Description ==
Adults reach a length of about 5-5.5 mm. Adults are black, while the prothorax is yellow, with three black spots. The elytra are black with a humeral orange spot and apical yellow marking.

== Biology ==
They have been recorded feeding on Paspalum, Panicum and Althaea species, as well as on Sida rhombifolia, Sphaeralcea bonariensis and Malvastrum coromandelianum.
