= Sida mysorensis =

Scientific classification
- Kingdom: Plantae
- Clade: Tracheophytes
- Clade: Angiosperms
- Clade: Eudicots
- Clade: Rosids
- Order: Malvales
- Family: Malvaceae
- Genus: Sida
- Species: S. mysorensis

Binomial name
- Sida mysorensis Wight & Arn.

Synonyms
- Sida urticifolia A.St.-Hil.; Sida urticifolia Wight & Arn.; Sida wightiana D.Dietr.

Species of flowering plant

Sida mysorensis, common name in India Mysore fanpetals, is a plant species native to South and Southeast Asia. It has been reported from the wild in Indonesia, Vietnam, Laos, Cambodia, Thailand, India, Pakistan and southern China, and is cultivated elsewhere. It grows in grassy slopes, on roadsides, and in forest boundaries.

Sida mysorensis is an erect herb up to 1 m (40 inches) tall. The stem and leaves are covered with stellate and glandular hairs. Leaves are ovate (egg-shaped) to cordate (heart-shaped), up to 6 cm (2.4 inches) long. Flowers are yellow, solitary in leaf axils or at the tips of branches.

Sida mysorensis is similar to S. javensis and S. cordata but distinguished by its erect habit and hairy shoots.

The species is named for the City of Mysore, India.
