= Heterispa infuscata =

Scientific classification
- Kingdom: Animalia
- Phylum: Arthropoda
- Class: Insecta
- Order: Coleoptera
- Suborder: Polyphaga
- Infraorder: Cucujiformia
- Family: Chrysomelidae
- Genus: Heterispa
- Species: H. infuscata

Binomial name
- Heterispa infuscata (Chapuis, 1875)

Synonyms
- Uroplata (Heterispa) infuscata Chapuis, 1875

Species of beetle

Heterispa infuscata is a species of beetle of the family Chrysomelidae. It is found in Brazil (Bahia).
