= Heterispa =

Scientific classification
- Kingdom: Animalia
- Phylum: Arthropoda
- Clade: Pancrustacea
- Class: Insecta
- Order: Coleoptera
- Suborder: Polyphaga
- Infraorder: Cucujiformia
- Family: Chrysomelidae
- Subfamily: Cassidinae
- Tribe: Chalepini
- Genus: Heterispa; Chapuis, 1875

Genus of leaf beetles

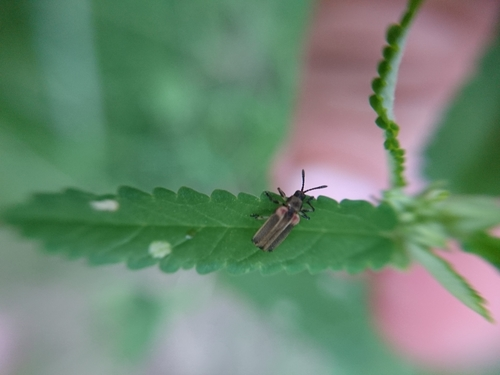
Heterispa costipennis

Heterispa is a genus of beetles belonging to the family Chrysomelidae.

== Species ==
- Heterispa apicalis (Pic, 1927)
- Heterispa costipennis (Boheman, 1858)
- Heterispa infuscata (Chapuis, 1875)
- Heterispa limonensis (Uhmann, 1930)
- Heterispa vinula (Erichson, 1847)
