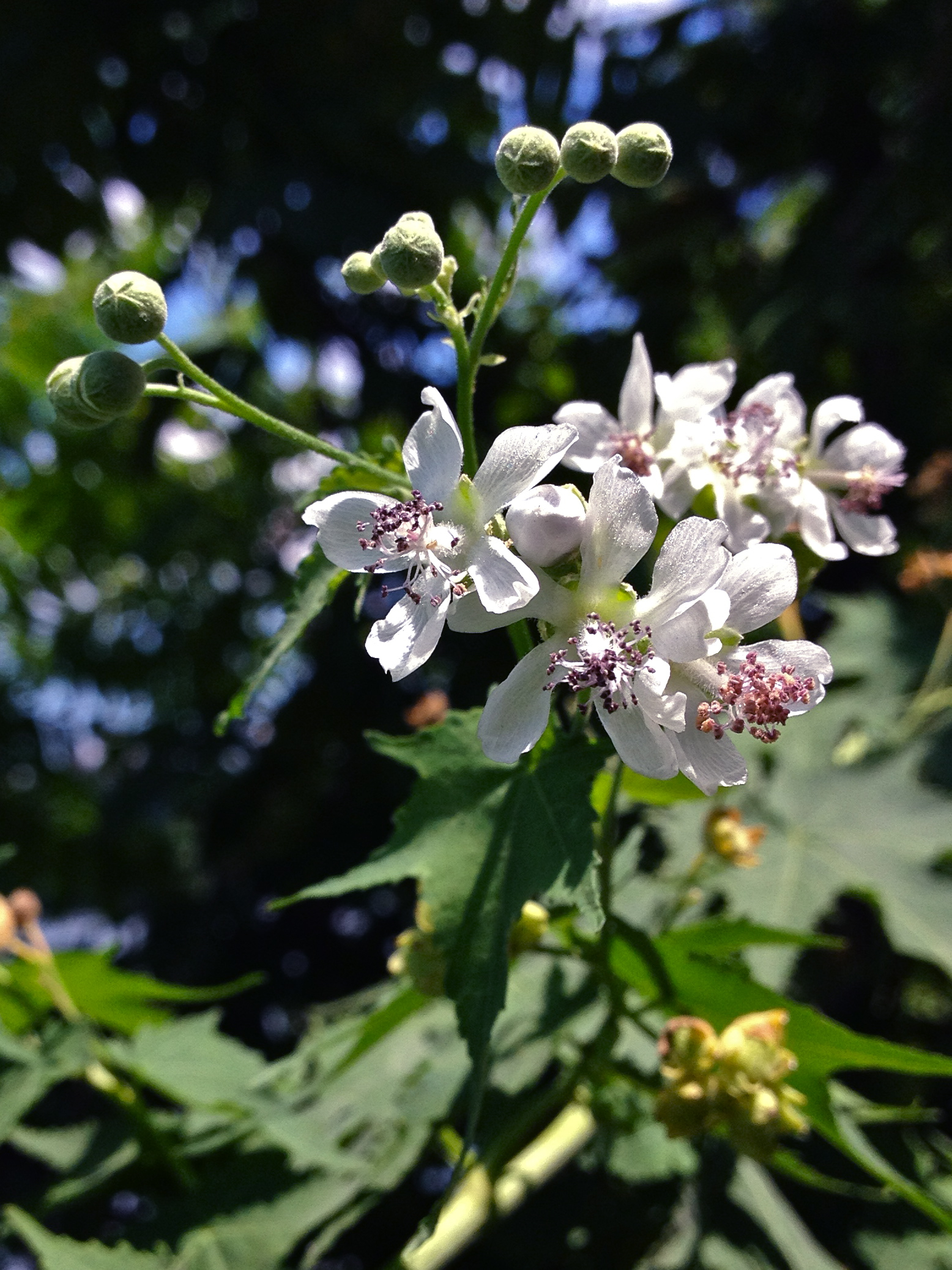

Conservation status
- Vulnerable (NatureServe)

Scientific classification
- Kingdom: Plantae
- Clade: Tracheophytes
- Clade: Angiosperms
- Clade: Eudicots
- Clade: Rosids
- Order: Malvales
- Family: Malvaceae
- Genus: Sida
- Species: S. hermaphrodita

Binomial name
- Sida hermaphrodita (L.) Rusby

Synonyms
- Napaea hermaphrodita L.; Ripariosida hermaphrodita Weakley & D.B. Poind.

= Sida hermaphrodita =

Species of flowering plant

Sida hermaphrodita, known by the common names Virginia fanpetals and Virginia mallow, is a perennial forb native to the eastern United States, which produces white flowers in summer.

== Description ==
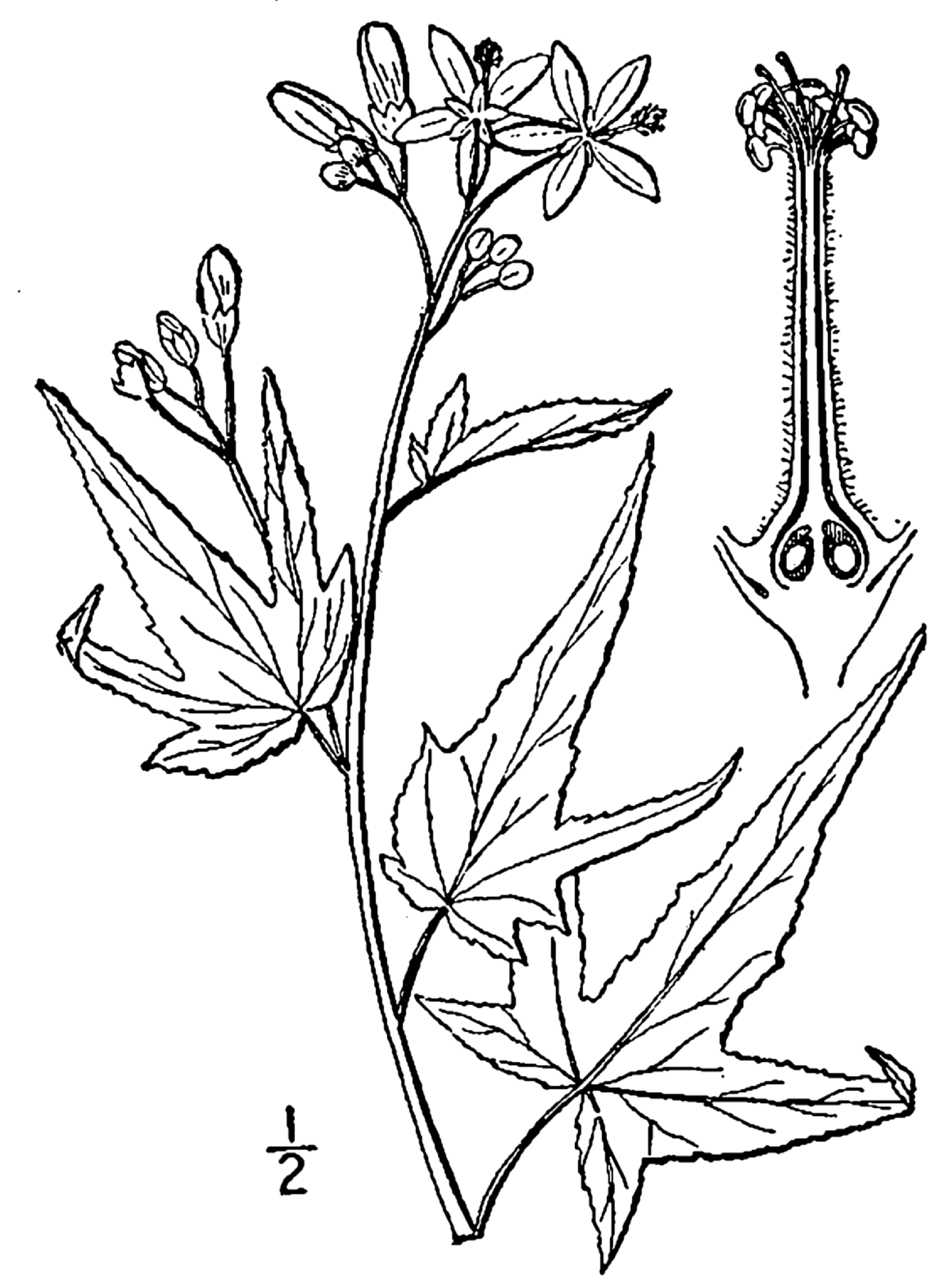
Botanical illustration of Sida hermaphrodita (1913)

The branching stem of Sida hermaphrodita is 1 to 4 meters tall, and up to 3 centimeters in diameter. The leaves are 10 to 20 centimeters long and borne on petioles. The leaves are simple, but palmately cleft into 3 to 7 lanceolate lobes. The flowers are borne in terminal clusters. Each flower has 5 petals, which are about a centimeter long. The fruit is a schizocarp that splits into segments when ripe.

== Distribution and habitat ==
Sida hermaphrodita has been recorded in Washington, D.C., Indiana, Kentucky, Massachusetts, Maryland, Michigan, New Jersey, New York, Ohio, Pennsylvania, Tennessee, Virginia, West Virginia, and the Canadian province of Ontario, although local distribution may be spotty. It is listed as an endangered species by the states of Indiana, Maryland, Tennessee, and Pennsylvania, and as a species of special concern by Kentucky. In Virginia, Sida hermaphrodita grows in habitats such as sandy or rocky river shores. The presence of this species is dependent on appropriate habitat, and it may be eliminated from an area by development, changes in land use, or competition with invasive species.

== Taxonomy ==
Recent phylogenetic research confirms that Sida hermaphrodita is not particularly closely related to other members of the genus Sida. Over the years, it has been suggested that this species might be closer related to the monotypic genus Napaea, or to Sidasodes, a genus of two species native to the Andes, however, further research has not supported either of these relationships. Virginia mallow has since been formally treated as a monotypic, isolated, temperate, North American genus, Ripariosida hermaphrodita Weakley & D. B. Poind., named for its historic preference for inundated stream-beds.

== In cultivation ==
In Poland, Sida hermaphrodita is grown for its fiber, as a source of fodder for livestock, and as a source of nectar for beekeeping. It is currently being investigated as a source of biomass for alternative energy production purposes. The results of trials in Northern Europe have demonstrated high yields, ranging from 6.7 to 16.7 oven dry metric tons per hectare (3.0 to 7.4 short ton/acre), annually, showing good properties as a feedstock for energy pellets
