= Heterispa limonensis =

Scientific classification
- Kingdom: Animalia
- Phylum: Arthropoda
- Class: Insecta
- Order: Coleoptera
- Suborder: Polyphaga
- Infraorder: Cucujiformia
- Family: Chrysomelidae
- Genus: Heterispa
- Species: H. limonensis

Binomial name
- Heterispa limonensis (Uhmann, 1930)

Synonyms
- Uroplata (Heterispa) limonensis Uhmann, 1930

Species of beetle

Heterispa limonensis is a species of beetle of the family Chrysomelidae. It is found in Costa Rica.
