= Heterispa apicalis =

Scientific classification
- Kingdom: Animalia
- Phylum: Arthropoda
- Class: Insecta
- Order: Coleoptera
- Suborder: Polyphaga
- Infraorder: Cucujiformia
- Family: Chrysomelidae
- Genus: Heterispa
- Species: H. apicalis

Binomial name
- Heterispa apicalis (Pic, 1927)

Synonyms
- Uroplata (Heterispa) apicalis Pic, 1927

Species of beetle

Heterispa apicalis is a species of beetle of the family Chrysomelidae. It is found in Colombia.

== Description ==
Adults reach a length of about 7 mm. Adults are black, while the elytra are testaceous.
