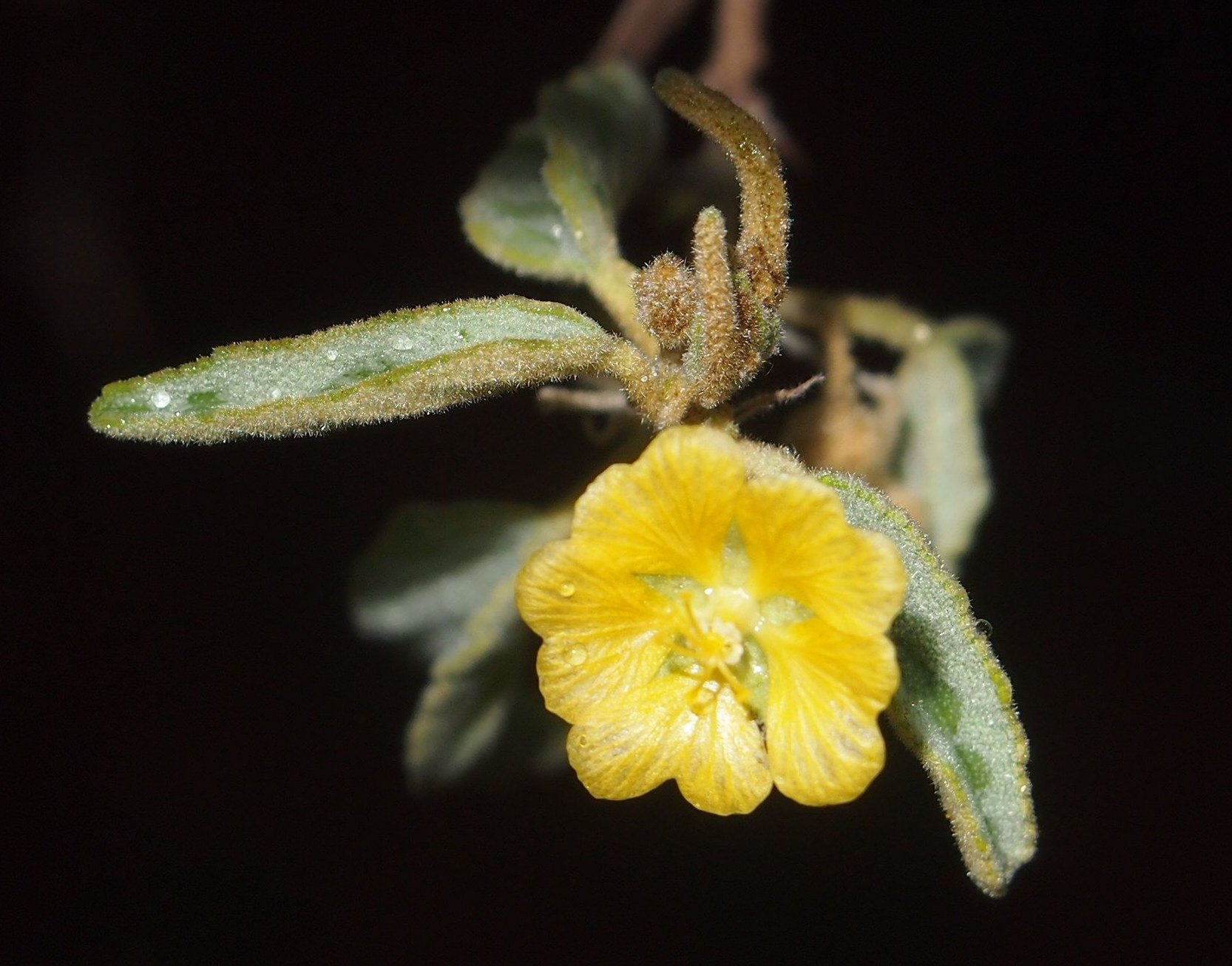

Scientific classification
- Kingdom: Plantae
- Clade: Tracheophytes
- Clade: Angiosperms
- Clade: Eudicots
- Clade: Rosids
- Order: Malvales
- Family: Malvaceae
- Genus: Sida
- Species: S. petrophila

Binomial name
- Sida petrophila F.Muell.

= Sida petrophila =

Species of shrub

Sida petrophila, commonly known as rock sida, is a flowering plant in the family Malvaceae and grows in all mainland states of Australia with the exception of Victoria and the Northern Territory. It is an upright perennial with leaves arranged alternately and yellow flowers.

== Description ==
Sida petrophila is an upright, spindly, perennial shrub to 2 m (6 ft 7 in) high, usually with a thick covering of yellowish-grey, woolly, star-shaped hairs. Its leaves are arranged alternately, grey-green, felty, 1.5–6 cm (0.59–2.36 in) long, 5–15 mm (0.20–0.59 in) wide, oblong to linear lance-shaped, with wavy or serrated edges. There are stipules 7–15 mm (0.28–0.59 in) long, sometimes persisting on older leaves. One or two flowers are borne in leaf axils on a pedicel 7–20 mm (0.28–0.79 in) long, but shorter than the leaves. The sepals are green, with lobes 4–7 mm (0.16–0.28 in) long and the five petals are yellow and 9–15 mm (0.35–0.59 in) long. Flowering occurs in most months of the year and the fruit is a wrinkled mericarp and 5–7 mm (0.20–0.28 in) in diameter, covered with soft, star-shaped hairs.

== Taxonomy and naming ==
Sida petrophila was first formally described in 1853 by Ferdinand von Mueller and the description was published in Linnaea: ein Journal für die Botanik in ihrem ganzen Umfange, oder Beiträge zur Pflanzenkunde. The specific epithet (petrophila) means 'rock loving'.

== Distribution and habitat ==
Rock sida grows on stony slopes and shallow sandy soils in the south-west of Western Australia, and in South Australia, New South Wales and Queensland.
