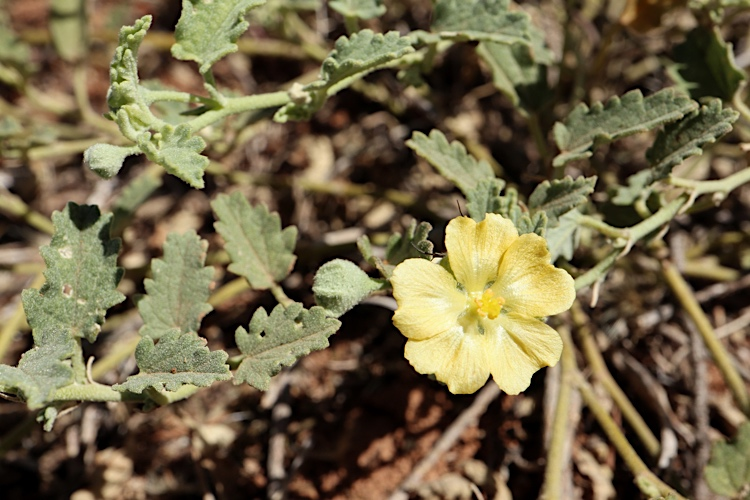

Scientific classification
- Kingdom: Plantae
- Clade: Tracheophytes
- Clade: Angiosperms
- Clade: Eudicots
- Clade: Rosids
- Order: Malvales
- Family: Malvaceae
- Genus: Sida
- Species: S. corrugata

Binomial name
- Sida corrugata Lindl.

= Sida corrugata =

Species of shrub

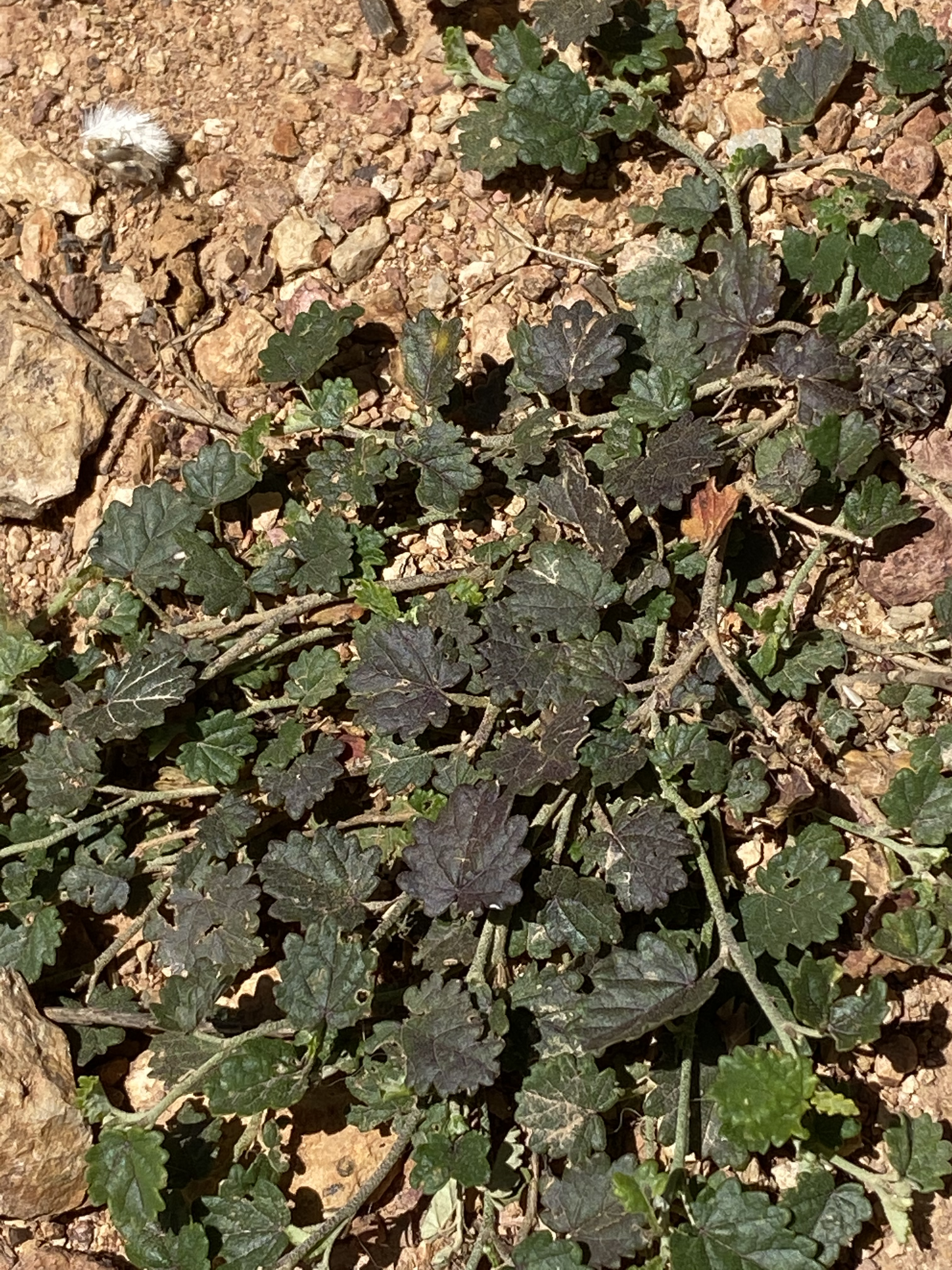
Habit

Sida corrugata commonly known as corrugate sida, is a flowering plant in the family Malvaceae. It is a spreading perennial with yellow flowers, hairy leaves and grows on all mainland states of Australia with the exception of Western Australia and the Northern Territory.

== Description ==
Sida corrugata is a decumbent or prostrate perennial, spreading to 30 cm (12 in) in diameter, smooth or with a dense covering of matted hairs. Leaves are arranged alternately, hairy, narrowly ovate or linear 5–50 mm (0.20–1.97 in) long, 2–10 mm (0.079–0.394 in) wide, rounded at the base or almost heart-shaped, grayish green to dark green on upper surface, paler underneath and finely toothed along the margin on a petiole 1.3–2.3 mm (0.051–0.091 in) long. Flowers have five yellow petals 5–6 mm (0.20–0.24 in) long, calyx lobes 1.5–2.5 mm (0.059–0.098 in) long, triangular-shaped ending in point at the apex. Flowering may occur at any time of the year and the fruit is a deeply corrugated globe-shaped mericarp, 5 mm (0.20 in) in diameter and densely covered in short, soft hairs.

== Taxonomy ==
Sida corrugata was first formally described in 1838 by John Lindley and the description was published in Three Expeditions into the interior of Eastern Australia.

== Distribution and habitat ==
Corrugate sida grows in a variety of situations including clay, fertile loams and sandy soils in grassland and woodlands in New South Wales, Queensland, Victoria, South Australia and the Northern Territory.
