= Sida clementii =

Scientific classification
- Kingdom: Plantae
- Clade: Tracheophytes
- Clade: Angiosperms
- Clade: Eudicots
- Clade: Rosids
- Order: Malvales
- Family: Malvaceae
- Genus: Sida
- Species: S. clementii

Binomial name
- Sida clementii Domin

Species of shrub

Sida clementii is a shrub in the family Malvaceae, native to Western Australia. It has an erect, spreading habit and grows to between 0.4 and 1.3 metres high. Yellow flowers are produced between March and May and again between September and November in the species' native range on plains in the Pilbara.

The species was first formally described by Czech botanist Karel Domin in 1930 in Bibliotheca Botanica, from plant material collected by Emile Clement between the Ashburton and Yule Rivers.
