= Sida spenceriana =

Conservation status
- Data Deficient (TPWCA)

Scientific classification
- Kingdom: Plantae
- Clade: Tracheophytes
- Clade: Angiosperms
- Clade: Eudicots
- Clade: Rosids
- Order: Malvales
- Family: Malvaceae
- Genus: Sida
- Species: S. spenceriana

Binomial name
- Sida spenceriana F.Muell.
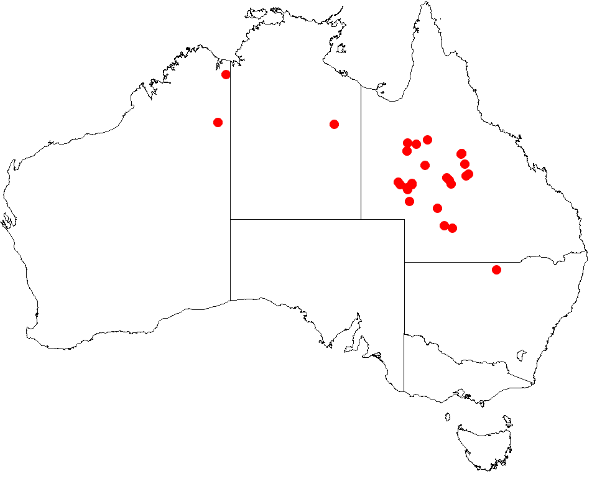
- Occurrence data from AVH

Species of flowering plant

Sida spenceriana is a small plant in the family Malvaceae found in Queensland, the Northern Territory and Western Australia

== Description ==
Sida spenceriana is a herb or shrub, which has hairy stems. The leaves are not lobed, have entire margins and are 10–24 mm long by 1.5–3 mm wide, have a covering of stellate hairs. There are stipules (7–10 mm long) which persist in with the older leaves. The flower has a pedicel (15–30 mm) and the perianth consists of two whorls (both calyx and corolla). It, too, has stellate hairs. The calyx is green, 4 mm long, and the lobes are fused joined for half or more of their length. The corolla is yellow, without a hairy covering and is 6 mm long. There are many stamens which are united in a staminal tube around the style. The anthers are 0.5 mm long. The ovary is quite smooth. There is a single style (2.7 mm long) which has five or numerous style branches or lobes, which are mostly smooth.

A further description is found in (Barker, 2007), where the calyx is described as being sometimes ribbed but not 10-ribbed at the base, and further, that this species has 13-15 mericarps.

The fruits are schizocarps. It flowers in August (in Western Australia).

== Distribution ==
In Western Australia, it is found in the IBRA bioregions of Tanami and Victoria Bonaparte. in the Northern Territory it is found in the IBRA bioregions of Gulf Plains, and Mitchell Grass Downs.

== Taxonomy ==
Sida spenceriana was first described in 1885 by Ferdinand von Mueller from a specimen (MEL 0053777A) collected by Jessie Spencer ("Mrs F. Spencer") "at Yappunyah and Thargomindah close to the Paroo River" in 1885. The specific epithet, spenceriana, honours her.

== Conservation status ==
In Western Australia, it is listed as "not threatened", while in the Northern Territory it is listed as "data deficient", and in Queensland as of "least concern."
