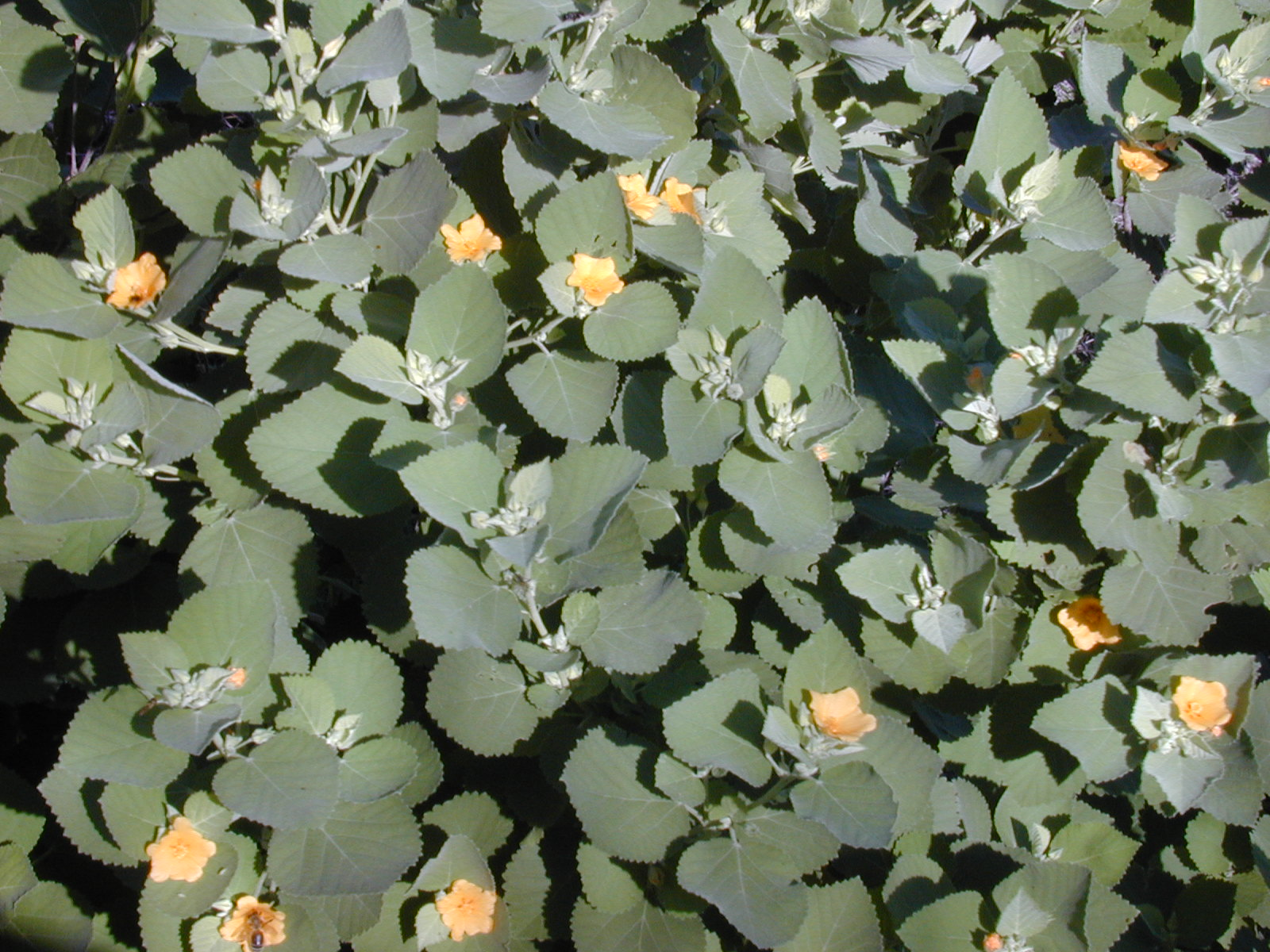

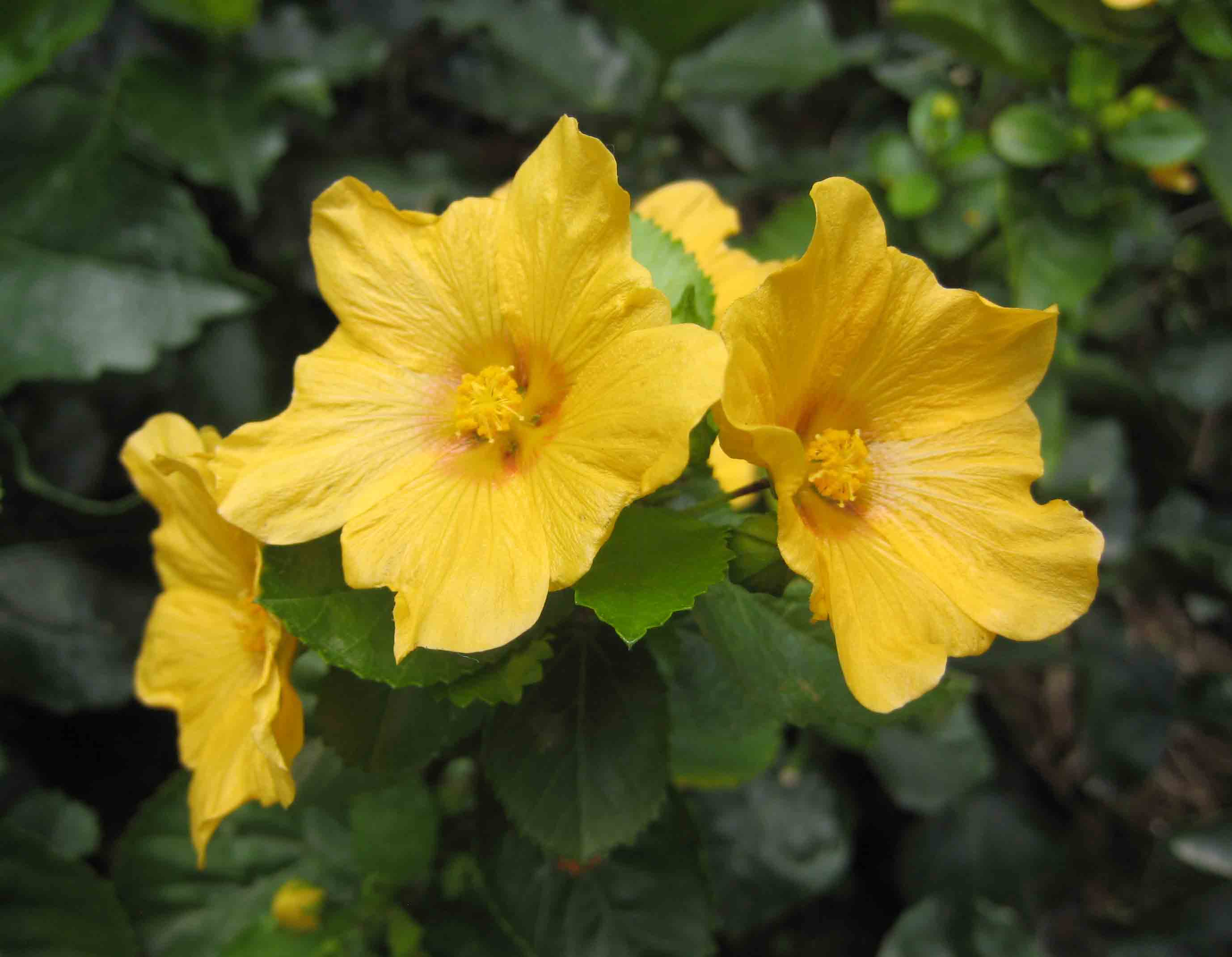

Scientific classification
- Kingdom: Plantae
- Clade: Tracheophytes
- Clade: Angiosperms
- Clade: Eudicots
- Clade: Rosids
- Order: Malvales
- Family: Malvaceae
- Genus: Sida
- Species: S. fallax

Binomial name
- Sida fallax Walp.

= Sida fallax =

Species of plant

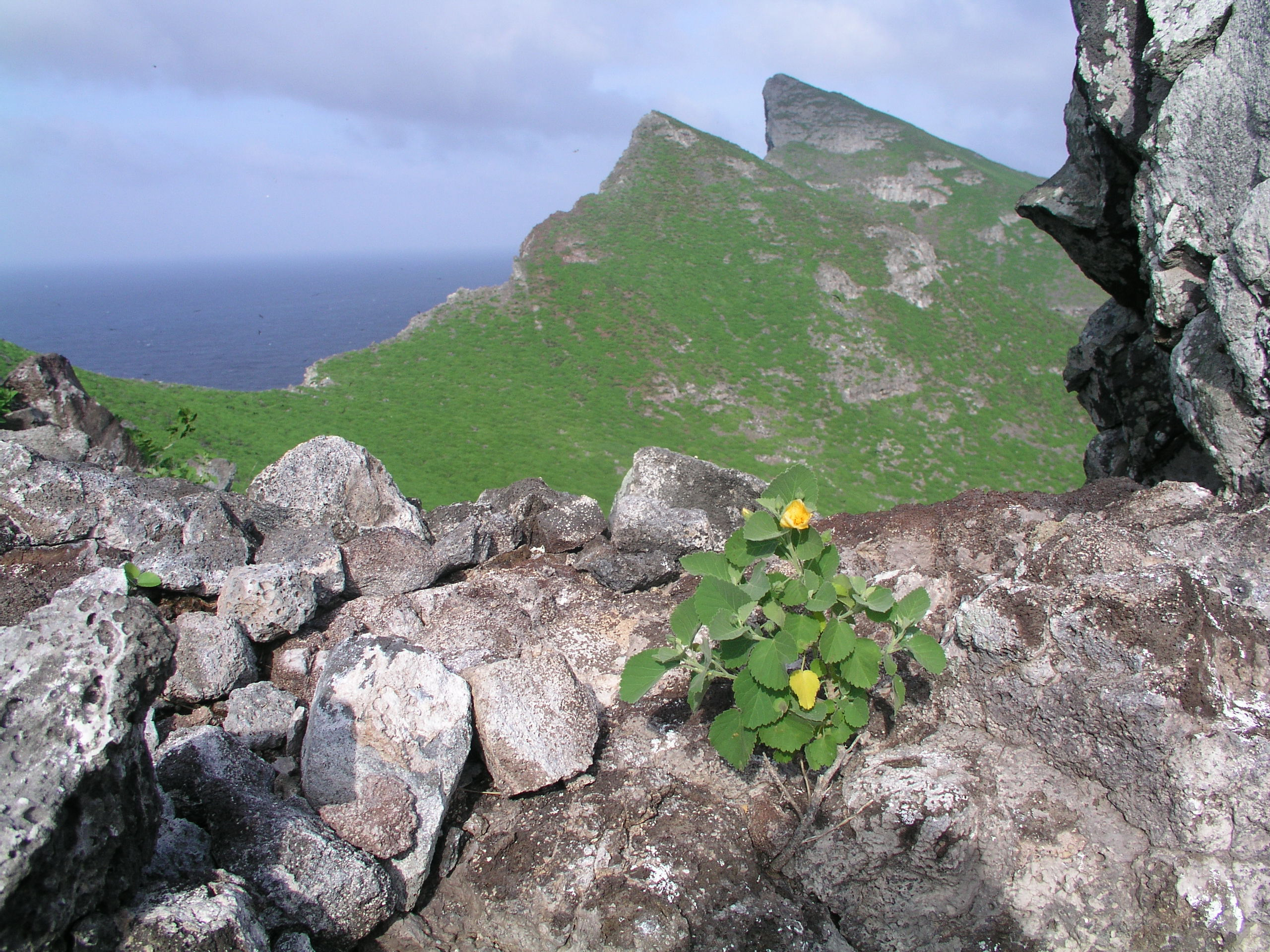
Sida fallax on Nīhoa island

Sida fallax, known as yellow ilima, golden mallow, or ʻIlima is a species of herbaceous flowering plant in the Hibiscus family, Malvaceae, indigenous to the Hawaiian Archipelago and other Pacific Islands. Plants may be erect or prostrate and are found in drier areas in sandy soils, often near the ocean. ʻIlima is the symbol of Laloimehani and is the flower for the islands of Oʻahu, Hawaiʻi, and Abemama, Kiribati.

It is known as ʻilima or ʻāpiki in Hawaiian and as kio in Marshallese, te kaura in Kiribati, idibin ekaura in Nauruan, and akatā in Tuvalu.

In Hawaiian religion, the ʻilima flowers are associated with Laka, the goddess of the hula, and the plant's prostrate form with Pele's brother, Kane-ʻapua, the god of taro planters. Lei made from ʻilima were believed to attract mischievous spirits (thus its alternative name, ʻāpiki), although some considered them to be lucky.

== Description ==
The flowers are small, 0.75–1 in (1.9–2.5 cm) in diameter; have five petals; and range from golden yellow to orange in color.

ʻIlima grows from 6 inches (150 mm) to 10 feet (3.0 m) tall in prostrate (beach growing) and erect (upland shrub) forms. Lowland ʻilima, known as ʻilima papa, has silver-green foliage; mountain varieties have smooth, green foliage. Leaves can be long and narrow or rounded or heart-shaped with finely to coarsely serrated leaf margins. Flowers may be solitary or occur in small clusters.

== Uses ==
Native Hawaiians used ʻilima flowers to make lei, and it is possibly the only plant cultivated specifically for lei-making in ancient Hawaiʻi. About 1,000 ʻilima blossoms are needed to make one strand of a lei. ʻIlima is now planted as a commercial crop for flowers and garlands in Hawaiʻi and Kiribati; where it was once seen as only for use in lei for royalty, but it now can be worn by anyone.

The flowers are sometimes also used as a food garnish, and flowers and tender meristems are sometimes used to scent coconut oil in Nauru. The stems are used in weaving rough baskets, floor coverings, and in house thatching. The bushes are used to help prepare swamp taro beds in Hawaiʻi, and dried leaves and flowers are used as fertilizer, mulch, and sometimes compost in Kiribati. S. fallax is sometimes used as a groundcover in tropical areas.

Traditionally, ʻilima was used medicinally to ease pregnancy and as a mild laxative. The flowers were used in magic, particularly love magic; for example, in Kiribati S. fallax flowers were mixed with coconut milk and bark from Premna serratifolia trees to promote true love.
