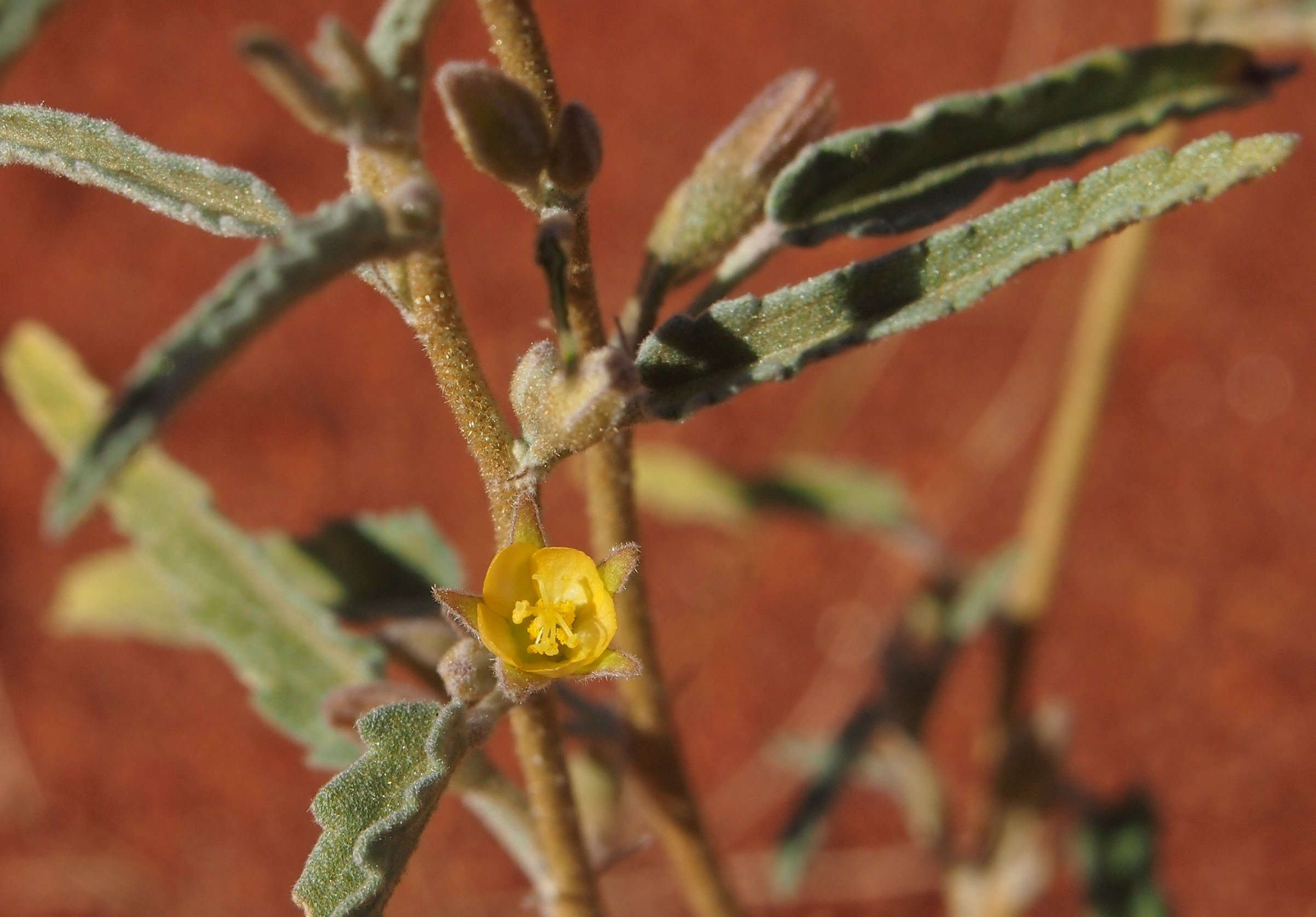

Scientific classification
- Kingdom: Plantae
- Clade: Tracheophytes
- Clade: Angiosperms
- Clade: Eudicots
- Clade: Rosids
- Order: Malvales
- Family: Malvaceae
- Genus: Sida
- Species: S. ammophila

Binomial name
- Sida ammophila F.Muell. ex J.H.Willis

= Sida ammophila =

Species of shrub

Sida ammophila commonly known as sand sida, is a flowering plant in the family Malvaceae. It is a spreading perennial with yellow flowers, bluish-green leaves and grows on all mainland states of Australia and the Northern Territory.

== Description ==
Sida ammophila is an upright or spreading, perennial shrub to about 80 cm (31 in) high with bluish-grey sometimes brownish branches densely covered in short, matted hairs. The leaves are arranged alternately along the stem, hairy, narrowly oblong or narrowly oval-shaped, 1–5 cm (0.39–1.97 in) long, 2–8 mm (0.079–0.315 in) wide and rounded or heart-shaped at the base. Both surfaces with star-shaped hairs and green-grey or bluish green above, lighter, less hairy below and minute teeth on the margins. Flowers mostly solitary, occasionally in racemes on a pedicel 1.5–25 mm (0.059–0.984 in) long, 5 petalled, pointed, yellow, and corolla 4–5 mm (0.16–0.20 in) long. Flowering may occur any time of the year and the fruit is a mericarp, 4–5 mm (0.16–0.20 in) in diameter, dark brown, wrinkled on lower surface, smooth on upper surface and occasional hairs.

== Taxonomy and naming ==
Sida ammophila was first formally described in 1967 by J.H.Willis and the description was published in Muelleria from a type specimen collected in 1851 by Ferdinand Von Mueller in South Australia. The specific epithet (ammophila) means 'sand loving'.

== Distribution and habitat ==
Sand sida grows on sand dunes, sandy soils, sandy ridges in Western Australia, South Australia, Victoria, New South Wales, Queensland and the Northern Territory.
