= Walis (fiber) =

Natural plant fiber

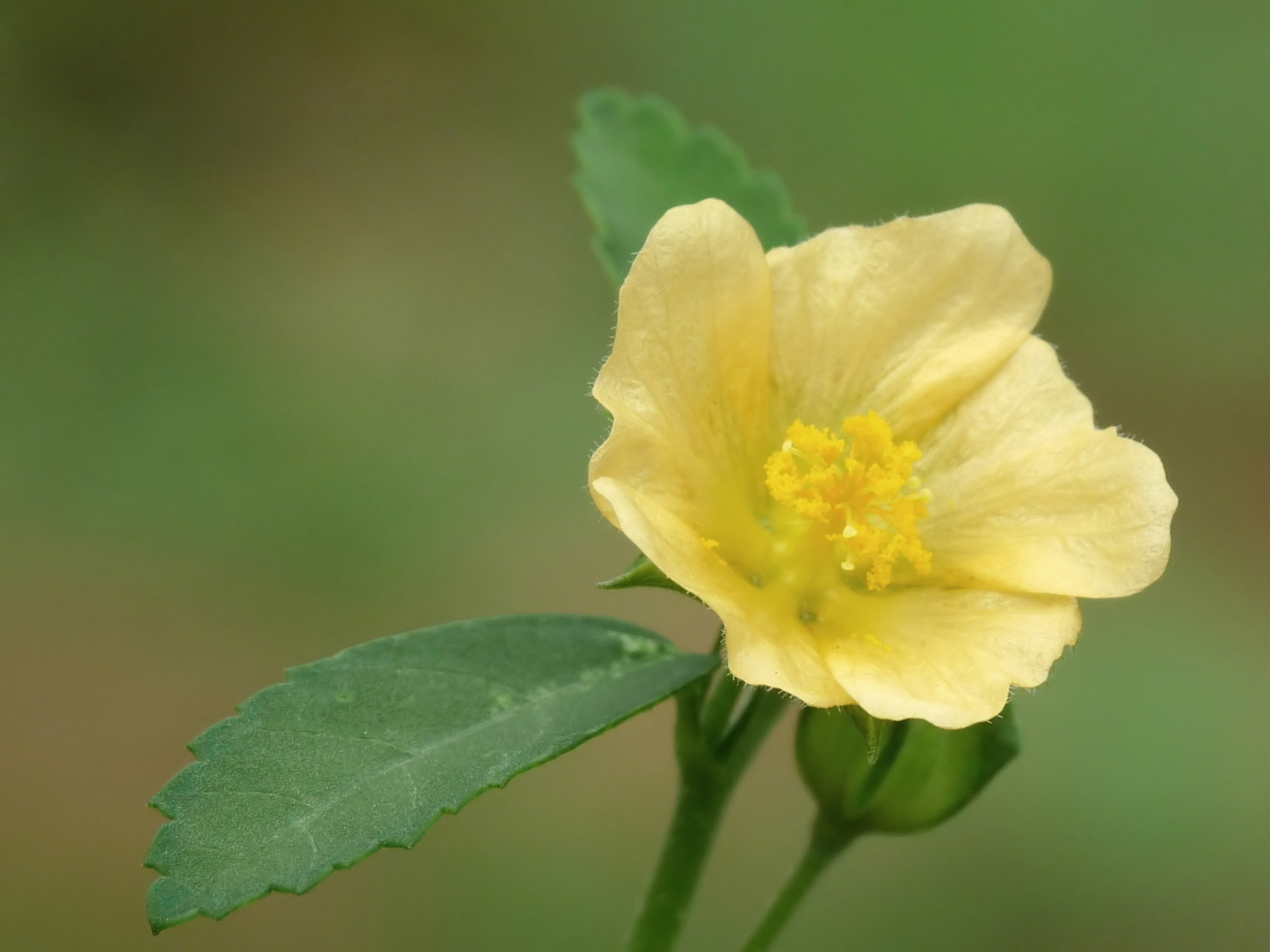
Sida rhombifolia flower.

Walis (Walissima) is a natural plant fiber obtained from the plant Sida rhombifolia, of the Malvaceae family. It is produced mainly in the Philippine islands.

== Properties ==
The fibers are white, soft, and lustrous, and have good tensile strength. Walis is similar to jute in appearance.

== Use ==
Walis is used for cordage and coarser cloths.
