= Sida javensis =

Scientific classification
- Kingdom: Plantae
- Clade: Tracheophytes
- Clade: Angiosperms
- Clade: Eudicots
- Clade: Rosids
- Order: Malvales
- Family: Malvaceae
- Genus: Sida
- Species: S. javensis

Binomial name
- Sida javensis Cav.

Synonyms
- Sida veronicifolia var. javensis (Cav.) Baker f.

Species of flowering plant

Sida javensis, common name in Taiwan translating as "Java golden flower noon" is a plant species apparently native to Indonesia, Malaysia, the Philippines and Taiwan, but naturalized in the West Indies and parts of Africa.

Sida javensis is an annual, procumbent herb up to 70 cm (28 inches) tall, rooting at the nodes. Leaves are ovate or subcordate, up to 30 cm (1.2 inches) long. Flowers are yellow, solitary, forming in the axils of the leaves. Fruit is spherical, about 3 mm in diameter. The species is closely related to S. cordata, differing by having fewer hairs along the stems, roots forming at the nodes, a glabrous filament tube, and 2 awns on the mericarp.

A subspecies, Sida javensis subsp. expilosa Borss.Waalk., has been named and accepted in some publications, but the name is now considered a synonym of S. repens
