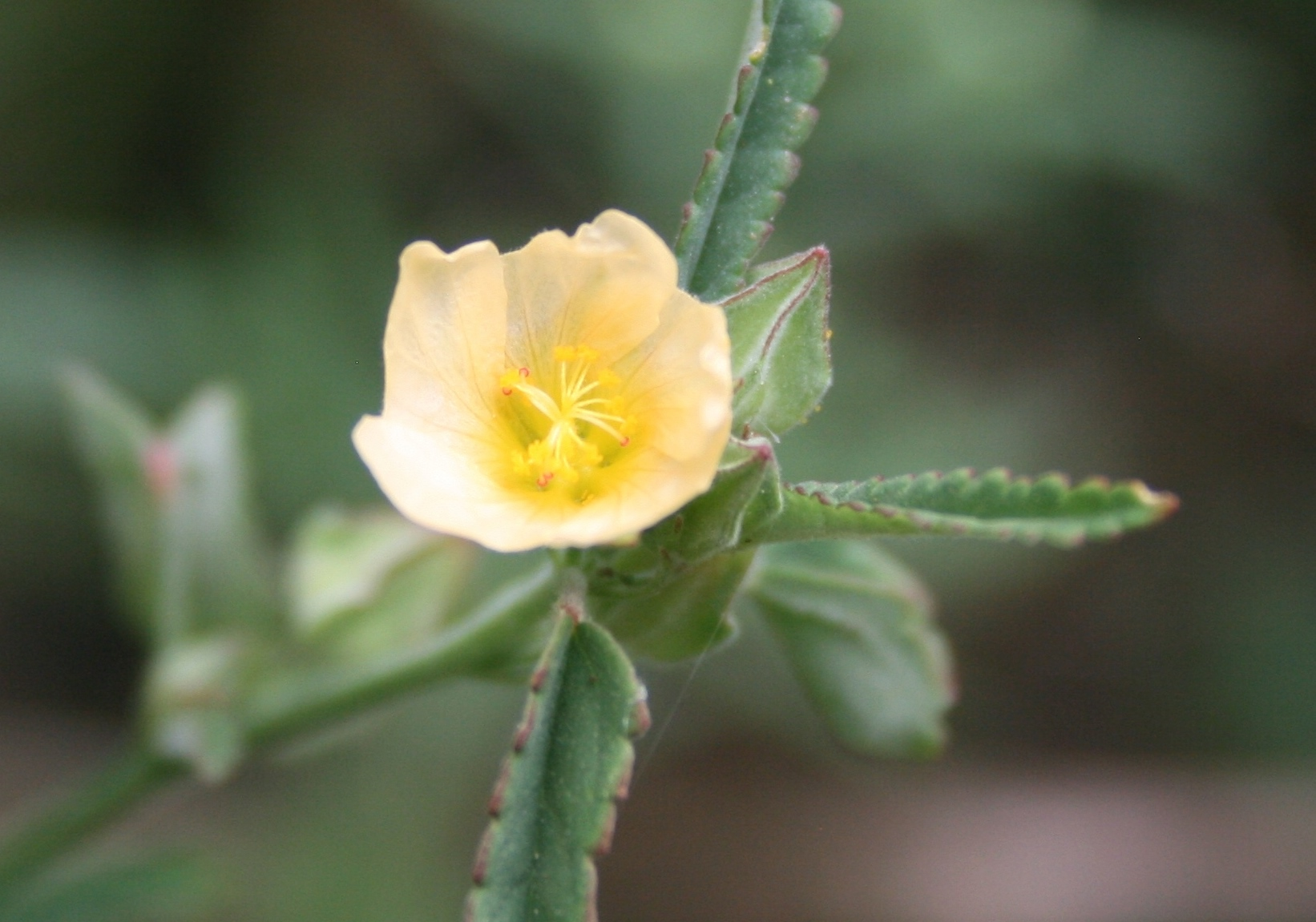
- Close-up of flower
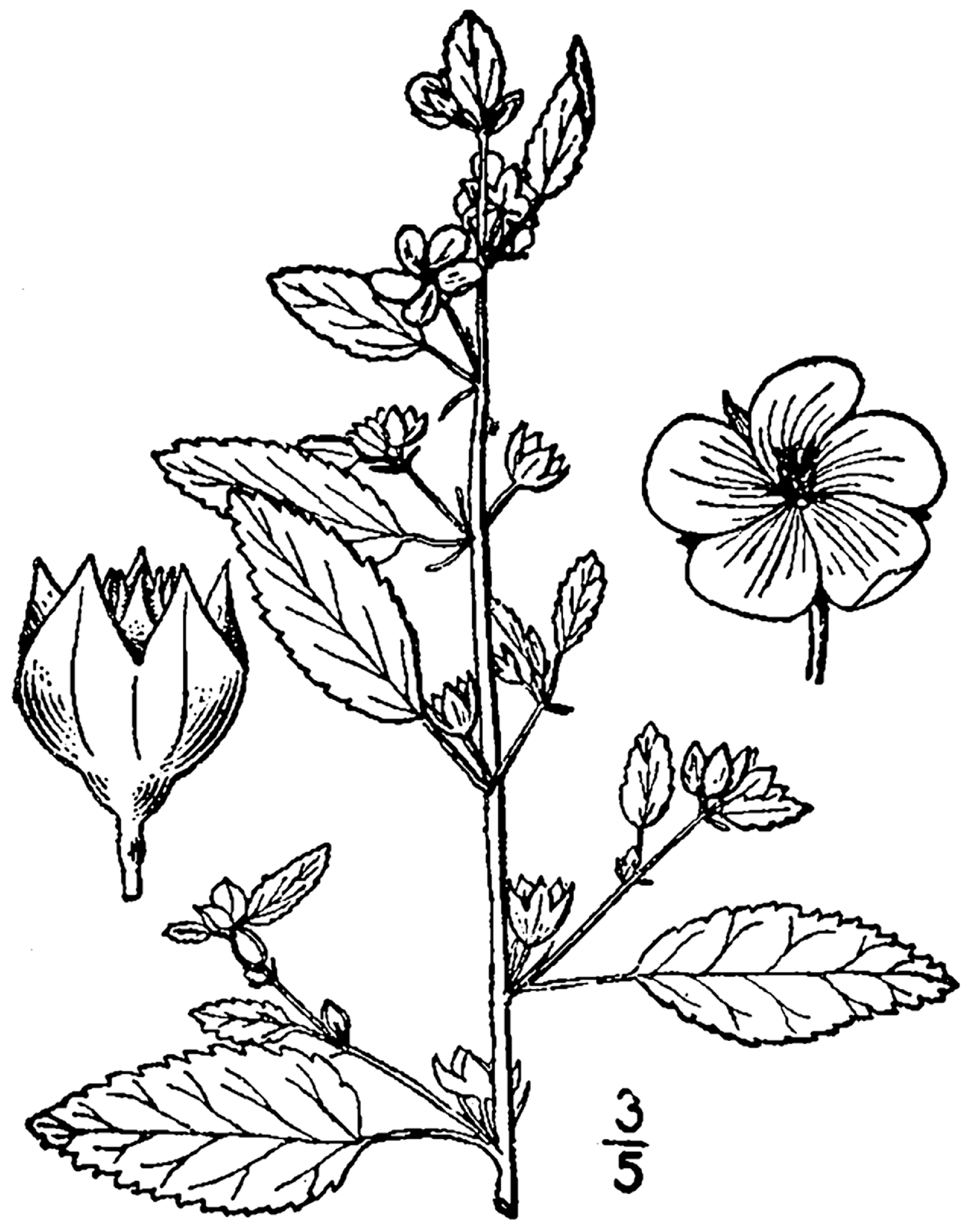
- Botanical illustration

Scientific classification
- Kingdom: Plantae
- Clade: Tracheophytes
- Clade: Angiosperms
- Clade: Eudicots
- Clade: Rosids
- Order: Malvales
- Family: Malvaceae
- Genus: Sida
- Species: S. spinosa

Binomial name
- Sida spinosa L.

Synonyms
- List: Malachodendron corchoroides (Forssk.) J.F.Gmel.; Malva spinosa (L.) E.H.L.Krause; Malvinda alnifolia Medik.; Malvinda spinosa (L.) Medik.; Sida angustifolia Lam.; Sida angustifolia var. major C.Presl; Sida betonicifolia Pav. ex Hemsl.; Sida bicolor Cav.; Sida bicuspidata J.F.Gmel.; Sida boriara Wall.; Sida emarginata Willd.; Sida glandulosa Roxb. ex Wight & Arn.; Sida heterocarpa Engelm. ex A.Gray; Sida milleri DC.; Sida minor Macfad.; Sida pimpinellifolia Mill.; Sida retusa Wight ex Mast.; Sida scabra Thonn.; Sida spinosa f. albiflora Magrath; Sida spinosa var. angustifolia Griseb.; Sida spinosa var. kazmii Abedin; Sida subdistans A.St.-Hil. & Naudin; Sida tenuicaulis Hook.f.; Sida truncata L'Hér.; Sida ulmifolia Retz.; Stewartia corchoroides Forssk.

= Sida spinosa =

Species of plant

Sida spinosa, the prickly fanpetals, is a widespread species of flowering plant in the family Malvaceae. It is native to the seasonally dry tropics and subtropics, including Latin America, the Caribbean, Africa, Madagascar, parts of the Middle East, and the Indian Subcontinent, and it has been introduced to many other locales. A subshrub or herb 0.2 to 1.0 m (8 to 39 in) high, it is typically found in disturbed situations such as roadsides and pastures.
