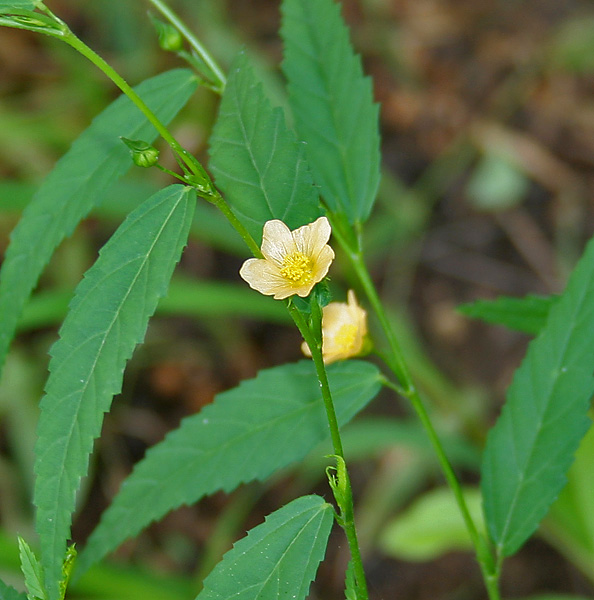

Scientific classification
- Kingdom: Plantae
- Clade: Tracheophytes
- Clade: Angiosperms
- Clade: Eudicots
- Clade: Rosids
- Order: Malvales
- Family: Malvaceae
- Genus: Sida
- Species: S. acuta

Binomial name
- Sida acuta Burm.f.

Synonyms
- Sida carpinifolia L.f.

= Sida acuta =

Common wireweed

Species of flowering plant

Sida acuta, the common wireweed, is a species of flowering plant in the mallow family, Malvaceae. It is believed to have originated in Central America, but today has a pantropical distribution and is considered a weed in some areas. In India, the indigenous people of Garo Hills in Meghalaya use this plant to make brooms.

In northern Australia, Sida acuta is considered an invasive species, and the beetle Calligrapha pantherina has been introduced as a biological control agent in an attempt to control the plant.

== Description ==
=== Plant ===
Undershrub, with mucilaginous juice, aerial, erect, cylindrical, branched, solid, green.

=== Leaves ===
Alternate, simple, lanceolate to linear, rarely ovate to oblong, obtuse at the base, acute at the apex, coarsely and remotely serrate; petiole much shorter than the blade; stipulate, stipules free-lateral, unequally paired at the node, reticulate venation.

=== Inflorescence ===
Cymose

=== Flower ===
Small, axillary, 2–3 in a cluster; pedicels jointed at the middle, epicalyx absent, complete, bisexual, regular, actinomorphic, hypogynus, pentamerous, yellow.

=== Calyx ===
Sepals: five, gamosepalous, campanulate, slightly accrescent, persistent, valvate.

=== Corolla ===
Petals: five, polypetalous but slightly connate below and jointed with the staminal column, twisted.

=== Androecium ===
Stamens many, monadelphous, arranged on the staminal column; staminal column is shorter than the petals, divided above into numerous filaments, anthers monothecous, reniform, basifixed, filament short, extrorse. Pollen are spherical with spikes, size is approximately 90 microns.

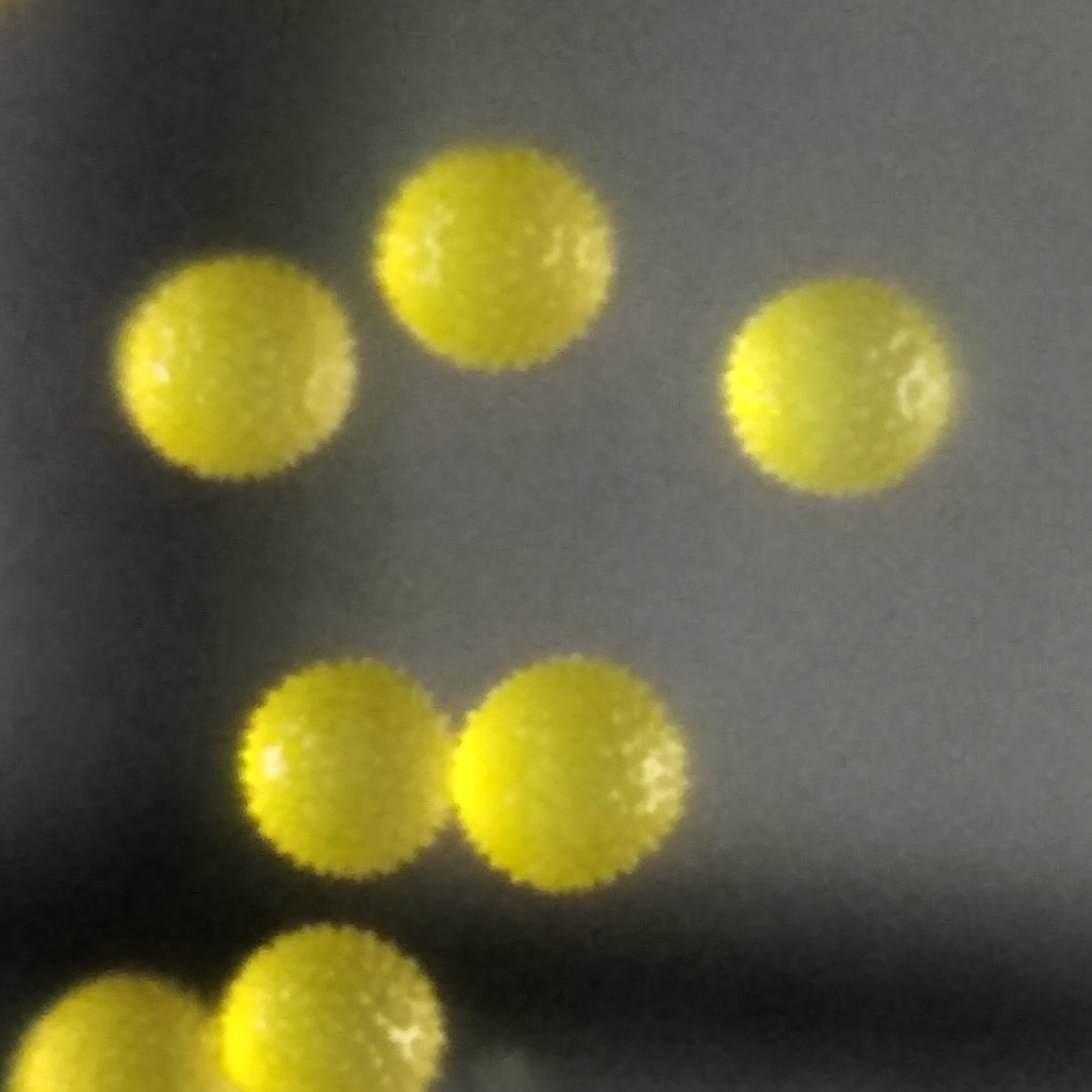
Pollen grains of Sida acuta

=== Gynoecium ===
Carples: five, syncarpous, ovary superior, penta or multilocular with axile placentation, one ovule in each locule; style 1, passing through the staminal tube; stigma globular, correspond to the number of carpels.

=== Fruit ===
A schizocarpic mericarp, seed 1 in each mericarp.

=== Classification and identification (Bentham and Hooker's system) ===
==== Class: Dicotyledonae ====
I) Reticulate venation.

II) Flower pentamerous.

==== Sub-class: Polypetalae ====
I) Petals free.

==== Series: Thalamiflorae ====
I) Flower hypogynus; ovary superior.

==== Order: Malvales ====
I) Stamens indefinite, monadelphous.

II) Ovary 5 carpellary, placentation axile.

==== Family: Malvaceae ====
I) Plant: mucilaginous.

II) Leaves: simple with free lateral stipule.

III) Flower: bisexual, petals: five, twisted; monadelphous stamen, anther one-celled, reniform.

==== Genus: Sida ====
I) Staminal column without teeth at apex.

II) Flowers without epicalyx.

III) Ovule 1 in each locule; seed 1 in each mericarp.

==== Species: S.acuta ====
I) Leaf base obtuse, apex acute.

=== Floral formula of Sida acuta ===
Br,+,K⁵,C⁵^,A_,G(⁵)

== Names ==
=== Vernacular name ===
- Sanskrit: bala
- Bengali: kureta/berela (in Tripura)
- Hindi: kareta/kharenti
- Odia (Oriya): siobala
- Gujrati: bala/jangli menthi
- Marathi: chikana
- Malayalam: malatanni
- Tamil: malaidangi,Arivaal Mooku Pachilai
- Telugu: nelabenda
- Kannada: vishakaddi
- Sinhala: gasbevila
- Burmese: katsayna
- Yoruba: Ìsékètu
- mutsvairo: Shona language
- Asante Twi: Tweta
