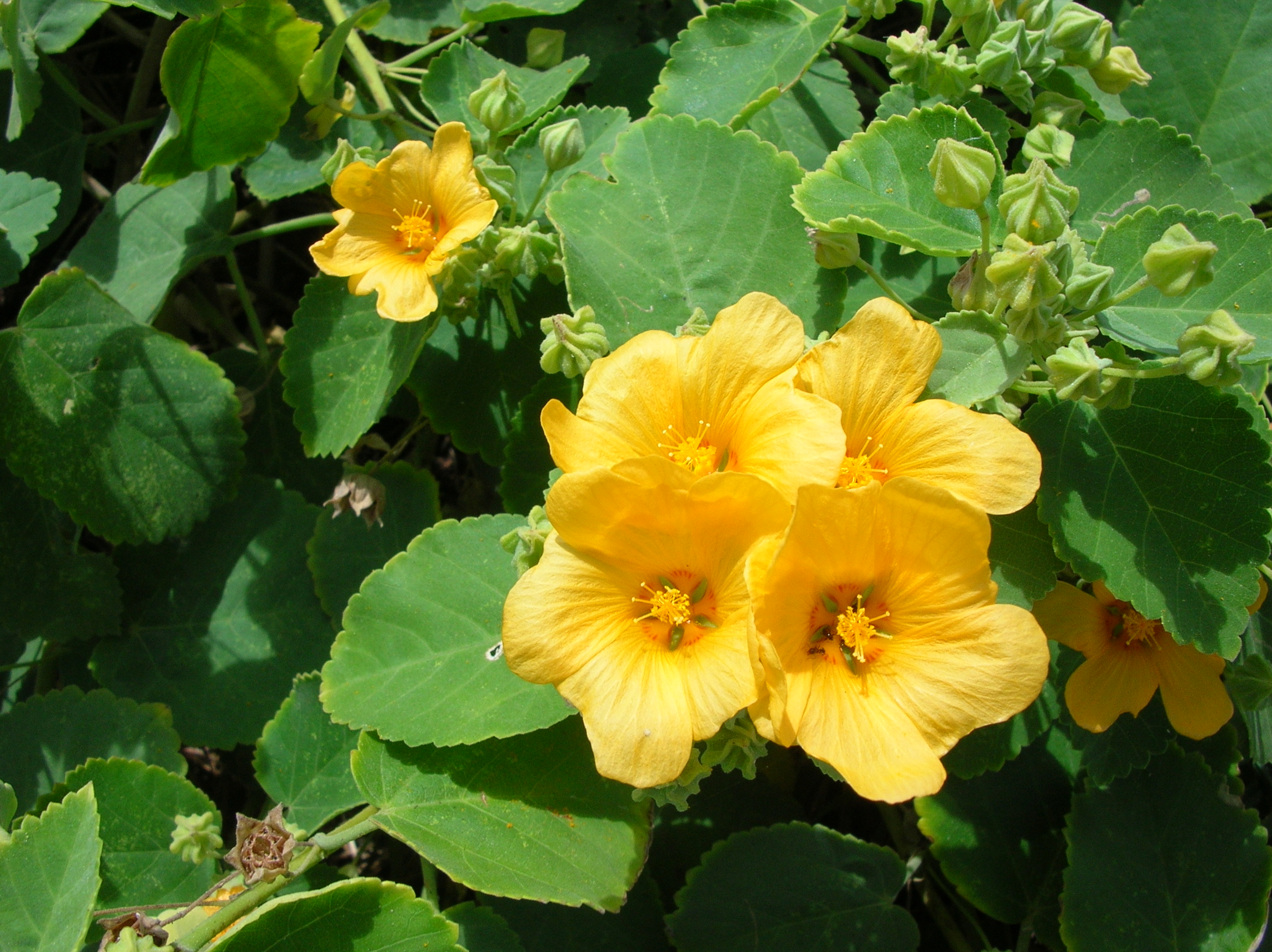
- ʻIlima (Sida fallax)

Scientific classification
- Kingdom: Plantae
- Clade: Tracheophytes
- Clade: Angiosperms
- Clade: Eudicots
- Clade: Rosids
- Order: Malvales
- Family: Malvaceae
- Subfamily: Malvoideae
- Tribe: Malveae
- Genus: Sida; L.

Species
- 98-200+, see text

Synonyms
- Diadesma Raf.; Dictyocarpus Wight; Fleischeria Steud.; Lamarkia Medik.; Malvinda Boehm.; Pseudomalachra (K.Schum.) Monteiro; Side St.-Lag., orth. var.

= Sida (plant) =

Genus of flowering plants

Sida is a genus of flowering plants in the mallow family, Malvaceae. They are distributed in tropical and subtropical regions worldwide, especially in the Americas. Plants of the genus may be known generally as fanpetals or sidas.

== Description ==
These are annual or perennial herbs or shrubs growing up to 2m tall (6 feet). Most species have hairy herbage. The leaf blades are usually unlobed with serrated edges, but may be divided into lobes. They are borne on petioles and have stipules. Flowers are solitary or arranged in inflorescences of various forms. Each has five hairy sepals and five petals in shades of yellow, orange, or white. There are many stamens and a style divided into several branches. The fruit is a disc-shaped schizocarp up to 2 cm (3/4 inch) wide which is divided into five to 12 sections, each containing one seed. The pollens are spherical in shape.

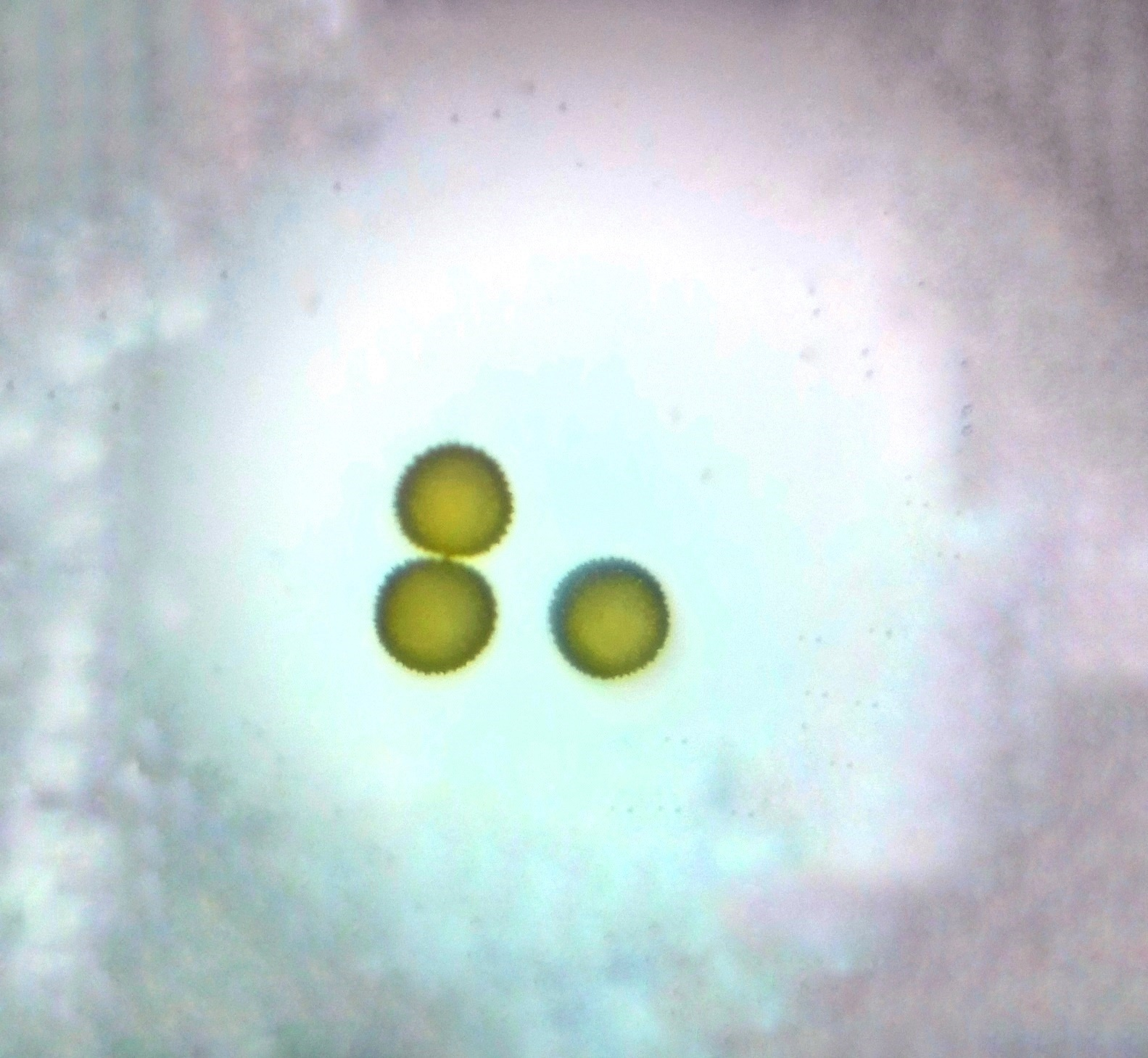
Three pollen grains of a plant in genus Sida

== Ecology ==
Many Sida are attractive to butterflies and moths. Arrowleaf sida (Sida rhombifolia), for example, is a larval host for the tropical checkered skipper (Pyrgus oileus).

The Sida golden mosaic virus and Sida golden yellow vein virus have been first isolated from Sida species; the former specifically from Sida santaremensis.

== Etymology ==
The genus name Sida is from the Greek for "pomegranate or water lily". Carl Linnaeus adopted the name from the writings of Theophrastus.

== Diversity ==
Sida has historically been a wastebasket taxon, including many plants that simply did not fit into other genera of the Malvaceae. Species have been continually reclassified. The circumscription of Sida is still unclear, with no real agreement regarding how many species belong there. Over 1000 names have been placed in the genus, and many authorities accept about 150 to 250 valid names today. Some sources accept as few as 98 species. There are many plants recognized as Sida that have not yet been described to science.

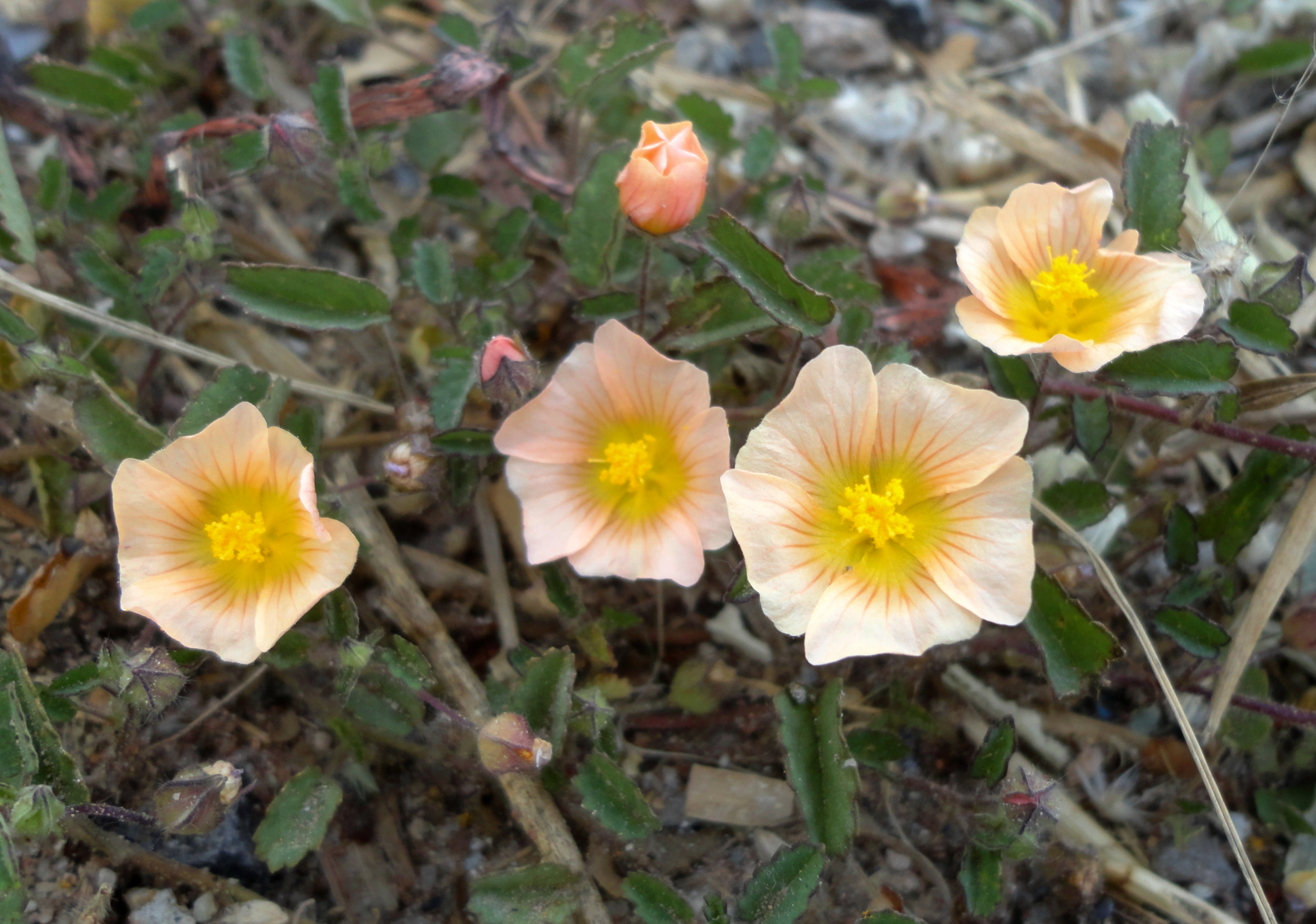
Sida abutifolia

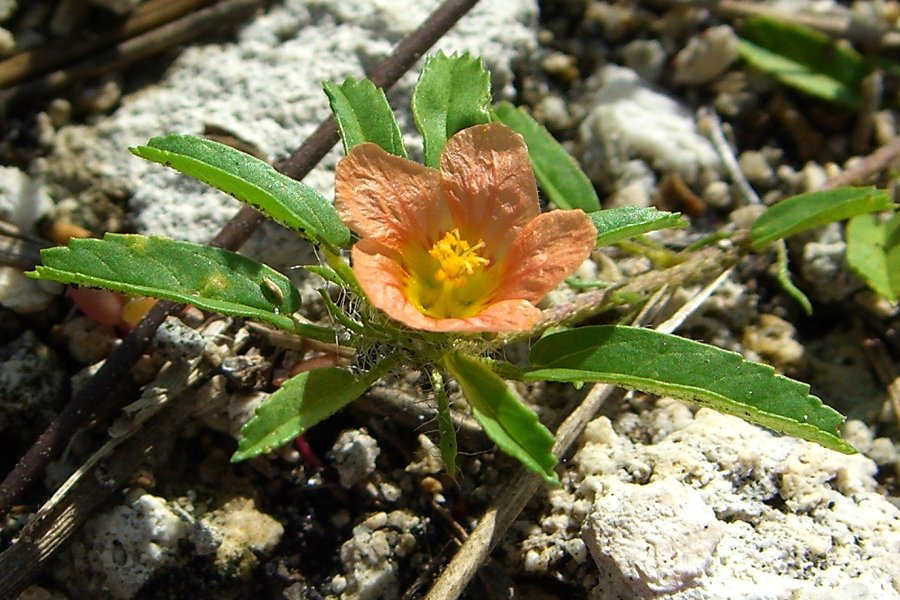
Sida ciliaris

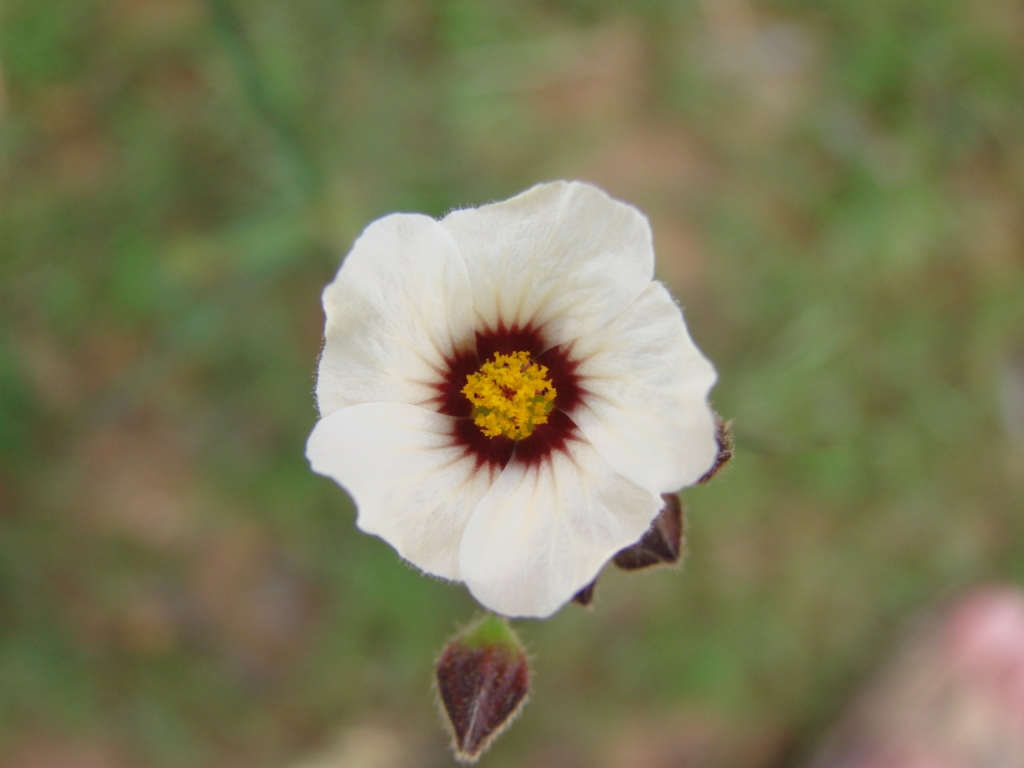
Sida linifolia

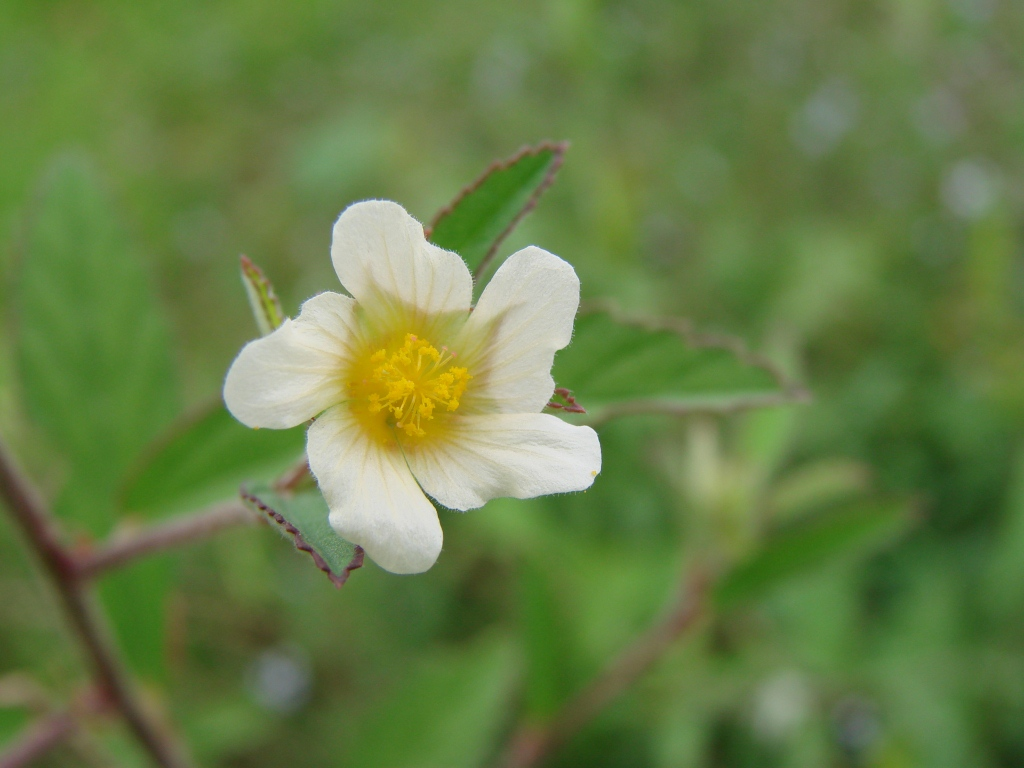
Sida rhombifolia

=== Selected species ===
Plants of the World Online accepts 275 species. They include:

- Sida abutifolia Mill. – prostrate sida, spreading fanpetals
- Sida acuta Burm.f. (syn. S. carpinifolia) – common wireweed, broomweed
- Sida aggregata C.Presl – savannah fanpetals
- Sida ammophila F.Muell. Sand sida
- Sida antillensis Urb. – Antilles fanpetals
- Sida calyxhymenia J.Gay ex DC. – rock sida, tall sida
- Sida cardiophylla (Benth.) F.Muell.
- Sida ciliaris L. – bracted fanpetals, fringed fanpetals
- Sida clementii Domin
- Sida cordata (Burm.f.) Borss.Waalk. – long-stalk sida, heartleaf fanpetals
- Sida cordifolia L. – country-mallow, flannel sida
- Sida corrugata Lindl. – corrugate sida
- Sida echinocarpa F.Muell.
- Sida elliottii Torr. & A.Gray – Elliott's fanpetals
- Sida fallax Walp. – ʻilima, yellow ʻilima
- Sida glabra Mill. – smooth fanpetals
- Sida glomerata Cav. – clustered fanpetals
- Sida hermaphrodita – Virginia fanpetals, river-mallow
- Sida intricata F.Muell. – twiggy sida
- Sida jamaicensis L. – Jamaican fanpetals
- Sida javensis Cav.
- Sida lindheimeri Engelm. & A.Gray – showy fanpetals
- Sida linifolia Juss. ex Cav. – flaxleaf fanpetals, balai grand
- Sida longipes A.Gray – stockflower fanpetals
- Sida mysorensis Wight & Arnott
- Sida neomexicana A.Gray – New Mexico fanpetals
- Sida nesogena I.M.Johnst.
- Sida petrophila F.Muell. – rock sida
- Sida phaeotricha F.Muell. – hill sida
- Sida picklesiana A.S.Markey, S.J.Dillon & R.M.Barker
- Sida pusilla Cav.
- Sida repens Dombey ex Cav. – Javanese fanpetals
- Sida rhombifolia L. – arrowleaf sida, Cuban jute
- Sida rubromarginata Nash – red-margin fanpetals
- Sida salviifolia C.Presl – escoba parada
- Sida santaremensis Monteiro – moth fanpetals
- Sida spenceriana F.Muell. F.Muell.
- Sida spinosa L. – prickly sida, prickly fanpetals
- Sida tragiifolia A.Gray – catnip noseburn, earleaf fanpetals
- Sida trichopoda F.Muell. F.Muell. – hairy sida
- Sida ulmifolia Mill. – common wireweed, common fanpetals
- Sida urens L. – tropical fanpetals, balai-zortie

=== Formerly placed here ===
Species now in other genera include:

- Abutilon abutiloides (Jacq.) Garcke ex Hochr. (as S. abutiloides Jacq. or S. lignosa Cav.)
- Abutilon cristata (L.) Schltdl. (as S. cristata L.)
- Abutilon giganteum (Jacq.) Sweet (as S. gigantea Jacq.)
- Abutilon grandifolium (Willd.) Sweet (as S. grandifolia Willd. or S. mollis Ortega)
- Abutilon hirtum (Lam.) Sweet (as S. graveolens Roxb. ex Hornem.)
- Abutilon incanum (Link) Sweet (as S. incana Link)
- Abutilon indicum (L.) Sweet (as S. indica L.)
- Abutilon megapotamicum (A.Spreng.) A.St.-Hil. & Naudin (as S. megapotamica A.Spreng.)
- Abutilon mollissimum (Cav.) Sweet Sida mollicoma Willd. (as S. mollissima Cav.)
- Abutilon pictum (Gillies ex Hook. & Arn.) Walp. (as S. picta Gillies ex Hook. & Arn.)
- Abutilon reflexum (Juss. ex Cav.) Sweet (as S. reflexa Juss. ex Cav.)
- Abutilon sellowianum (Klotzsch) Regel (as S. sellowiana Klotzsch)
- Abutilon theophrasti Medik. (as S. abutilon L.)
- Bakeridesia integerrima (Hook.) D.M.Bates (as S. integerrima Hook.)
- Corynabutilon vitifolium (Cav.) Kearney (as S. vitifolium Cav.)
- Malvastrum hispidum (Pursh) Hochr. (as S. hispida Pursh)
- Malvella leprosa (Ortega) Krapov. (as S. hederacea (Douglas) Torr. ex A.Gray)
- Nototriche compacta (Gay) A.W.Hill (as S. compacta Gay)
- Pavonia sepium A. St.-Hil. (as S. malvacea Vell.)
- Sidalcea malviflora (DC.) A.Gray ex Benth. (as S. malviflora DC.)
- Sidalcea oregana subsp. oregana (as S. oregana Nutt. ex Torr. & A.Gray)
- Sidastrum micranthum (A.St.-Hil.) Fryxell (as S. micrantha A.St.-Hil.)
- Sidastrum paniculatum (L.) Fryxell (as S. paniculata L.)
- Sphaeralcea grossulariifolia (Hook. & Arn.) Rydb. (as S. grossulariifolia Hook. & Arn.)
- Wissadula periplocifolia (L.) C.Presl ex Thwaites (as S. periplocifolia L.)
