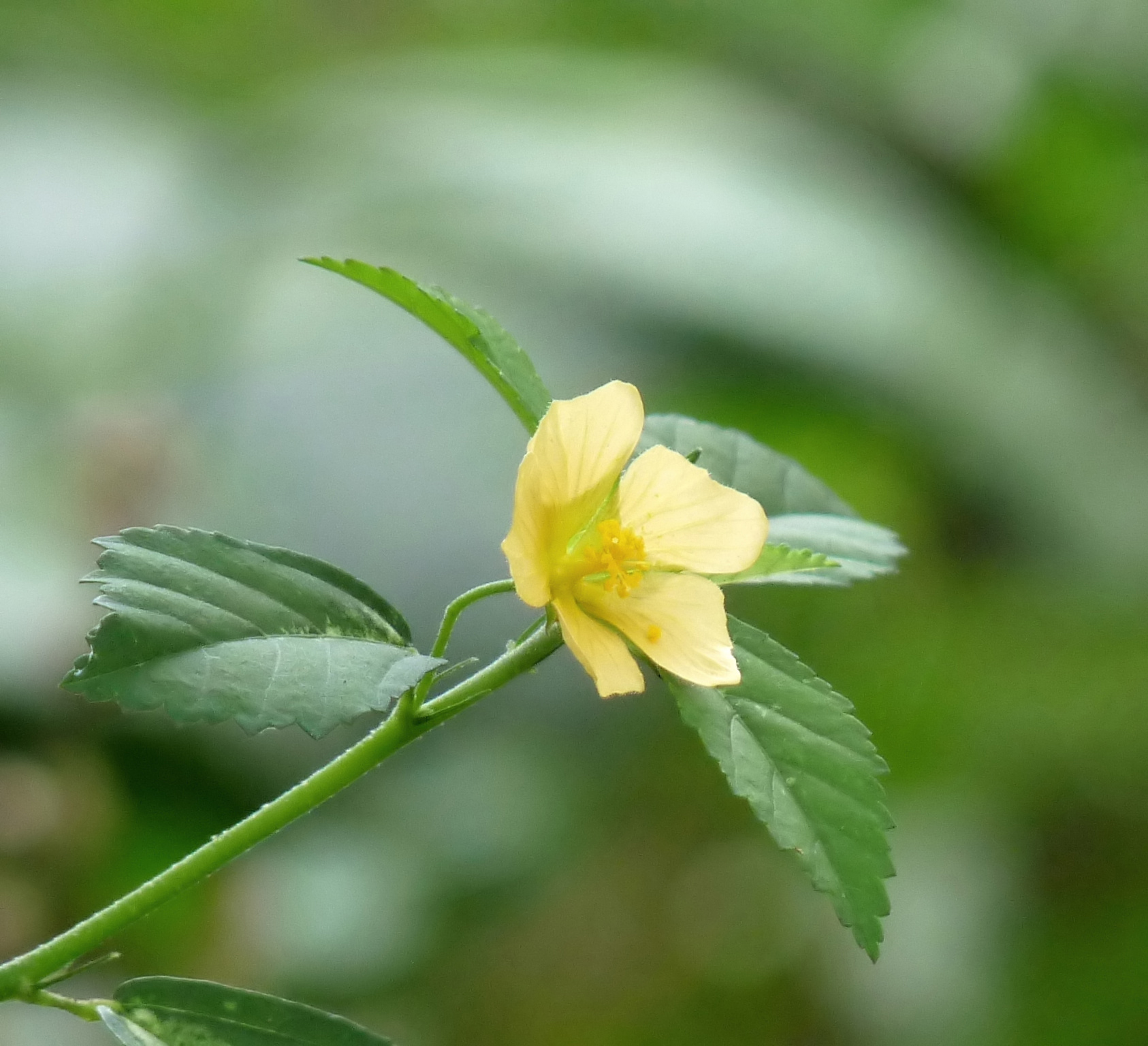

Scientific classification
- Kingdom: Plantae
- Clade: Tracheophytes
- Clade: Angiosperms
- Clade: Eudicots
- Clade: Rosids
- Order: Malvales
- Family: Malvaceae
- Genus: Sida
- Species: S. rhombifolia

Binomial name
- Sida rhombifolia L.

= Sida rhombifolia =

Species of flowering plant

Sida rhombifolia, commonly known as arrowleaf sida, is a perennial or sometimes annual plant in the family Malvaceae, native to the Old World tropics and subtropics. Other common names include rhombus-leaved sida, Paddy's lucerne, jelly leaf, and also somewhat confusingly as Cuban jute, Queensland-hemp, and Indian hemp (although S. rhombifolia is not closely related to either jute or hemp). Synonyms include Malva rhombifolia. It is used in Ayurvedic medicine, where it is known as kurumthotti.

== Description ==
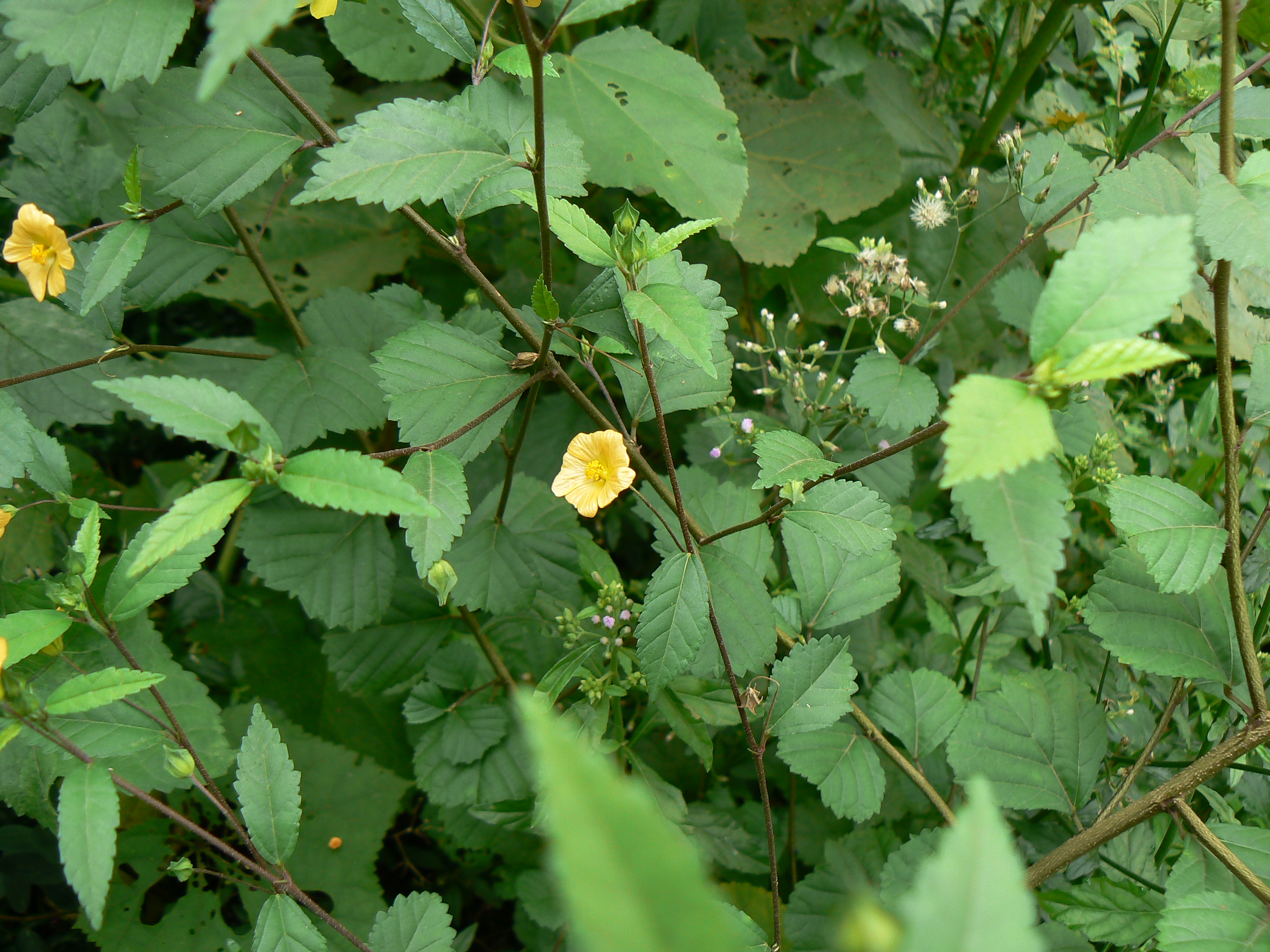
Sprawling bush

The stems are erect to sprawling and branched, growing 50 to 120 centimeters in height, with the lower sections being woody. The dark green, diamond-shaped leaves are arranged alternately along the stem, 4 to 8 centimeters long, with petioles that are less than a third of the length of the leaves. The leaves are paler below, with short, grayish hairs. The apical half of the leaves have toothed or serrated margins while the remainder of the leaves are smooth. The petioles have small spiny stipules at their bases.

=== Inflorescence ===
The moderately delicate flowers occur singly on flower stalks that arise from the area between the stems and leaf petioles. They consist of five petals that are 4 to 8 millimeters long, creamy to orange-yellow in color, and may be somewhat reddish in the center. Each of the five overlapping petals is asymmetric, having a long lobe on one side. The stamens unite in a short column. The fruit is a ribbed capsule, which breaks up into 8 to 10 segments. The plant blooms throughout the year.

== Distribution and habitat ==
Sida rhombifolia is native to tropical and subtropical areas of Africa through India and southeast Asia to Japan, as well as Indonesia and the Philippines. It has been introduced to tropical and subtropical parts of both north and south America, Australia, islands of the Pacific, and some parts of Europe. This species is usually confined to waste ground, such as roadsides and rocky areas, stock camps or rabbit warrens, but can be competitive in pasture, because of its unpalatability to livestock. It grows on savannahs, roadsides, thick scrub, hillsides, and swampy woodlands. It is such a tropical species that it is located below 2,000 meters above sea level.

== Uses ==
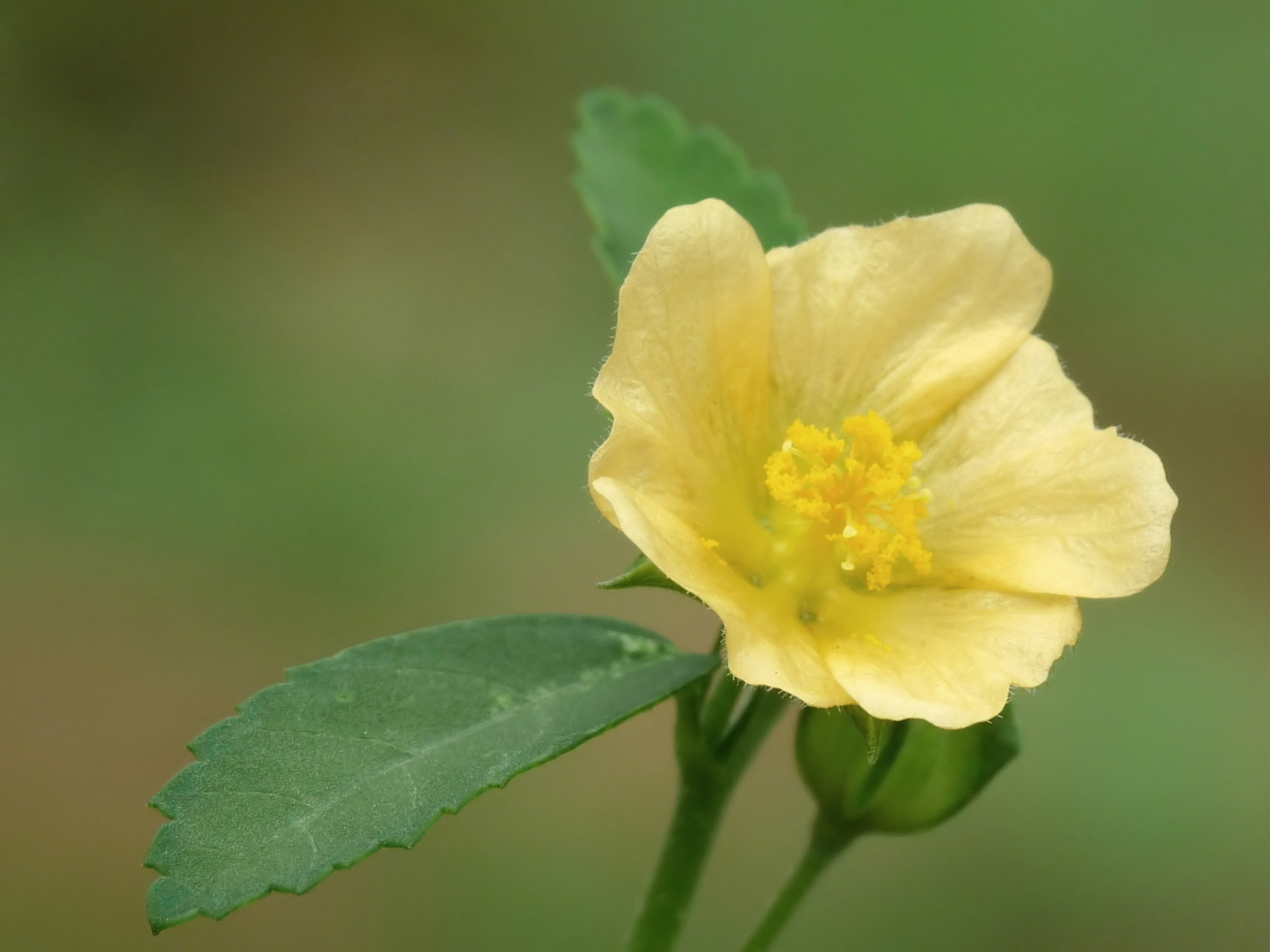
Sida rhombifolia flower, in Kerala

Arrowleaf sida stems are used as rough cordage, sacking, and for making brooms. The stems have a high quality fiber and were once exported from India and elsewhere as “hemp” (Guzmán 1975, Holm and others 1997). Chemical analysis revealed that the leaves contain respectable amounts of nutrients: 74,000 to 347,000 ppm protein, 94,000 to 475,000 ppm carbohydrates, 33,000 to 167,000 ppm fiber, 14,000 to 71,000 ppm fat, and 16,000 to 81,000 ppm ash. However, it was reported that the root contained 450 ppm alkaloids and the presence of ephedrine and saponin (Southwest School of Botanical Medicine 2002). Another source reports an alkaloid content in the root of 0.1 percent and the presence of choline, pseudoephedrine, beta-phenethylamine, vascin, hipaphorine and related indole alkaloids (Shaman Australis Ethnobotanicals 2002). Perhaps because of these chemicals, arrowleaf sida is unpalatable to cattle (Kuniata and Rapp 2001). Arrowleaf sida has significant medicinal applications for which it is cultivated throughout India. The pounded leaves are used to relieve swelling, the fruits are used to relieve headache, the mucilage is used as an emollient, and the root is used to treat rheumatism (Parrotta 2001). Leaves are smoked in Mexico and a tea is prepared in India for the stimulation it provides (Shaman Australis Ethnobotanicals 2002).

== See also ==
- Walissima
