= A. antiqua =

A. antiqua may refer to:

- Acanthocladia antiqua, a species of fossil bryozoan in the order Fenestrida
- Actia antiqua, a species of fly
- Agathammina antiqua, a species of fossil foramniferan in the family Hemigordiopsidae
- Agathistoma antiqua, a species of fossil sea snail in the genus Agathistoma
- Agrocholorta antiqua, a species of moth in the tribe Xylenini
- Allodia antiqua, a species of fly in the genus Allodia
- Alpillina antiqua, a species of fossil foramniferan in the class Globothalamea
- Amastra antiqua, a species of land snail
- Ameghinomya antiqua, a species of clam in the family Veneridae
- Amplovalvata antiqua, a species of fossil snail in the family Valvatidae
- Andrussowiella antiqua, a species of fossil snail in the family Hydrobiidae
- Anilara antiqua, a species of jewel beetle in the genus Anilara
- Anomala antiqua, a species of chafer beetle in the genus Anomala
- Aphaenogaster antiqua, a species of fossil ant in the genus Aphaenogaster
- Aquilofusus antiqua, a species of fossil snail in the family Fasciolariidae
- Aracajuia antiqua, a species of fossil ostracod in the family Cytheridae
- Archierato antiqua, a species of fossil snail in the genus Archierato
- Arctorthezia antiqua, a species of fossil scale insect in the family Arctorthezia
- Ascalenia antiqua, a species of moth
- Ashokia antiqua, a species of fossil sirenian in the family Protosirenidae
- Asterigerina antiqua, a species of fossil foramniferan in the superfamily Asterigerinoidea
- Astroviella antiqua, a species of fossil bryozoan in the order Trepostomatida
- Australohyaena antiqua, a species of fossil mammal
