= A. darwini =

A. darwini may refer to:

- Acarterus darwini
- Actia darwini, a tachinid fly species
- Amasa darwini
- Amblyomma darwini
- Anastatus darwini
- Anaulacomera darwini
- Aniksosaurus darwini, a dinosaur species from what is now Chubut Province, Argentina
- Aprostocetus darwini
- Apteronemobius darwini
- Atropos darwini, a synonym for Trimeresurus strigatus, a venomous pitviper species found in southern India

== See also ==
- A. darwinii (disambiguation)
- Darwini (disambiguation)
