= A. nigra =

A. nigra may refer to:

- Actia nigra, a tachinid fly species
- Aculeola nigra, the hooktooth dogfish, a small, little known dogfish, the only member of the genus Aculeola
- Alpinia nigra, an herb in the ginger family
- Arkoola nigra, a fungus plant pathogen species
- Astrapia nigra, the Arfak Astrapia, a large black bird of paradise species

== See also ==
- Nigra (disambiguation)
