= A. darwinii =

A. darwinii may refer to:

- Abutilon darwinii, a shrub native to Brazil
- Acmella darwinii
- Alleloplasis darwinii
- Amphisbaena darwinii, the Darwin's worm lizard, a species of limbless lizard
- Arcoscalpellum darwinii
- Asteromphalus darwinii

== See also ==
- A. darwini (disambiguation)
- Darwinii (disambiguation)
