= Mitchelton State School =

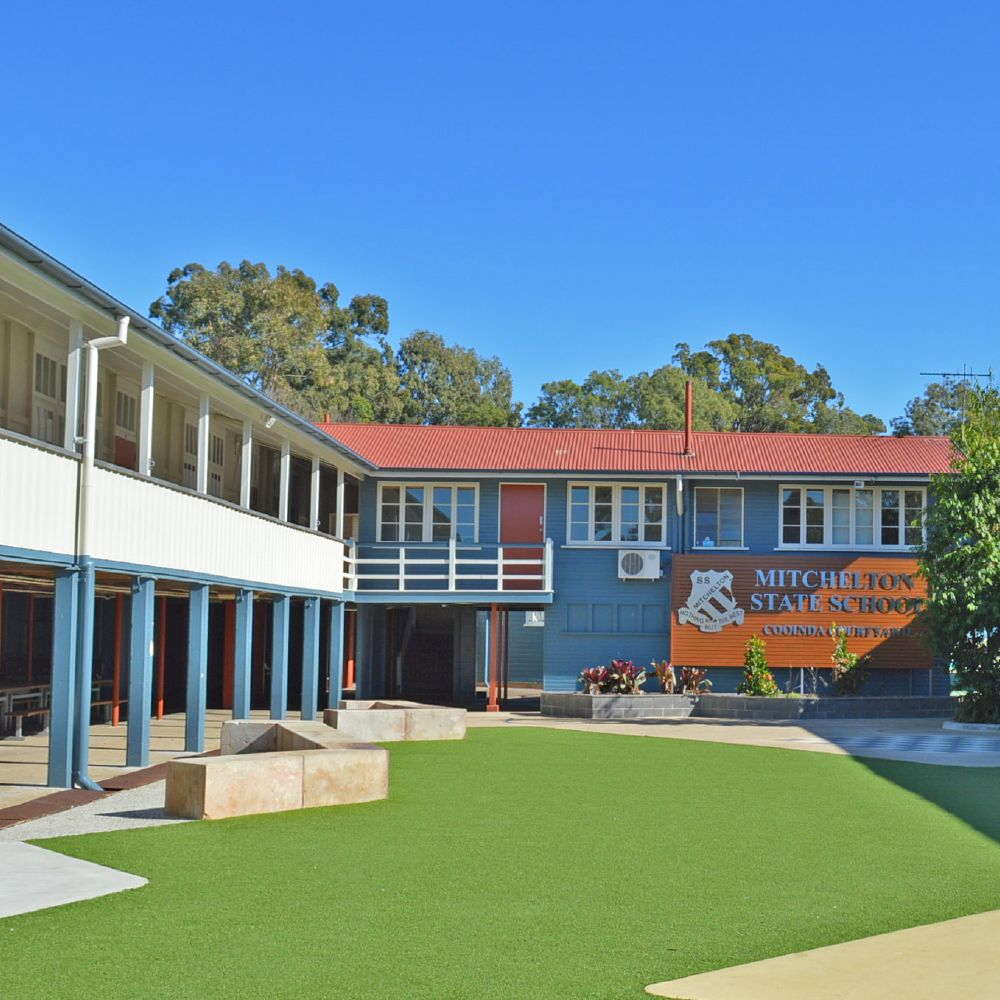
- Blocks B–C and Administration Wing Courtyard, from E, 2018

- Location within Queensland
- 27.4127°S 152.9689°E
- Location: 47 Glen Retreat Road, Mitchelton, City of Brisbane, Queensland, Australia

History
- Design period: 1940s–1960s (Post-WWII)
- Built: 1950–1960, 1952–1954, Block C (Highset Timber School Building with semi–enclosed stair) (1952, 1952–1959, 1952, 1952, 1953–1954, Block A (Boulton & Paul Building) (1953, extended 1954), 1957, 1958–1959, (Highset Timber School Building with semi–enclosed stair) (1958

Site notes
- Architect(s): Boulton & Paul Ltd; Department of Public Works (Queensland)

Queensland Heritage Register
- Official name: Mitchelton State School
- Type: state heritage
- Designated: 23 August 2018
- Reference no.: 650063
- Type: Education, Research, Scientific Facility: School – state (primary); Education, research, scientific facility: School-state
- Theme: Educating Queenslanders: Providing primary schooling

Mitchelton State School is a heritage-listed state school and state school at 47 Glen Retreat Road, Mitchelton, City of Brisbane, Queensland, Australia. It was designed by Boulton & Paul, Ltd and Department of Public Works (Queensland) and built from 1950 to 1960. It was added to the Queensland Heritage Register on 23 August 2018.

== History ==
Mitchelton State School opened in 1916 as Groveley State School. Located approximately 8.5 km northwest from the Brisbane CBD, the school (Years 3–8) moved to its current site in 1952, while the infants school (Years 1–2) remained at the former site until 1986. The school comprises an early 1950s master-planned school site with asymmetrical placement of buildings. Six buildings from the original planning scheme remain:

- a Boulton & Paul Prefabricated Timber Building – Block A (1953, extended 1954, and 1970)
- Highset Timber School Buildings with semi-enclosed stair – Blocks B (1952), C (1952, extended c. 1954), D (1958, extended 1959) and E (1957)
- a timber Administration Bridging Wing (1952, extended 1970) connecting Blocks B and C

and connecting walkways between buildings. The buildings are set in landscaped grounds with mature trees, assembly and play areas, and sporting facilities. The school has a strong and ongoing association with the Mitchelton community.

Originally part of the lands of the Turrbal people, the future site of Mitchelton State School was sold by the Queensland Government in May 1864. A farming community developed in the Mitchelton-Keperra area, which featured vineyards and wineries.

The establishment of schools was considered an essential step in the development of new communities and integral to their success. Schools became a community focus, a symbol of progress, and a source of pride, with enduring connections formed with past pupils, parents, and teachers. Groveley State School, established for the children of the surrounding farming community, opened on 9 October 1916 on a 2-acre (0.81ha) site purchased from Sarah Jane Keylar and located on Samford Road, north of the current school site.

Although intended for transportation of dairy and farm produce, the opening of the railway line extension linking Gaythorne to Mitchelton (on the Dayboro branch railway line, now Ferny Grove line) on 2 March 1918, stimulated subdivision of farming land for housing. The first of these interwar housing estates, on sale from May 1918, was stage one of the Groveley Lodge Estate, adjacent to the Groveley State School.

Groveley State School was renamed Mitchelton State School in 1923. The population of the school grew due to housing development in Mitchelton, and a larger school site became necessary. In 1935 the Department of Education resumed about 6.5 acres (2.63ha) south of the school, for this purpose. This land on Glen Retreat Road was reserved as R1426 in 1937. Plans were prepared for the new school site, however, it did not move until 15 years later.

The outbreak of the War in the Pacific in December 1941 affected Queensland schools. The Queensland Government closed all coastal state schools in January 1942, and although most schools reopened on 2 March 1942, student attendance was optional until the war ended. Typically, schools were a focus for civilian duty during wartime. At many schools, students and staff members grew produce and flowers for donation to local hospitals and organised fundraising and the donation of useful items to Australian soldiers on active service. This was the case at Mitchelton State School.

After World War II, the Department of Public Instruction was largely unprepared for the enormous demand for state education that began in the late 1940s and continued well into the 1960s. This was a nation-wide occurrence resulting from immigration and the unprecedented population growth now termed the "baby boom". Queensland schools were overcrowded and to cope, many new buildings were constructed and existing buildings were extended. The overriding concern for the Department of Public Instruction, faced with overcrowding and a lack of resources, was the need to build school buildings as expeditiously and economically as possible.

The population of Mitchelton and its adjacent suburb, Keperra, doubled between 1947 and 1954 and this was reflected in the growth of Mitchelton State School's enrolments. Pupil numbers increased from 331 in 1939 to 657 in October 1950. Temporary classrooms were added in 1947 and 1949, but overcrowding continued. The community requested that work on the new school for Mitchelton commence and in 1951, the Department of Public Works announced it would build six classrooms on the new Mitchelton State School site.

Post-war, the Department of Public Instruction focused on more appropriate siting of new schools within their neighbourhoods, as well as site planning for expansion and ideal solar orientation. In the early 1950s, Department of Public Works (DPW) architects developed master planning concepts that influenced the design and layout of the whole school. Initially, these plans were broadly based on regular and symmetrical plan forms around a central or prominent axis. Educationalists argued that the ideal orientation of classroom buildings was 10 degrees east of north, with verandahs protecting the northern side and classrooms facing south. This led to the construction of school buildings that were oriented in relation to the sun rather than the site boundaries. The original positioning of Mitchelton State School's buildings, with three parallel connected wings orientated this way to the sun, are evidence of these planning considerations.

The DPW introduced and developed new standard plans for school buildings from 1950. These buildings were high-set timber-framed structures with the understorey used as covered play space. Introduced in 1950, the principal type, the Highset Timber School Building with semi-enclosed stair, was a long and narrow building with a gable roof. The stair connected the understorey to a north-facing verandah running the length of the building. Classrooms opened off the verandah and had extensive areas of windows; almost the entirety of the verandah wall and the opposite classroom wall were glazed, allowing abundant natural light and ventilation. This building type was the most commonly constructed in the 1950s in Queensland. Plans for the first buildings of the new Mitchelton State School - Blocks B and C (both of this type) and a Administration Bridging Wing - were drawn in September and October 1951 and built in time for commencement of the 1952 school year.

Block B had a north-facing verandah and classrooms on the upper level, with open space on the ground level providing a covered play area for students. The southern side had large areas of casement windows with fanlights, while the northern verandah wall had double doors with glazed panels and double-hung windows with fanlights. The classrooms were 21 ft wide (6.4m) and separated by timber partitions, some with large folding doors to combine classrooms and some with central double doors. The partition layout incorporated narrow hat rooms between classrooms. The building was supported on timber stumps with short timber bracing walls. The ground floor was only partially concreted and there was a lavatory at the western end. The verandah stair at the western end was partially enclosed with glazing. Verandah balustrades were timber rails.

Built to the north and parallel to Block B, Block C was almost a duplicate of Block B but with variations to the verandah stair at the western end and it lacked the eastern-most classroom.

The Administration Bridging Wing, comprising a raised and covered walkway, linked Blocks B and C at their western ends. It was enclosed along most of its western side and had high-level windows. Opening off the eastern side were the Head Teacher's office, medical inspection room, female staff room, and toilet. The Head Teacher's office opened through double doors onto a small, east-facing balcony. Contemporary drawings of the buildings show a flagpole near this balcony and the area between the buildings labelled "ASSEMBLY AREA".

On 29 January 1952, the Year 3–8 students commenced the school year at the new 3.2ha site, while the renamed Mitchelton State Infant School (Years 1–2) remained at the previous school site. The cost of building the new school was £22,580.

Responding to materials shortages and the enrolment pressures of the baby boom, the Department of Public Works proceeded in 1953 with the proposed future wing (Block A) shown on the original plans, which was sited to the south of Block B and connected by a covered walkway. Comprising three classrooms, this wing was a pre-fabricated building system imported from British manufacturers Boulton & Paul Ltd of Norwich. These buildings were erected at many schools across Queensland between 1951 and 1958.

Boulton & Paul buildings were timber-framed and -clad, had verandahs for circulation, and a gable roofs. Ideally, they were oriented so the verandah faced north and the classrooms faced south, but they were also added as extensions to existing buildings regardless of orientation. The building could be high or low-set and had extensive areas of timber framed awning windows, providing more glazing than had ever been used in Queensland classrooms. Almost the entirety of the verandah wall and the opposite classroom wall were glazed. Natural ventilation and lighting was abundant. The classroom size of 24 ft x 24 ft (7.3m x 7.3m) was larger than most previous classrooms.

Mitchelton State School's Boulton & Paul building was extended in 1954 by three DPW-designed classrooms to its east and one Boulton & Paul classroom to its west. North of the western classroom, an extension was built for use as a library. Block C was extended by one classroom to its east by 1954.

Another Highset Timber School building with enclosed stair, Block E, was constructed in 1957, to the west of Block C, to which it was connected by a short, raised walkway. The building faced more to the east than previous buildings. It had a northern verandah on the upper level, was clad with chamfer boards, and had a gable roof. Two of its classrooms, which were 21 ft (6.4m) wide, were separated from each other by large folding doors. The verandah had a balustrade of bag and hat racks, and the stair at the eastern end was enclosed by a glazed screen. The walkway between the buildings was steel-framed with v-shaped columns, fabricated from steel pipe, and wire mesh balustrades. Underneath was open play space for pupils.

Similarly, Block D, also a highset, timber building, was built to the west of Block B, to which it was connected by a raised walkway. Parallel to Block E, it was clad with chamfer boards, and had a gable roof. The building was mostly enclosed around the perimeter underneath for students' play space and had a northern verandah and classrooms on the upper level. The southern side had large areas of hopper windows and the northern verandah wall had double doors and double-hung windows with fanlights. The verandah had a balustrade of bag and hat racks and the stairs were partially enclosed with glazed panels. The classrooms, which were 21 ft (6.4m) wide, were divided from each other by a timber partition which had a connecting door at the southern end. A western extension to Block D, of two classrooms, was completed by September 1959.

An important component of Queensland state schools was their grounds. The early and continuing commitment to play-based education, particularly in primary school, resulted in the provision of outdoor play space and sporting facilities, such as ovals and tennis courts. Also, trees and gardens were planted to shade and beautify schools. For planting on Arbor Day in May 1957, the Head Teacher, William Grant, ordered four Weeping Figs, three purple Bauhinia (Bauhinia purpurea) and two leopard trees (Flindersia maculosa). In 1960, aerial photography showed evidence of a planting scheme on the Mitchelton State School site, along the Mimosa Street and Glen Retreat Road boundaries, as well as the retention of mature trees northeast of Block C. The school playing field and two tennis courts were formed by May 1958. The swimming pool and associated dressing shed were erected by 1964.

In the 1970s, plans for a number of alterations to the 1950s buildings were drawn; the resultant changes are not considered to be of state heritage significance. An extension to Block A, comprising one classroom on its eastern end, was constructed after September 1970 and completed by May 1971. An extension to Block D to its east, along its connecting walkway, was drawn for a female staff room. Plans were also drawn for alterations to partitions, and door and window locations in the Administration Bridging Wing. In 1973, the Administration Bridging Wing was extended to the west of its corridor to provide accommodation for administration, with removal of a partition installed in 1970. Plans for an addition to the administration area between Blocks C and B were drawn in August 1974. In 1975, the Administration Bridging Wing was further altered to extend an office to the northwest side for the Senior and Infant Mistresses. In 1976 Block D was extended for a tea room and the Administration Bridging Wing was altered, with an extension to the sick room to the east and the Health Services room to the west.

The 1970s also brought additional buildings to the site. A two-storey classroom block (Block F, south of Block D) and an Administration Block (adjacent to Glen Retreat Road) were constructed by 1975. These are not considered to be of state heritage significance.

In 1986, Mitchelton State School and Mitchelton Infants School were combined on the present state school site.

In 1998, alterations were made to Blocks B and A. Demolition of internal partitions, removal of glazing and construction of two partitions in new positions, with concertina doors, took place in Block B. In Block A, there was demolition of internal partitions and the verandah wall of the 1970s classroom and enclosure of that classroom's verandah, removal and replacement of doors, and removal of glazing.

Mitchelton State School became one of Queensland's first Independent Public Schools in November 2013. In 2016 it celebrated its centenary anniversary, by publishing a history of the school, and bringing together staff, students, parents and community members who contributed to Mitchelton State School during its first century.

In 2018, the school continues to operate from its 1950s site. It retains a Boulton & Paul Prefabricated Timber Building with additions; four Highset Timber School Buildings with semi-enclosed stairs; a timber Administration Bridging Wing; and connecting walkways, set in landscaped grounds with assembly and play areas, sporting facilities, retaining walls and mature shade trees from the 1950s planting scheme. Mitchelton State School is important to Mitchelton, as a key social focus for the community, as generations of students have been taught there and many social events held in the school's grounds and buildings since its establishment.

== Description ==
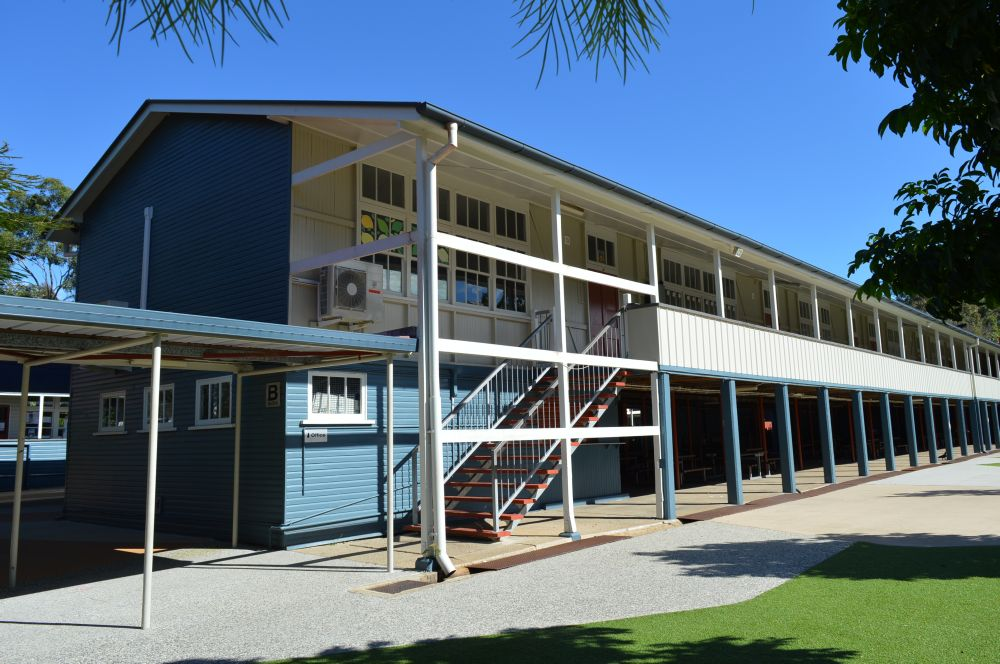
Block B, from the north-east, 2018

Mitchelton State School occupies a 3.19ha site in Mitchelton, a suburb approximately 8.5 km northwest of Brisbane CBD. The school is accessed via Glen Retreat Road to the southeast, and is bounded on other sides by Mimosa Street (northeast), Turnbull Street (northwest) and a creek (southwest). The school retains a complex of five highset buildings with a highset Administration Bridging Wing, located at the south end of the site and connected by covered walkways. The grounds are well-established and include a northern playing field and northeastern tennis courts.

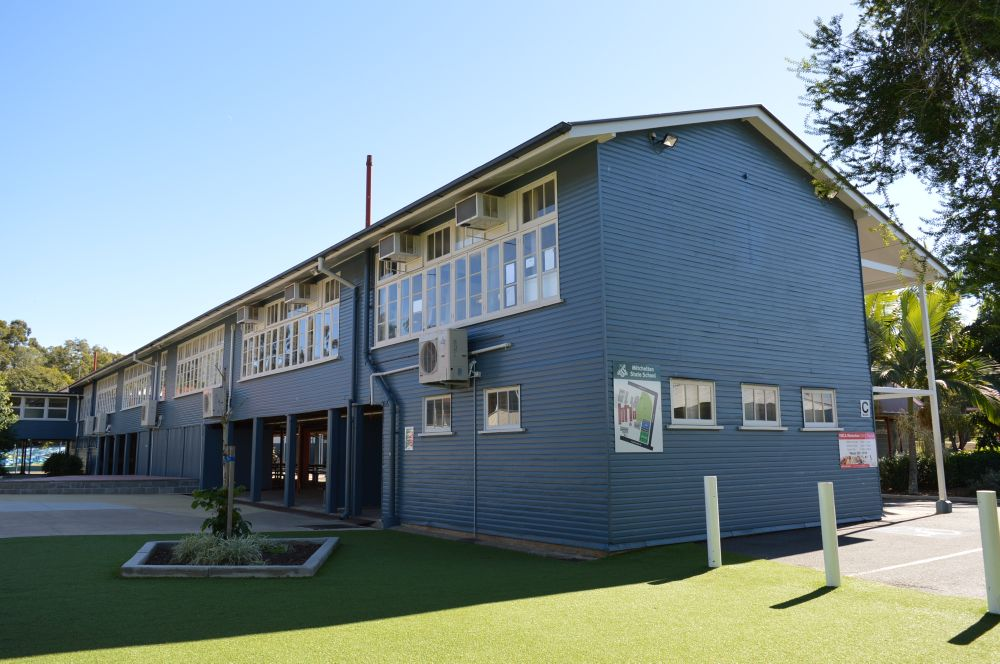
Block C, from the south-east, 2018

The features of state-level cultural heritage significance within the school complex are:

- Block B – a 1952 Highset Timber School Building with semi-enclosed stair.
- Block C – a 1952 (extended 1954) Highset Timber School Building with semi-enclosed stair.
- Administration Bridging Wing - a 1952 wing connecting Blocks B and C.
- Block A – a 1953 (extended 1954) Boulton & Paul Building; with a 1954 Department of Public Works (DPW) extension.
- Block E – a 1957 Highset Timber School Building with semi-enclosed stair.
- Block D – a 1958 (extended 1959) Highset Timber School Building with semi-enclosed stair.
- 1950s site planning, including covered walkways and courtyards.
- landscape features – playing field and mature trees.

The site planning is typical of Queensland schools from the 1950s; with the long, narrow buildings linked by covered walkways and surrounded by open-ended courtyard play spaces. Blocks A (south), B (central) and C (north) are arranged in a staggered, parallel formation, orientated slightly east of north with north-facing verandahs. Blocks D and E (orientated further toward the east, with northeast-facing verandahs) are connected to the western ends of Blocks B and C, and are in parallel alignment.

=== Highset Timber School Buildings with semi-enclosed stairs ===
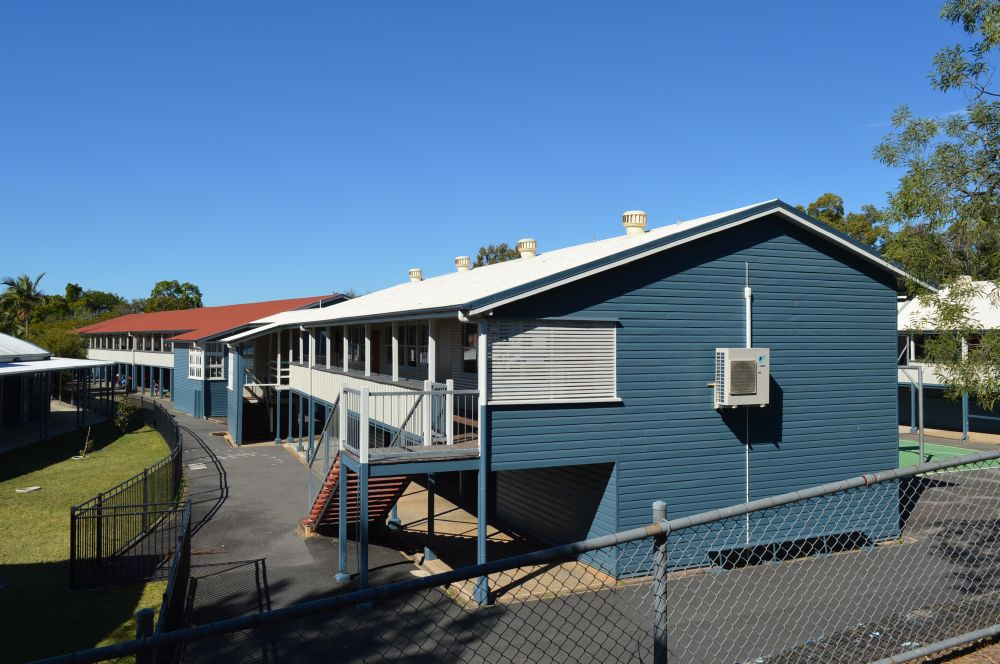
Block E, from the north-west, 2018

Blocks B, C, D and E are long, highset, timber-framed teaching buildings with gable roofs. The buildings have north-facing verandahs (Blocks D and E orientated further east than Blocks B and C), accessing southern classrooms. Stairs at the east and west ends of the verandahs (except the west end of Block D, which was relocated and replaced with a smaller stair with the 1958 extension) are semi-enclosed with timber-framed screens and fixed windows.

The interior layouts of the buildings are as follows:

- Blocks B and C have similar interior layouts: two classrooms with a break-out area (formerly three classrooms), separated from three eastern classrooms by a central hat room (former). At the west end is a second hat room (former), and Block B extends further to the west with a teachers room and toilet.
  - An opening (recent) in the east wall of Block C's central hat room extends the adjacent classroom space.
  - The classroom east of Block B's central hat room is divided by recent lightweight partitions (not of state-level cultural heritage significance).
- Block D: three eastern class / staff-rooms (1957, formerly three classrooms and a hat room), and a west classroom (1959). The easternmost room is an eastern extension of the former hat room.
- Block E: two classrooms (formerly three), with a hat room (former) at the east end.

The understoreys are used as play space.

Features of state-level cultural heritage significance also include:

- corrugated metal roof cladding.
- timber chamferboard exterior wall cladding, including stair enclosures and sections of understorey enclosures.
- interior wall linings of VJ timber (Blocks B and C) and flat sheets with D-moulded and square cover-strips (Blocks D and E).
- early flat sheet ceiling linings with D-moulded and square cover strips.
- simple timber skirtings.
- verandah finishes: flat sheet-lined ceilings with cover-strips; timber flooring; exposed timber stud framing (Blocks B and C) and timber chamferboard cladding (Blocks D and E) to the verandah wall; and square timber posts.
- bag racks forming verandah balustrades.
- external timber stairs with timber post-and-rail balustrades.
- early timber joinery: large banks of casement windows (south walls of Blocks B and C), double-hung windows (verandah walls); top-hinged awning fanlights; louvres (understoreys and Block B); panelled doors; and internal French doors.
- original door and window openings.
- Diagonal-boarded bracing walls (understoreys).
- understorey concrete floors.
- timber bench seats (understorey of Block E).

=== Administration Bridging Wing (1952) ===
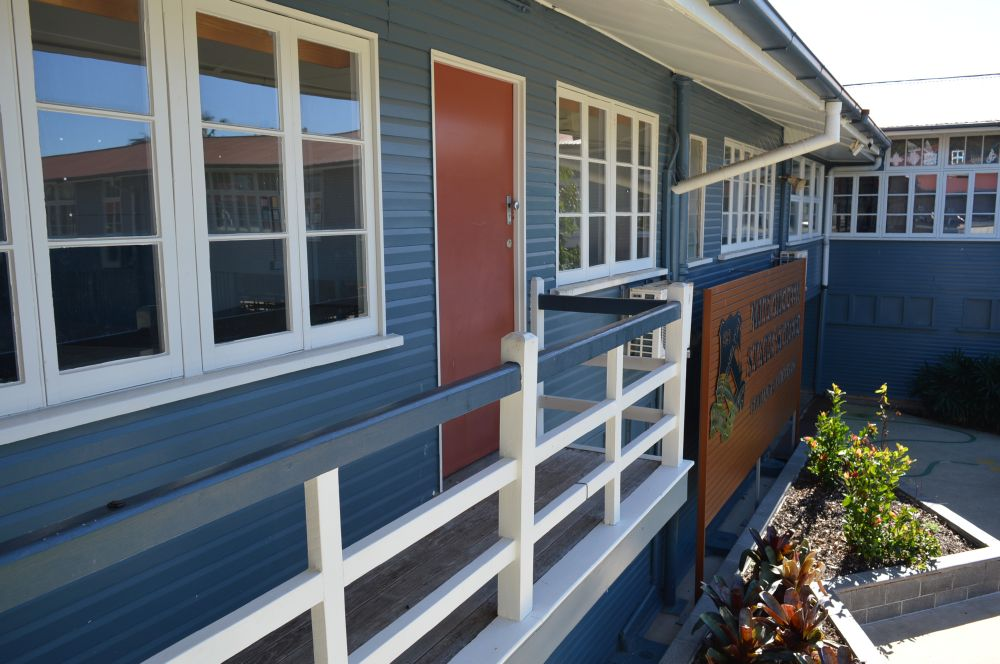
Administration wing, from south-east, 2018

The Administration Bridging Wing is a highset, timber-framed office building with a skillion roof. A central walkway provides access to the offices and connects Blocks B and C. The southeast end is the earliest and most significant section, comprising two office spaces (formerly three), with an entryway and toilet.

Features of state-level cultural heritage significance also include:

- timber chamferboard wall cladding.
- corrugated metal roof cladding.
- interior wall and ceiling linings of flat sheeting with D-moulded cover-strips.
- early timber joinery: casement windows (east wall), fixed windows with obscured glazing, and 6-light French doors.

=== Block A: Boulton & Paul (1953, extended 1954) ===
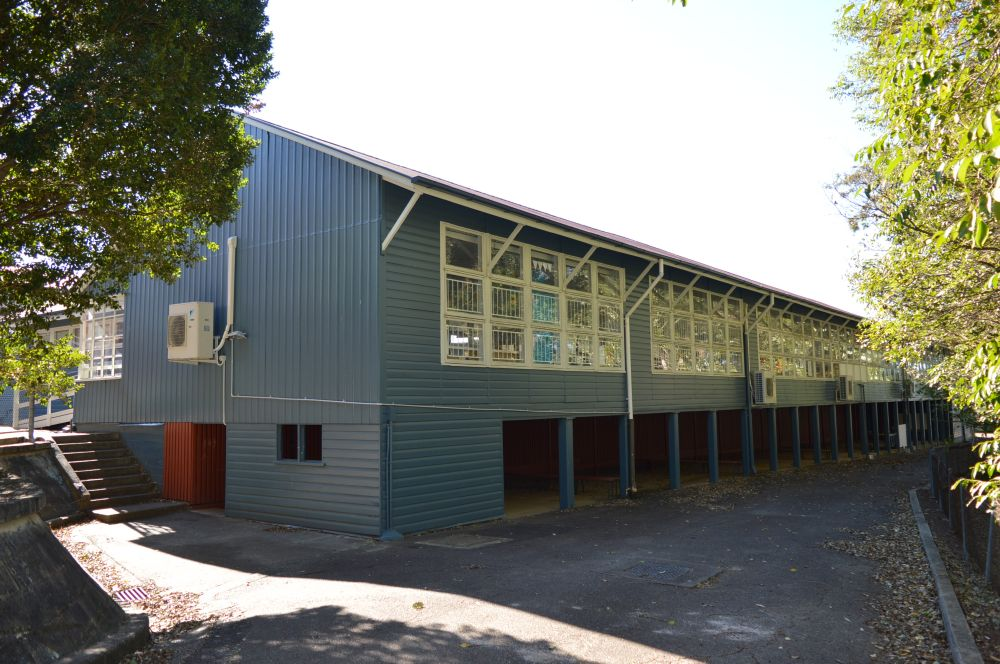
Block A, from the south-west, 2018

Block A is a long, timber-framed, prefabricated teaching building with a gable roof and long sides facing north and south. Standing on piers, the building is almost level with the ground on the north side, but is highset to the south (due to the sloping terrain). A northern verandah accesses a series of southern classrooms, and a single room (former library, 1954) extends north from its west end.

The west end of the building, comprising four classrooms, a break-out space and store room (formerly five classrooms and a hat room - the west classroom is an early addition), is of a prefabricated Boulton and Paul design. The east end, comprising two classrooms and a break-out space (formerly three classrooms) is of a similar DPW design. The easternmost classroom (1971) is a later addition. Some partitions have been removed to reconfigure classroom sizes.

The gable-end walls extend to the understorey, and an early eastern enclosure forms an art room. A timber screen (1961) along the north length of the building, shields a rock-face.

Features also of state-level cultural heritage significance include:

- corrugated metal roof cladding.
- timber chamferboard exterior wall cladding, with profiled metal sheet cladding (west elevation).
- distinguishing Boulton & Paul features: vertical timber strips in chamferboard walls defining prefabricated wall panels; timber southern eaves brackets; timber fall-prevention safety rails along windows; and timber-framed fixed, glazed screen (west end of verandah).
- verandah finishes: flat sheet-lined ceilings (with square cover-strips to the Boulton & Paul section), timber flooring, and square timber posts.
- bag racks forming the verandah balustrade.
- external timber stairs with timber post-and-rail balustrades.
- concrete stair accessing understorey.
- early timber joinery: large banks of top-hinged awning windows (south wall), double-hung windows (north verandah wall and library); fanlights; centre-pivoting windows (library) half-glazed and panelled doors (verandah wall); VJ-lined door (understorey); and a glazed door with a timber frame and metal rails (to library).
- early door and window hardware, including metal stays to Boulton & Paul section.
- 24 ft (7.32m) wide classroom spaces.
- bulkheads, wall nibs and ceiling lining protrusions indicating the early layout.
- flat sheet interior wall and ceiling linings, with D-moulded cover strips.
- simple timber skirtings.
- flat sheet eaves linings.
- V-jointed (VJ) timber-lined and chamferboard-clad understorey enclosure (excluding the opening in the eastern wall).
- understorey concrete floor and timber bench seats.
- connecting walkway to Block B (see below).

=== Covered Walkways ===
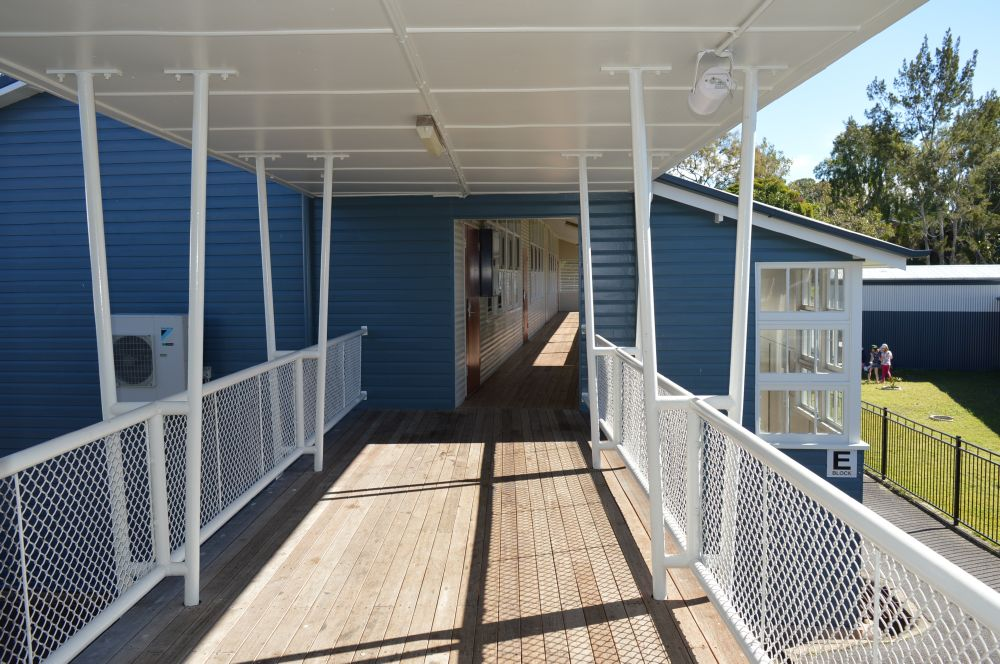
Connecting walkway from Block E to Block C, 2018

Raised, covered walkways connect the verandahs of Blocks B and D; and Blocks C and E. They have timber floors, corrugated metal-clad skillion roofs, balustrades of metal pipe and chain wire, and V-shaped circular metal posts.

A ground-level covered walkway extending between Blocks A and B has a corrugated metal-clad skillion roof and timber posts.

=== Courtyards ===
Open courtyards between Blocks A and B, B and C, and D and E, are characteristic of the 1950s planning. They are used as open play-space.

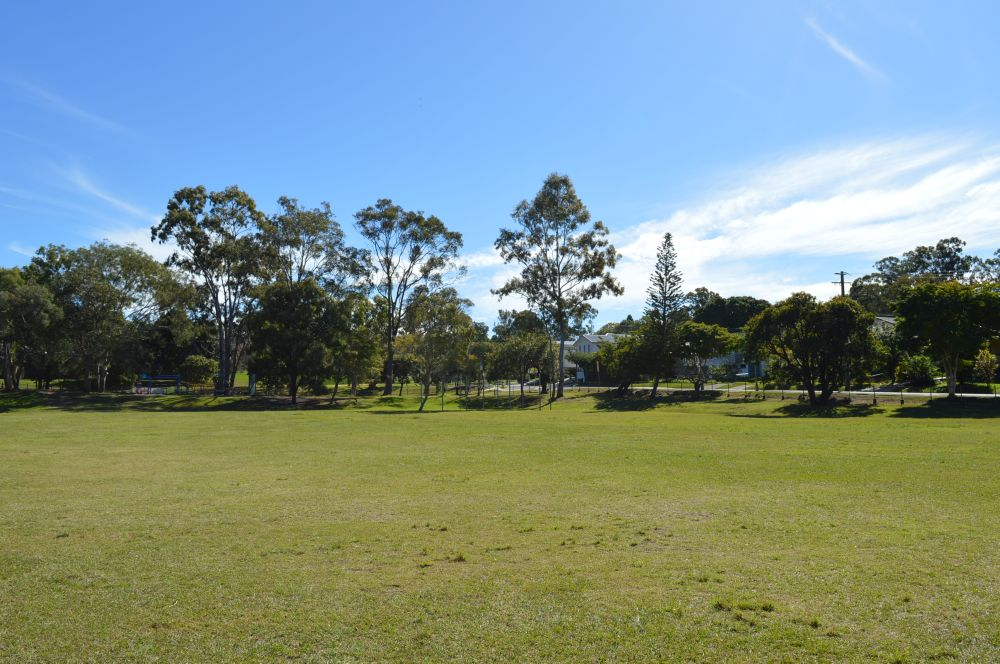
Playing field, from the south-east, 2018

=== Landscape Features ===
The school grounds are well-established, with sporting facilities including a large playing field at the northern end of the site.

Mature leopard trees (Flindersia maculosa) and a fig tree (Ficus sp.) stand either side of the Glen Retreat Road entrance. An additional mature leopard tree is between the playing field and Mimosa Street.

== Heritage listing ==
Mitchelton State School was listed on the Queensland Heritage Register on 23 August 2018 having satisfied the following criteria.

The place is important in demonstrating the evolution or pattern of Queensland's history.

Mitchelton State School (established 1916; on its current site from 1952) is important in demonstrating the evolution of state education and its associated architecture in Queensland. The place retains excellent, representative examples of standard government designs that were architectural responses to prevailing government educational philosophies, set in landscaped grounds with provision of assembly and play areas, sporting facilities and mature trees.

The layout of the administration and classroom blocks, the covered links between them and associated open spaces, reflect the early 1950s introduction of master planning, which provided for ordered growth from a nucleus.

The Boulton & Paul Building (1953, extended 1954) demonstrates the introduction and adoption of imported prefabricated systems by the Queensland Government in response to acute building material shortages and population growth in the post-World War II period.

The Highset Timber School Buildings with semi-enclosed stair (1952–59) with Administration Bridging Wing (1952) demonstrate the evolution of Department of Public Works designs during the 1950s, based on features of the Boulton & Paul buildings.

The place is important in demonstrating the principal characteristics of a particular class of cultural places.

Mitchelton State School is important in demonstrating the principal characteristics of a Queensland state school of the 1950s. These include its 1950s site planning; range of highset timber-framed buildings of standard designs; and a generous, landscaped site with shade trees, and assembly and sports areas.

The site planning is intact and important in demonstrating the principal characteristics of 1950s Queensland state school master planning, which provided for ordered growth from a nucleus. The five 1950s buildings at Mitchelton State School contribute to the concept of long, narrow buildings arranged in a staggered, parallel formation fanning out from an administration wing; linked by covered walkways around open-ended courtyard assembly and play spaces.

The highset timber teaching buildings (Blocks B, C, D and E, 1952–59) are good, intact examples of Highset Timber Teaching Buildings with semi-enclosed stairs, and retain their: highset character with covered play space under; timber-framed, lightweight construction; gable roofs; north-facing verandahs for circulation; large banks of south-facing timber-framed casement and awning windows, with fanlights; 24 ft (7.3m) wide classrooms; and stairwells semi-enclosed with timber frames and fixed windows.

The Boulton & Paul Building (Block A, 1953–54) is a good, intact example of this standard type. It is important in demonstrating the principal characteristics through its: expression of the modular, prefabricated construction in external cladding; timber-framed, lightweight construction; highset, gable-roofed form with play space underneath; northern verandah for circulation; 24 ft (7.3m) wide classrooms, flat internal wall linings; and large banks of timber-framed awning and double-hung windows with fall-prevention safety rails and window stays.

Influenced by the Boulton & Paul type, the DPW-designed extension (1954) is a good, intact example of its standard type, demonstrating the principal characteristics including its: timber-framed, lightweight construction; highset, gable-roofed form with play space underneath; northern verandah for circulation; 24 ft (7.3m) wide classrooms, flat internal wall linings; and large banks of timber-framed awning and double-hung windows to classrooms.

The place has a strong or special association with a particular community or cultural group for social, cultural or spiritual reasons.

Schools have always played an important part in Queensland communities. They typically retain significant and enduring connections with former pupils, parents, and teachers; provide a venue for social interaction and volunteer work; and are a source of pride, symbolising local progress and aspirations.

Mitchelton State School has a strong and ongoing association with the Mitchelton community. Established nearby in 1916 and relocated to its current site in 1952, generations of Mitchelton students have been taught at the school. The place is important for its contribution to the educational development of Mitchelton and as a focus for the community.
