= Actia tarsata =

Scientific classification
- Kingdom: Animalia
- Phylum: Arthropoda
- Clade: Pancrustacea
- Class: Insecta
- Order: Diptera
- Family: Tachinidae
- Genus: Actia
- Species: A. tarsata

Binomial name
- Actia tarsata Richter, 1980

Species of fly

Actia tarsata is an eastern Palearctic species of fly in the family Tachinidae.

== Distribution ==
Chita in Eastern Siberia.
