= Actia pokharana =

Scientific classification
- Kingdom: Animalia
- Phylum: Arthropoda
- Class: Insecta
- Order: Diptera
- Family: Tachinidae
- Genus: Actia
- Species: A. pokharana

Binomial name
- Actia pokharana Shima, 1970

Species of fly

Actia pokharana is a species of tachinid flies in the genus Actia of the family Tachinidae.
