= Actia pulex =

Scientific classification
- Kingdom: Animalia
- Phylum: Arthropoda
- Class: Insecta
- Order: Diptera
- Family: Tachinidae
- Genus: Actia
- Species: A. pulex

Binomial name
- Actia pulex Baranov, 1938

Species of fly

Actia pulex is a species of parasitic fly in the family Tachinidae.
