= Actia gratiosa =

Scientific classification
- Kingdom: Animalia
- Phylum: Arthropoda
- Clade: Pancrustacea
- Class: Insecta
- Order: Diptera
- Family: Tachinidae
- Genus: Actia
- Species: A. gratiosa

Binomial name
- Actia gratiosa (Mesnil, 1954)

Synonyms
- Entomophaga gratiosa Mesnil, 1954

Species of fly

Actia gratiosa is a species of tachinid fly known from the Democratic Republic of the Congo. It was described in 1954 by Louis-Paul Mesnil based on a based on a male holotype specimen collected in Goma.
