= Actia deferens =

Scientific classification
- Kingdom: Animalia
- Phylum: Arthropoda
- Class: Insecta
- Order: Diptera
- Family: Tachinidae
- Genus: Actia
- Species: A. deferens

Binomial name
- Actia deferens Malloch, 1930

Species of fly

Actia deferens is a species of parasitic fly in the family Tachinidae.
