= Actia nigrapex =

Scientific classification
- Kingdom: Animalia
- Phylum: Arthropoda
- Class: Insecta
- Order: Diptera
- Family: Tachinidae
- Subfamily: Tachininae
- Tribe: Siphonini
- Genus: Actia
- Species: A. nigrapex

Binomial name
- Actia nigrapex Mesnil, 1977

Species of fly

Actia nigrapex is a species of parasitic fly in the family Tachinidae.
