= Actia completa =

Scientific classification
- Kingdom: Animalia
- Phylum: Arthropoda
- Class: Insecta
- Order: Diptera
- Family: Tachinidae
- Genus: Actia
- Species: A. completa

Binomial name
- Actia completa Malloch, 1930

Species of fly

Actia completa is a species of parasitic fly in the family Tachinidae.
