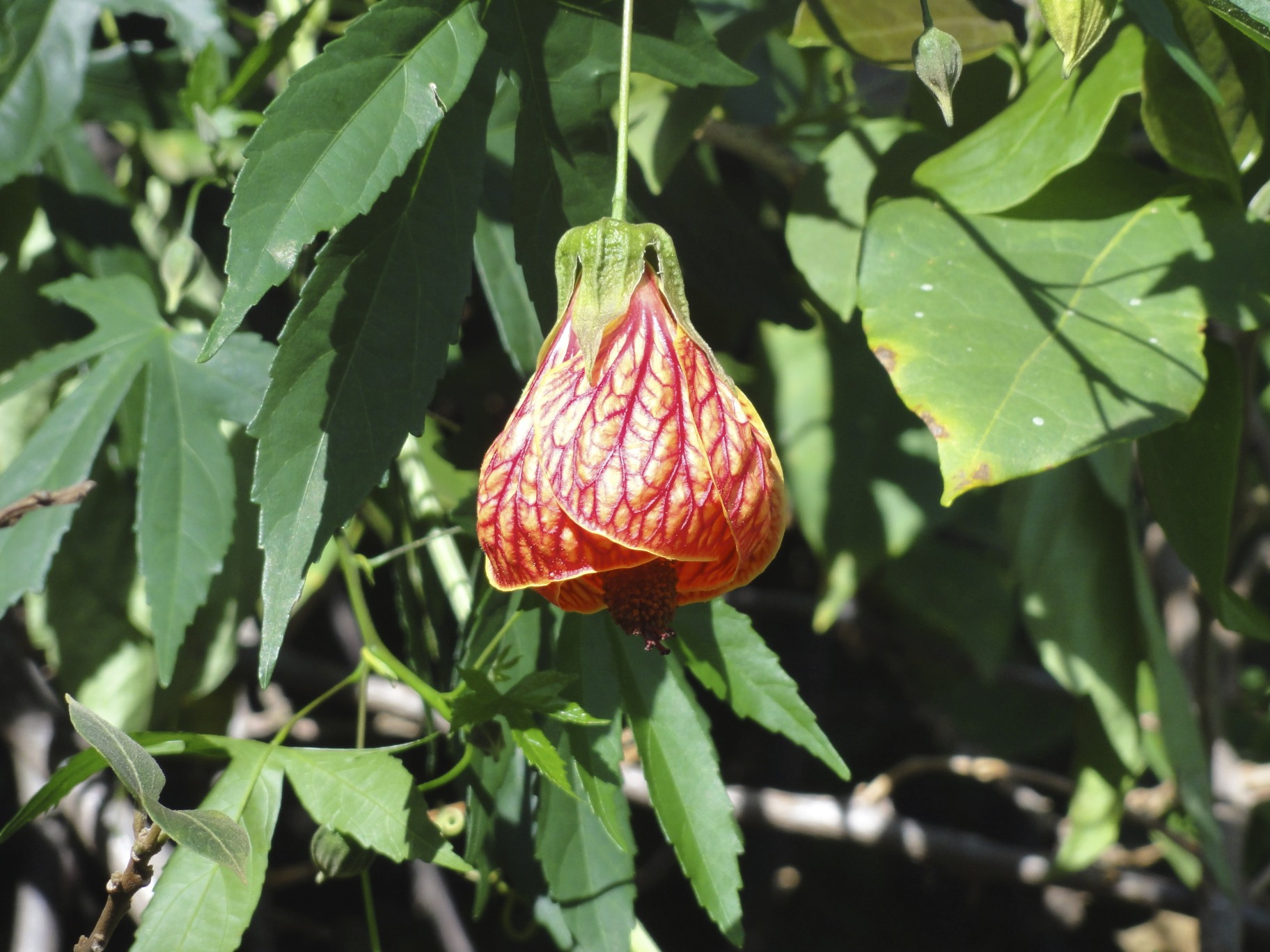

Scientific classification
- Kingdom: Plantae
- Clade: Embryophytes
- Clade: Tracheophytes
- Clade: Spermatophytes
- Clade: Angiosperms
- Clade: Eudicots
- Clade: Rosids
- Order: Malvales
- Family: Malvaceae
- Genus: Abutilon
- Species: A. pictum

Binomial name
- Abutilon pictum (Gillies) Walp.

Synonyms
- Callianthe picta; Sida picta

= Callianthe picta =

Species of flowering plant

Callianthe picta, formerly Abutilon pictum, is a species of flowering plant in the family Malvaceae. It is native to southern Brazil, Argentina, Paraguay and Uruguay. The plant has become naturalised in Central America, and is used in horticulture. Common names include redvein abutilon, red vein Indian mallow, redvein flowering maple, Chinese-lantern and red vein Chinese lanterns. Callianthe striata (formerly A. striatum) is sometimes considered a synonym of C. picta.

== Description ==
Abutilon pictum is a shrub growing to 5 metres (16 ft) tall by 2 metres (6.6 ft) wide. The leaves are 5–15 cm long, three- to five- (rarely seven-) lobed.

The yellow to orange-red bell shaped flowers have prominent dark red veining, with five petals 2–4 cm long. It blooms from April to September, and longer in warmer subtropical areas. The flowers attract pollinators, such as native bees and hummingbirds.

The Latin specific epithet pictum means "painted".

== Uses ==
=== Culinary ===
The flowers are edible, raw or cooked, with the sweet flavor increasing the longer the bloom is open.

=== Cultivation ===
Abutilon pictum is cultivated as a popular ornamental plant, for use in gardens in subtropical and warm temperate climates. It is also planted in containers or pots, on patios and balconies outdoors, or as a winter house plant.

The plant can grow in light shade or full sun, and is frost tender, not tolerating temperatures below 0 °C (32 °F). It requires moist soil, preferring fertile sandy, loamy, or well-drained clay soils.

==== Cultivars ====
Note: both Abutilon pictum and Abutilon striatum are susceptible to Abutilon mosaic virus - while A. pictum simply gets crinkly leaves, A. striatum develops a mottled or variegated leaf that is prized, and often sold as a different variety, notably "Gold dust" in Hawaii.

- 'Mardi Gras' — Mardi Gras abutilon (syn: Abutilon pictum 'Aureomaculatum'); very vigorous form to 10 ft. by 10 ft. but can be kept smaller/espaliered, has large green leaves splashed boldly with gold, narrow light orange flowers.
- 'Thompsonii' — variegated Thompson's abutilon (syn: Abutilon striatum 'Thompsonii'); speckled yellow and green variegated leaves, orange flowers: this cultivar has gained the Royal Horticultural Society's Award of Garden Merit.
