= Actia rubiginosa =

Scientific classification
- Kingdom: Animalia
- Phylum: Arthropoda
- Class: Insecta
- Order: Diptera
- Family: Tachinidae
- Genus: Actia
- Species: A. rubiginosa

Binomial name
- Actia rubiginosa (Mesnil, 1954)

Species of fly

Actia rubiginosa is a species of parasitic fly in the family Tachinidae.
