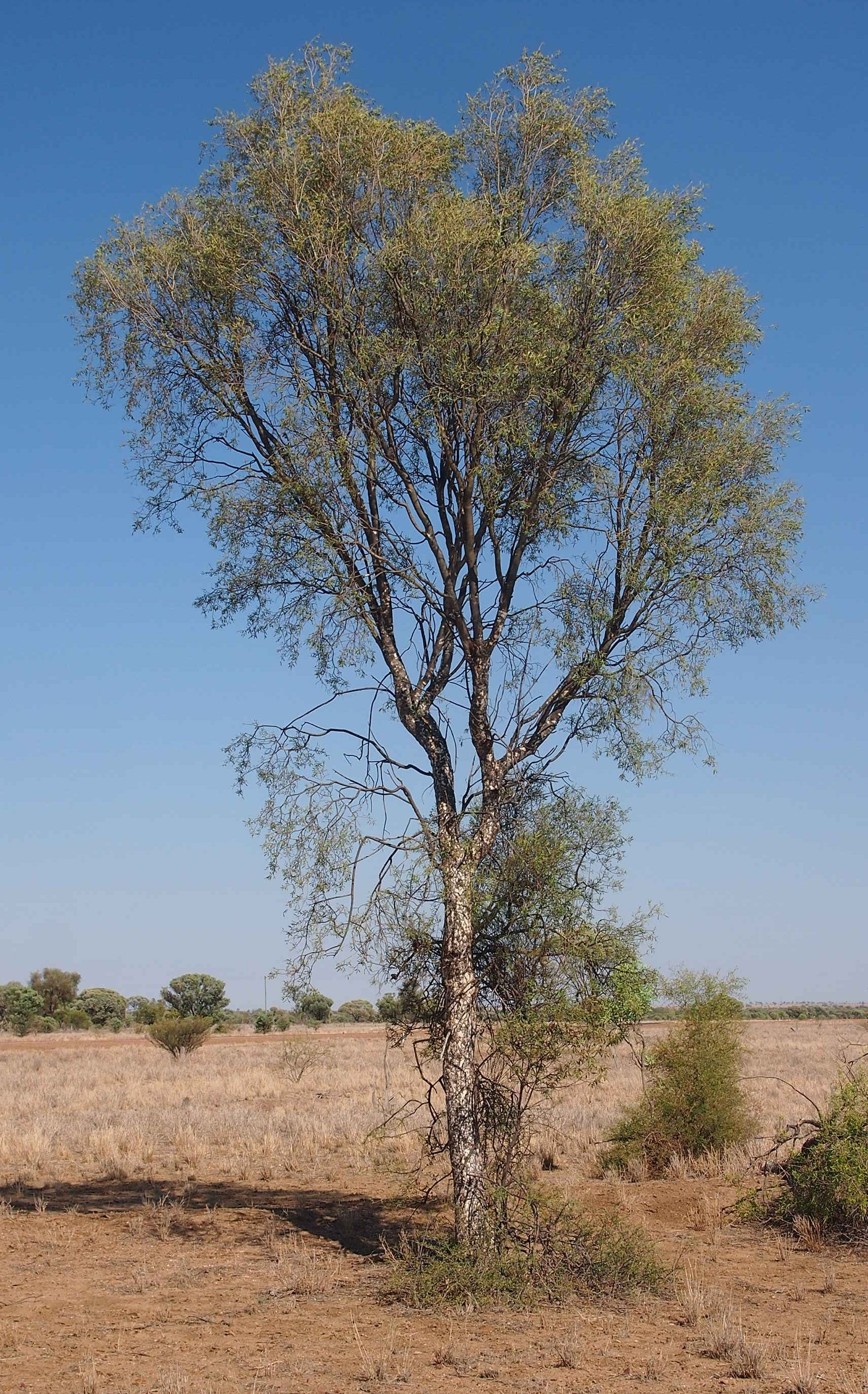
- Flindersia maculosa

Scientific classification
- Kingdom: Plantae
- Clade: Tracheophytes
- Clade: Angiosperms
- Clade: Eudicots
- Clade: Rosids
- Order: Sapindales
- Family: Rutaceae
- Genus: Flindersia
- Species: F. maculosa

Binomial name
- Flindersia maculosa (Lindl.) Benth.

Synonyms
- Elaeodendron maculosum Lindl.; Flindersia maculata F.Muell. nom. illeg.

= Flindersia maculosa =

Leopardwood

Species of tree

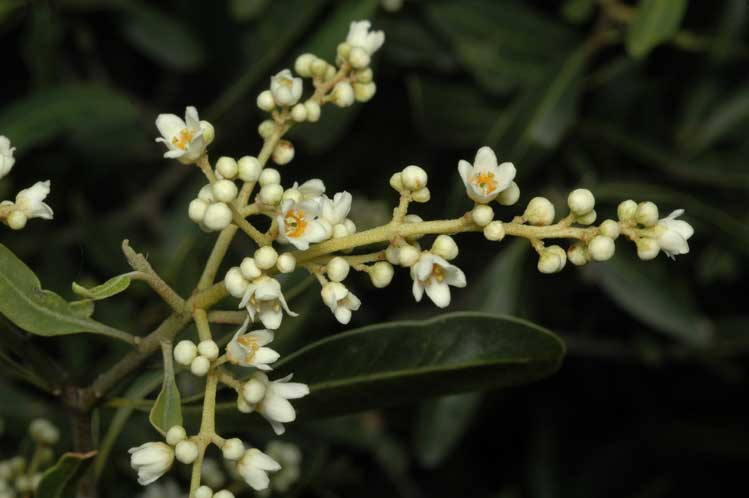
Flowers

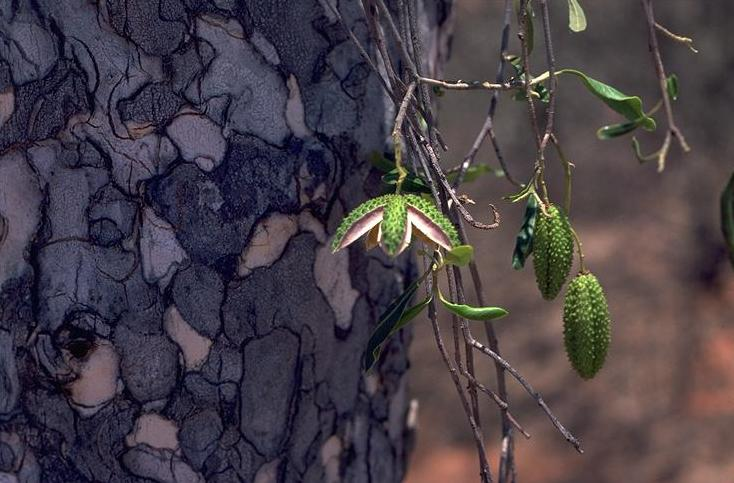
Fruit

Flindersia maculosa, commonly known as leopardwood or leopard tree, is a species of tree in the family Rutaceae and is endemic to inland areas of eastern Australia. It has mottled bark, simple leaves arranged in opposite pairs, white to cream-coloured flowers and fruit studded with rough points.

== Description ==
Flindersia maculosa is a tree that typically grows to a height of 15 m (49 ft), developing from a tangled mass of spiny branches in the juvenile stage. The trunk is mottled due to the bark shedding in patches. The leaves are simple, arranged in opposite pairs, narrow oblong to lance-shaped or linear, 10–80 mm (0.39–3.15 in) long and 2.5–10 mm (0.098–0.394 in) wide on a petiole 2–15 mm (0.079–0.591 in) long. The upper surface of the leaf is shiny and dark green, the lower side dull and paler. The flowers are arranged in panicles 10–80 mm (0.39–3.15 in) long on the ends of branchlets. The sepals are 1–1.5 mm (0.039–0.059 in) long, the petals white to cream-coloured and 3–4 mm (0.12–0.16 in) long. Flowering occurs from September to December and the fruit is a woody capsule studded with rough points and that opens into five section, releasing winged seeds about 18 mm (0.71 in) long.

== Taxonomy ==
Leopardwood was first formally described in 1848 by John Lindley in Thomas Mitchell's Journal of an Expedition into the Interior of Tropical Australia. In 1963, George Bentham changed the name to Flindersia maculosa in Flora Australiensis.

== Distribution and habitat ==
Flindersia maculosa grows on stony hills and sand plains from Hughenden in central Queensland to the Riverina district in south-western New South Wales and from Walgett to Ivanhoe and Broken Hill in that state.

== Uses ==
Leopardwood is a useful fodder tree in drought periods but as the tree does not recuperate well, it should only be pollarded. The wood of the tree is sometimes used to construct fence posts and pick handles.

Nectar from the buds and gum from the bark have been used to make a sweet drink. The drink from the gum has been used as a remedy for diarrhea.

== Ecology ==
Larvae of the moth Opodiphthera astrophela feed on the leopardwood tree. An unidentified beetle in the genus Anilara can cause serious damage to the leopardwood tree. The mistletoe Amyema lucasii grows almost exclusively on the F. maculosa.

== Conservation status ==
Flindersia maculosa is classified as of "least concern" under the Queensland Government Nature Conservation Act 1992.

=== Gallery ===
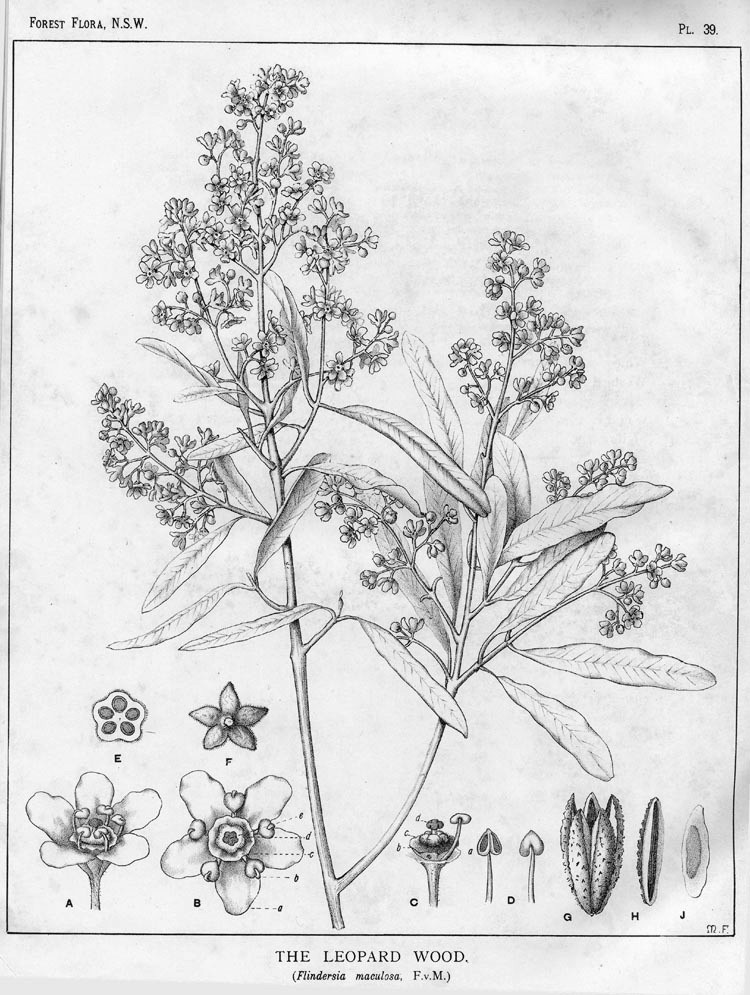
drawing by Margaret Flockton

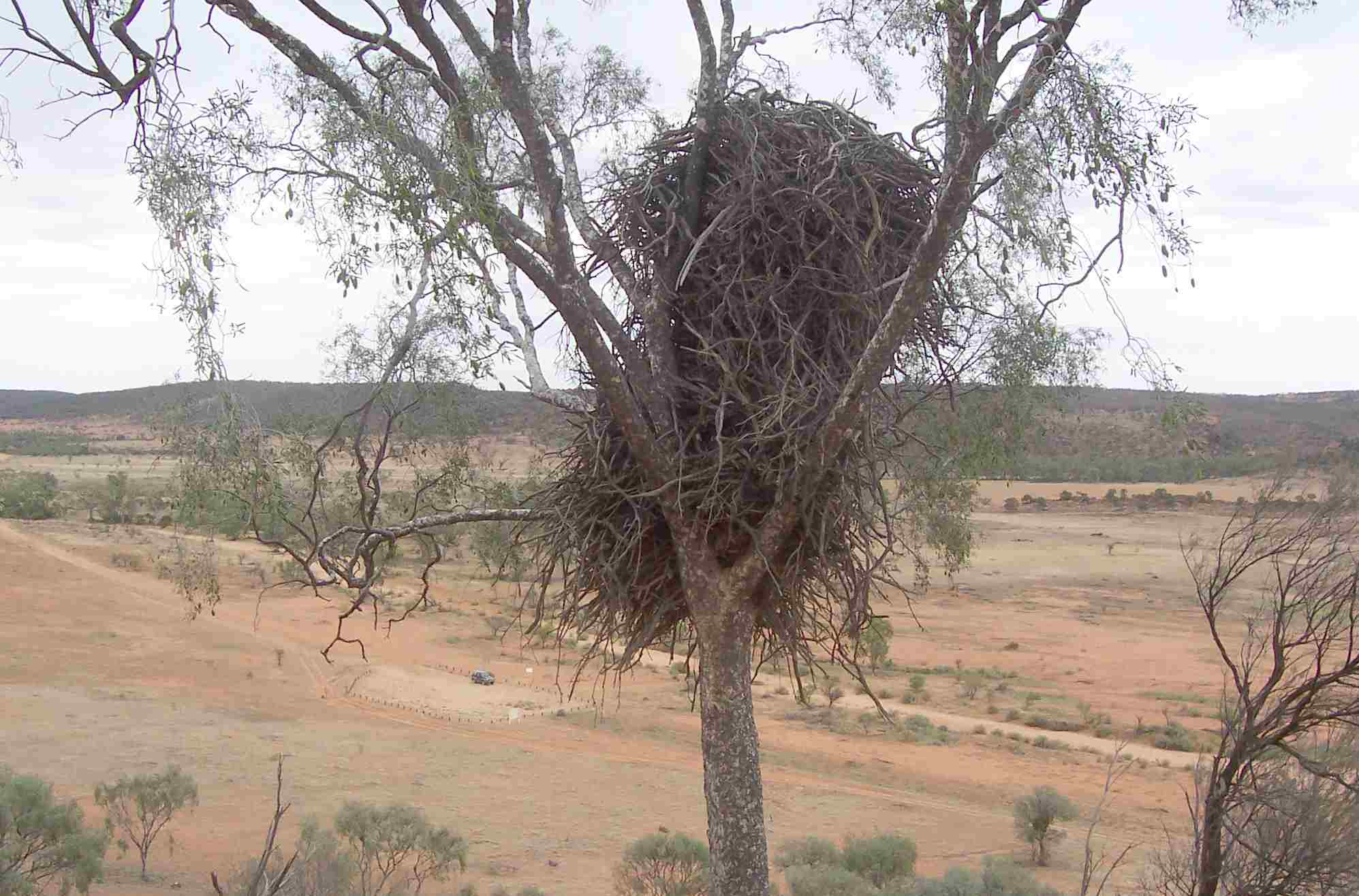
A wedge-tailed eagle's nest in a fruiting leopardwood tree at Mutawintji National Park

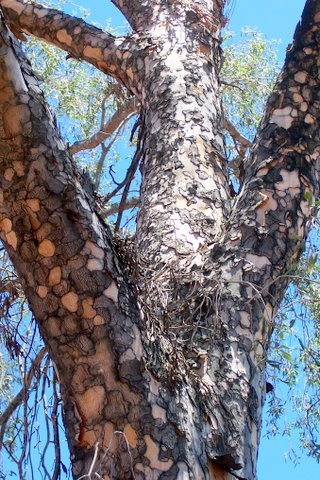
Bark
