= Actia nudibasis =

Scientific classification
- Kingdom: Animalia
- Phylum: Arthropoda
- Clade: Pancrustacea
- Class: Insecta
- Order: Diptera
- Family: Tachinidae
- Subfamily: Tachininae
- Tribe: Siphonini
- Genus: Actia
- Species: A. nudibasis

Binomial name
- Actia nudibasis Stein, 1924

Synonyms
- Tachina pilipennis Hartig, 1837; Musca pilipennis Ratzeburg, 1844

Species of fly

Actia nudibasis is a Palearctic species of flies in the family Tachinidae.

== Distribution ==
Austria, Germany, United Kingdom, Hungary, Poland, Sweden, Russia, Japan.

== Hosts ==
Retinia resinella & Rhyacionia buoliana.
