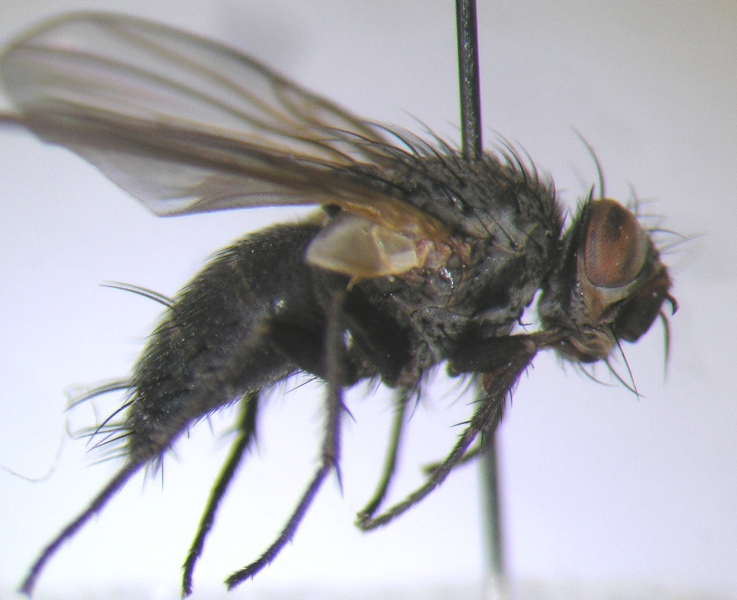

Scientific classification
- Kingdom: Animalia
- Phylum: Arthropoda
- Class: Insecta
- Order: Diptera
- Family: Tachinidae
- Genus: Actia
- Species: A. lamia

Binomial name
- Actia lamia (Meigen, 1838)

Synonyms
- Actia frontalis (Macquart, 1845); Roeselia lamia Meigen, 1838; Thryptocera frontalis Macquart, 1845

= Actia lamia =

Species of fly

Actia lamia is the type species of the genus Actia of the family Tachinidae.

== Range ==
It is a common European species, ranging extents from Italy in the south, to parts of Norway in the north, and from Great Britain (excluding Ireland) in the west to the Caucasus and parts of Siberia in the east.

== Biology ==
video of Actia lamia taken in Germany

Like most tachinids it is a parasitoid of Lepidoptera. Its biology has not been well studied, but it has been reared from species of Epiblema (microlepidoptera).
