= Actia rufescens =

Scientific classification
- Kingdom: Animalia
- Phylum: Arthropoda
- Class: Insecta
- Order: Diptera
- Family: Tachinidae
- Genus: Actia
- Species: A. rufescens

Binomial name
- Actia rufescens Greene, 1934

Synonyms
- Actiopsis rufescens Greene, 1934

Species of fly

Actia rufescens is a species of tachinid flies in the genus Actia belonging to the family Tachinidae.

== Distribution ==
Québec, North Dakota, South Dakota, Iowa, Illinois, Michigan, Ohio.
