= Actia radialis =

Scientific classification
- Kingdom: Animalia
- Phylum: Arthropoda
- Class: Insecta
- Order: Diptera
- Family: Tachinidae
- Genus: Actia
- Species: A. radialis

Binomial name
- Actia radialis O'Hara, 1991

Species of fly

Actia radialis is a species of tachinid flies in the genus Actia of the family Tachinidae.

== Distribution ==
Québec, Ontario.
