= Actia sternalis =

Scientific classification
- Kingdom: Animalia
- Phylum: Arthropoda
- Class: Insecta
- Order: Diptera
- Family: Tachinidae
- Genus: Actia
- Species: A. sternalis

Binomial name
- Actia sternalis O'Hara, 1991

Species of fly

Actia sternalis is a species of tachinid flies in the genus Actia of the family Tachinidae.

== Distribution ==
Yukon.
