= Actia interrupta =

Scientific classification
- Kingdom: Animalia
- Phylum: Arthropoda
- Class: Insecta
- Order: Diptera
- Family: Tachinidae
- Genus: Actia
- Species: A. interrupta

Binomial name
- Actia interrupta Curran, 1933

Synonyms
- Actia labellata Kamran, 1980; Actia pauciseta Kamran, 1980

Species of fly

Actia interrupta is a species of tachinid flies in the genus Actia of the family Tachinidae. Actia interrupta is an important parasitoid of the genus Choristoneura, which includes pests such as the spruce budworm.

== Distribution ==
Alaska, British Columbia to Newfoundland, California to Virginia and Tennessee, not recorded from most of central United States with the exception of Colorado.
