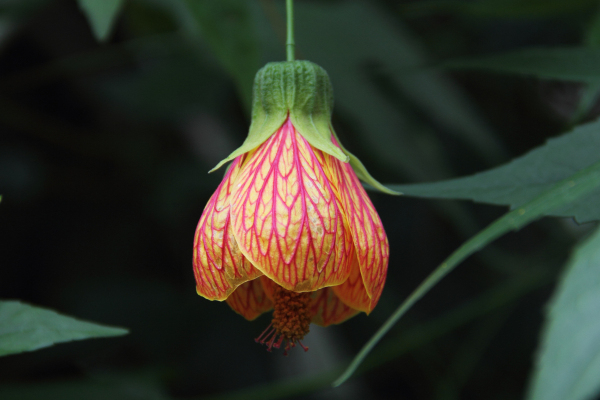
- Callianthe striata flower

Scientific classification
- Kingdom: Plantae
- Clade: Embryophytes
- Clade: Tracheophytes
- Clade: Spermatophytes
- Clade: Angiosperms
- Clade: Eudicots
- Clade: Rosids
- Order: Malvales
- Family: Malvaceae
- Genus: Callianthe
- Species: C. striata

Binomial name
- Callianthe striata (G.F.Dicks. ex Lindl.) Donnell
- It is endemic to southern and southeastern Brazil

= Callianthe striata =

Species of flowering plant

Callianthe striata is a species of flowering plant in the family Malvaceae endemic to southern and southeastern Brazil.

== Description ==
Callianthe striata is a terrestrial shrub with 3–5 lobed leaves. The solitary flowers are pendulous. They possess an exserted staminal tube.

== Taxonomy ==
Callianthe striata, formerly Abutilon striatum, is sometimes considered a synonym of Callianthe picta, formerly Abutilon pictum.

== Distribution and habitat ==
It is endemic to the region spanning from São Paulo to Rio Grande do Sul, Brazil.

== Cultivation ==
It may be cultivated in partial shade to full sun to.
