= Actia solida =

Scientific classification
- Kingdom: Animalia
- Phylum: Arthropoda
- Class: Insecta
- Order: Diptera
- Family: Tachinidae
- Genus: Actia
- Species: A. solida

Binomial name
- Actia solida Tachi & Shima, 1998

Species of fly

Actia solida is a species of tachinid flies in the genus Actia of the family Tachinidae.
