= Actia infantula =

Scientific classification
- Kingdom: Animalia
- Phylum: Arthropoda
- Clade: Pancrustacea
- Class: Insecta
- Order: Diptera
- Family: Tachinidae
- Genus: Actia
- Species: A. infantula

Binomial name
- Actia infantula (Zetterstedt, 1844)

Synonyms
- Tachina infantula Zetterstedt, 1844; Thryptocera antennalis Rondani, 1859; Thryptocera aristalis Rondani, 1859; Thryptocera villeneuvii Strobl, 1859

Species of fly

Actia infantula is a Palearctic species of fly in the family Tachinidae.

== Distribution ==
Spain, Switzerland, France, Italy, Sweden, Hungary, Israel, Russia.

== Hosts ==
The Skin Moth Monopis laevigella.
