= Actia painei =

Scientific classification
- Kingdom: Animalia
- Phylum: Arthropoda
- Class: Insecta
- Order: Diptera
- Family: Tachinidae
- Genus: Actia
- Species: A. painei

Binomial name
- Actia painei Crosskey, 1962

Species of fly

Actia painei is a species of parasitic fly in the family Tachinidae.
