= Actia jocularis =

Scientific classification
- Kingdom: Animalia
- Phylum: Arthropoda
- Clade: Pancrustacea
- Class: Insecta
- Order: Diptera
- Family: Tachinidae
- Genus: Actia
- Species: A. jocularis

Binomial name
- Actia jocularis Mesnil, 1957

Species of fly

Actia jocularis is an eastern Palearctic species of fly in the family Tachinidae.

== Distribution ==
Japan.
