= Actia mongolica =

Scientific classification
- Kingdom: Animalia
- Phylum: Arthropoda
- Clade: Pancrustacea
- Class: Insecta
- Order: Diptera
- Family: Tachinidae
- Genus: Actia
- Species: A. mongolica

Binomial name
- Actia mongolica Richter, 1976

Species of fly

Actia mongolica is an eastern Palearctic species of fly in the family Tachinidae.

== Distribution ==
Mongolia and Eastern Siberia.
