= Actia yasumatsui =

Scientific classification
- Kingdom: Animalia
- Phylum: Arthropoda
- Class: Insecta
- Order: Diptera
- Family: Tachinidae
- Genus: Actia
- Species: A. yasumatsui

Binomial name
- Actia yasumatsui Shima, 1970

Species of fly

Actia yasumatsui is a species of tachinid flies in the genus Actia of the family Tachinidae.
