= Callianthe elegans =

Scientific classification
- Kingdom: Plantae
- Clade: Embryophytes
- Clade: Tracheophytes
- Clade: Spermatophytes
- Clade: Angiosperms
- Clade: Eudicots
- Clade: Rosids
- Order: Malvales
- Family: Malvaceae
- Genus: Callianthe
- Species: C. elegans

Binomial name
- Callianthe elegans (A.St.-Hil.) Donnell

Synonyms
- Abutilon elegans A.St.-Hil.

Species of flowering plant

Callianthe elegans is a species of flowering plant in the tribe Malveae. It is native to southeastern Brazil.
