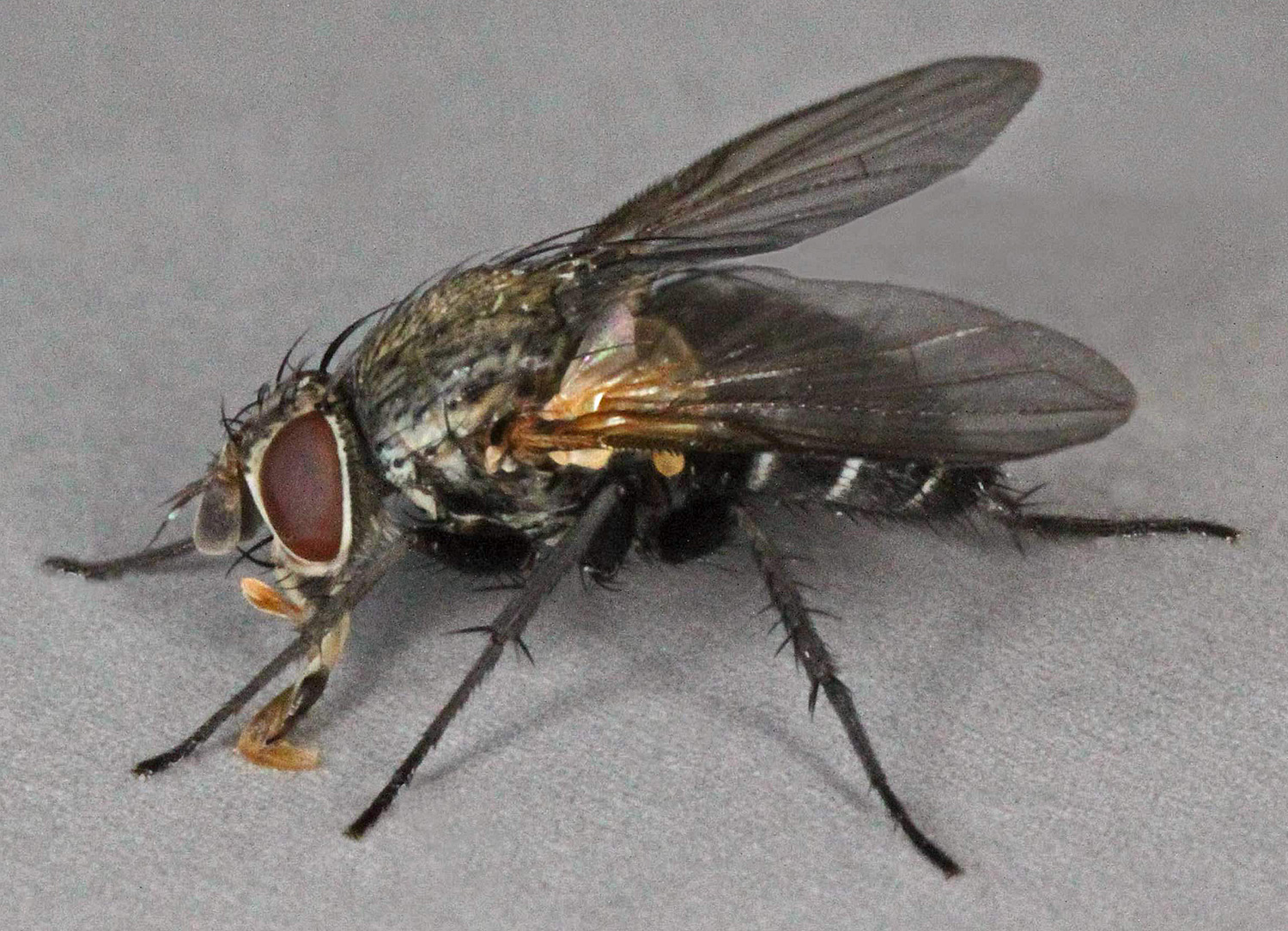

Scientific classification
- Kingdom: Animalia
- Phylum: Arthropoda
- Clade: Pancrustacea
- Class: Insecta
- Order: Diptera
- Family: Tachinidae
- Genus: Actia
- Species: A. pilipennis

Binomial name
- Actia pilipennis (Fallén, 1810)

Synonyms
- List: Actia broteas (Walker, 1849); Actia excensa (Walker, 1853); Actia reducta Villeneuve, 1920; Morinia bigoti Milliere, 1864; Tachina broteas Walker, 1849; Tachina excensa Walker, 1853; Tachina pilipennis Fallén, 1810; Thryptocera flavisquamis Robineau-Desvoidy, 1851; Thryptocera humeralis Robineau-Desvoidy, 1851; Thryptocera nigrifrons Robineau-Desvoidy, 1863

= Actia pilipennis =

Species of fly

Actia pilipennis is a Palearctic species of fly in the family Tachinidae.

== Distribution ==
France, Ireland, United Kingdom, Hungary, Sweden, Russia, Mongolia, Japan.

== Hosts ==
Choreutidae, Oecophoridae, Pterolonchidae, Tortricidae & Gelechiidae.
