= Actia diffidens =

Scientific classification
- Kingdom: Animalia
- Phylum: Arthropoda
- Class: Insecta
- Order: Diptera
- Family: Tachinidae
- Genus: Actia
- Species: A. diffidens

Binomial name
- Actia diffidens Curran, 1933

Species of fly

Actia diffidens is a species of tachinid flies in the genus Actia of the family Tachinidae. It is known to parasitize Canadian tortricid moth larvae.

== Distribution ==
Ontario to New Brunswick, to Missouri and North Carolina and New Mexico.
