= Actia chrysocera =

Scientific classification
- Kingdom: Animalia
- Phylum: Arthropoda
- Clade: Pancrustacea
- Class: Insecta
- Order: Diptera
- Family: Tachinidae
- Genus: Actia
- Species: A. chrysocera

Binomial name
- Actia chrysocera Bezzi, 1923

Species of fly

Actia chrysocera is a species of tachinid fly known from the Seychelles. It was described in 1923 by Italian entomologist Mario Bezzi based on a male holotype specimen collected from Long Island, Seychelles.
