= Actia cuthbertsoni =

Scientific classification
- Kingdom: Animalia
- Phylum: Arthropoda
- Clade: Pancrustacea
- Class: Insecta
- Order: Diptera
- Family: Tachinidae
- Genus: Actia
- Species: A. cuthbertsoni

Binomial name
- Actia cuthbertsoni Curran, 1933

Species of fly

Actia antiqua is a species of tachinid fly known from Madagascar, Uganda, and Zimbabwe. It was described in 1933 by Charles Howard Curran based on a male holotype specimen collected in 1928 from Kadoma, Zimbabwe.
