= Actia exsecta =

Scientific classification
- Kingdom: Animalia
- Phylum: Arthropoda
- Clade: Pancrustacea
- Class: Insecta
- Order: Diptera
- Family: Tachinidae
- Genus: Actia
- Species: A. exsecta

Binomial name
- Actia exsecta Villeneuve, 1936

Species of fly

Actia exsecta is a species of tachinid fly known from Uganda. It was described in 1936 by Joseph Villeneuve de Janti based on two male syntype specimens collected in Kampala.
