= Actia dimorpha =

Scientific classification
- Kingdom: Animalia
- Phylum: Arthropoda
- Class: Insecta
- Order: Diptera
- Family: Tachinidae
- Genus: Actia
- Species: A. dimorpha

Binomial name
- Actia dimorpha O'Hara, 1991

Species of fly

Actia dimorpha is a species of tachinid flies in the genus Actia of the family Tachinidae. The species was first described in 1991 in Sapelo Island, Georgia, United States.
