= Actia rejecta =

Scientific classification
- Kingdom: Animalia
- Phylum: Arthropoda
- Clade: Pancrustacea
- Class: Insecta
- Order: Diptera
- Family: Tachinidae
- Genus: Actia
- Species: A. rejecta

Binomial name
- Actia rejecta Bezzi & Lamb, 1926

Species of fly

Actia rejecta is a species of parasitic fly in the family Tachinidae.
