= Actia quadriseta =

Scientific classification
- Kingdom: Animalia
- Phylum: Arthropoda
- Class: Insecta
- Order: Diptera
- Family: Tachinidae
- Genus: Actia
- Species: A. quadriseta

Binomial name
- Actia quadriseta Malloch, 1936

Species of fly

Actia quadriseta is a species of parasitic fly in the family Tachinidae.
