= Actia triseta =

Scientific classification
- Kingdom: Animalia
- Phylum: Arthropoda
- Clade: Pancrustacea
- Class: Insecta
- Order: Diptera
- Family: Tachinidae
- Genus: Actia
- Species: A. triseta

Binomial name
- Actia triseta (Mesnil, 1954)

Synonyms
- Entomophaga triseta Mesnil, 1954

Species of fly

Actia triseta is a species of tachinid fly known from the Democratic Republic of the Congo and Rwanda. It was described in 1954 by Louis-Paul Mesnil based on a male holotype specimen collected from Mount Mikeno in the Democratic Republic of the Congo at 2,400 m (7,900 ft) above sea level.
