= Actia crassicornis =

Scientific classification
- Kingdom: Animalia
- Phylum: Arthropoda
- Clade: Pancrustacea
- Class: Insecta
- Order: Diptera
- Family: Tachinidae
- Genus: Actia
- Species: A. maksymovi

Binomial name
- Actia maksymovi Mesnil, 1952

Species of fly

Actia maksymovi is a Palearctic species of fly in the family Tachinidae.

== Distribution ==
United Kingdom (Where it is rare), Switzerland, France, Czech Republic, Japan, Mongolia, Russia.

== Hosts ==
Tortricidae.
