= Actia ciligera =

Scientific classification
- Kingdom: Animalia
- Phylum: Arthropoda
- Clade: Pancrustacea
- Class: Insecta
- Order: Diptera
- Family: Tachinidae
- Genus: Actia
- Species: A. ciligera

Binomial name
- Actia ciligera (Mesnil, 1954)

Synonyms
- Entomophaga ciligera Mesnil, 1954

Species of fly

Actia ciligera is a species of tachinid fly known from the Democratic Republic of the Congo. It was described in 1954 by Louis-Paul Mesnil based on a female holotype specimen collected east of Sake on the northern shore of Lake Kivu at 1,500 m (4,900 ft) above sea level.
