= Actia autumnalis =

Scientific classification
- Kingdom: Animalia
- Phylum: Arthropoda
- Clade: Pancrustacea
- Class: Insecta
- Order: Diptera
- Family: Tachinidae
- Genus: Actia
- Species: A. autumnalis

Binomial name
- Actia autumnalis (Townsend, 1917)

Synonyms
- Actiopsis autumnalis Townsend, 1917

Species of fly

Actia autumnalis is a species of tachinid flies in the genus Actia of the family Tachinidae.

== Distribution ==
Ontario to New Brunswick, to Missouri and North Carolina.
