= Actia ampla =

Scientific classification
- Kingdom: Animalia
- Phylum: Arthropoda
- Class: Insecta
- Order: Diptera
- Family: Tachinidae
- Genus: Actia
- Species: A. ampla

Binomial name
- Actia ampla Tachi & Shima, 1998

Species of fly

Actia ampla is a species of parasitic fly in the family Tachinidae. It is found in temperate Asia.
