= Actia pamirica =

Scientific classification
- Kingdom: Animalia
- Phylum: Arthropoda
- Clade: Pancrustacea
- Class: Insecta
- Order: Diptera
- Family: Tachinidae
- Genus: Actia
- Species: A. pamirica

Binomial name
- Actia pamirica Richter, 1974

Species of fly

Actia pamirica is an eastern Palearctic species of fly in the family Tachinidae.

== Distribution ==
Tajikistan.
