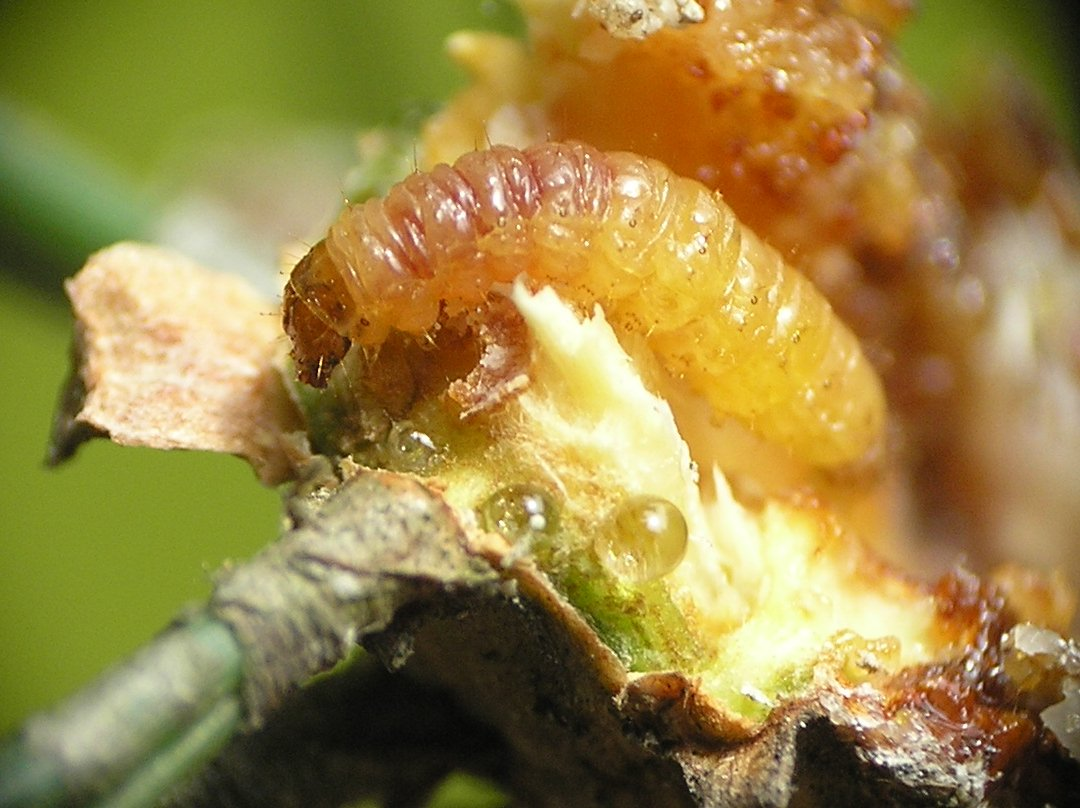

Scientific classification
- Kingdom: Animalia
- Phylum: Arthropoda
- Class: Insecta
- Order: Lepidoptera
- Family: Tortricidae
- Genus: Retinia
- Species: R. resinella

Binomial name
- Retinia resinella (Linnaeus, 1758)

Synonyms
- Petrova resinella; Petrova rexinella; Phalaena resinella Linnaeus, 1758; Carpocapsa obesana Laharpe, 1858; Scoparia resinalis Guenee, 1854; Pyralis resinana Fabricius, 1794; Scoparia resinea Haworth, [1811]

= Retinia resinella =

Species of moth

Retinia resinella, the pine resin-gall moth, is a moth of the family Tortricidae.

== Description ==
The wingspan of Retinia resinella can reach 16–22 mm. Adults are on wing from May to June.

The larva lives in the shoots of Pinus sylvestris where it causes a resin gall to develop. Development takes two years.

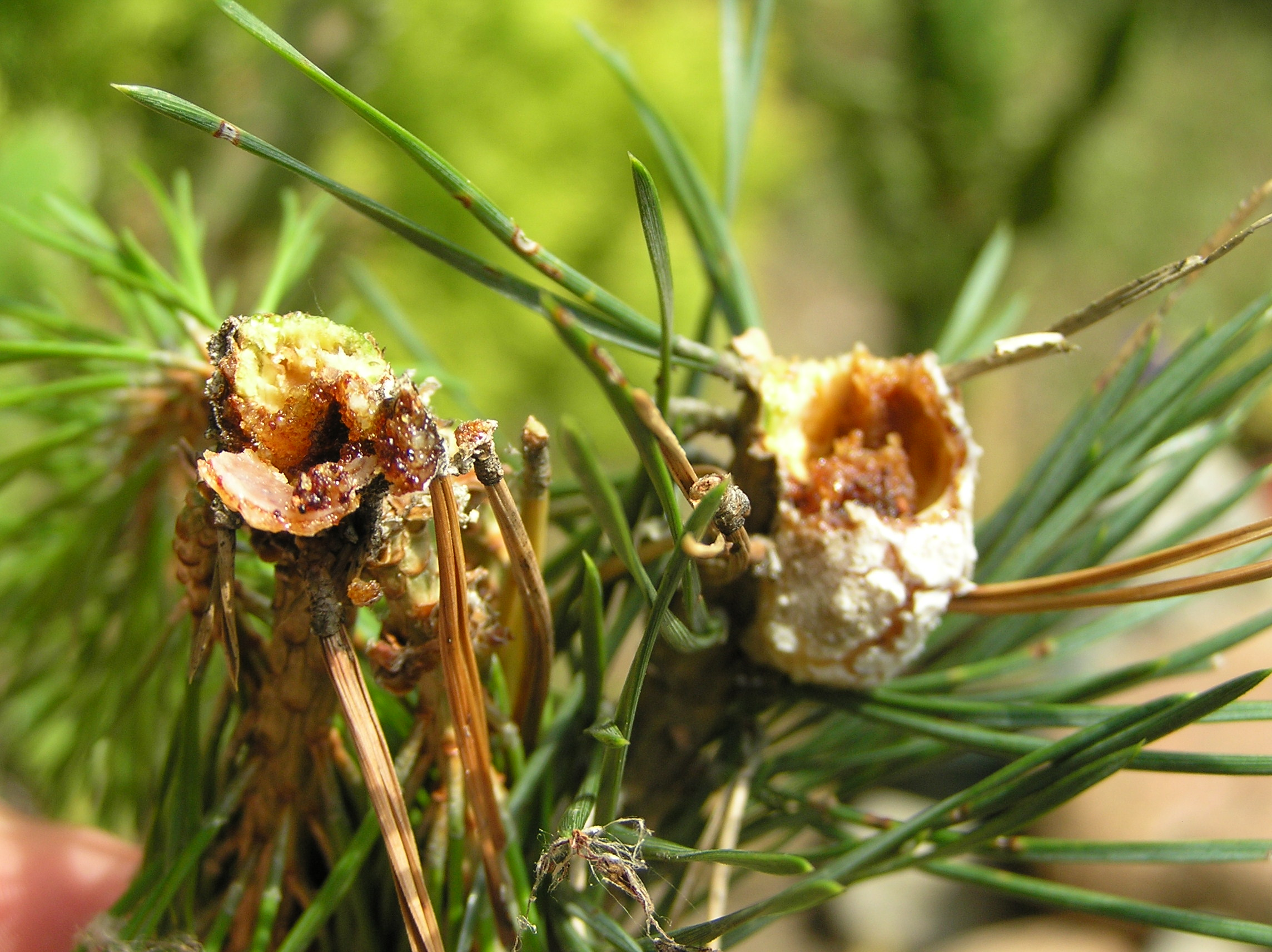
Resin gall

== Parasites ==
The larvae are attached by the tachinid fly Actia nudibasis.

== Distribution ==
This species can be found from Europe to eastern Russia, China (Heilongjiang, Inner Mongolia) and Japan.
