= Actia nitidiventris =

Scientific classification
- Kingdom: Animalia
- Phylum: Arthropoda
- Class: Insecta
- Order: Diptera
- Family: Tachinidae
- Genus: Actia
- Species: A. nitidiventris

Binomial name
- Actia nitidiventris Curran, 1933

Species of fly

Actia nitidiventris is a species of parasitic fly in the family Tachinidae. It is found in Central America.
