= Actia dubitata =

Scientific classification
- Kingdom: Animalia
- Phylum: Arthropoda
- Clade: Pancrustacea
- Class: Insecta
- Order: Diptera
- Family: Tachinidae
- Genus: Actia
- Species: A. dubitata

Binomial name
- Actia dubitata Herting, 1971

Species of fly

Actia dubitata is a Palearctic species of fly in the family Tachinidae.

== Distribution ==
Austria, Switzerland, France, Germany, Hungary, Kazakhstan, Russia.
