= Actia resinellae =

Scientific classification
- Kingdom: Animalia
- Phylum: Arthropoda
- Class: Insecta
- Order: Diptera
- Family: Tachinidae
- Genus: Actia
- Species: A. resinellae

Binomial name
- Actia resinellae (Schrank, 1781)

Synonyms
- Actia nudibasis Stein, 1924 Musca resinellae Schrank, 1781

Species of fly

Actia resinellae is a species of tachinid flies in the genus Actia of the family Tachinidae.
