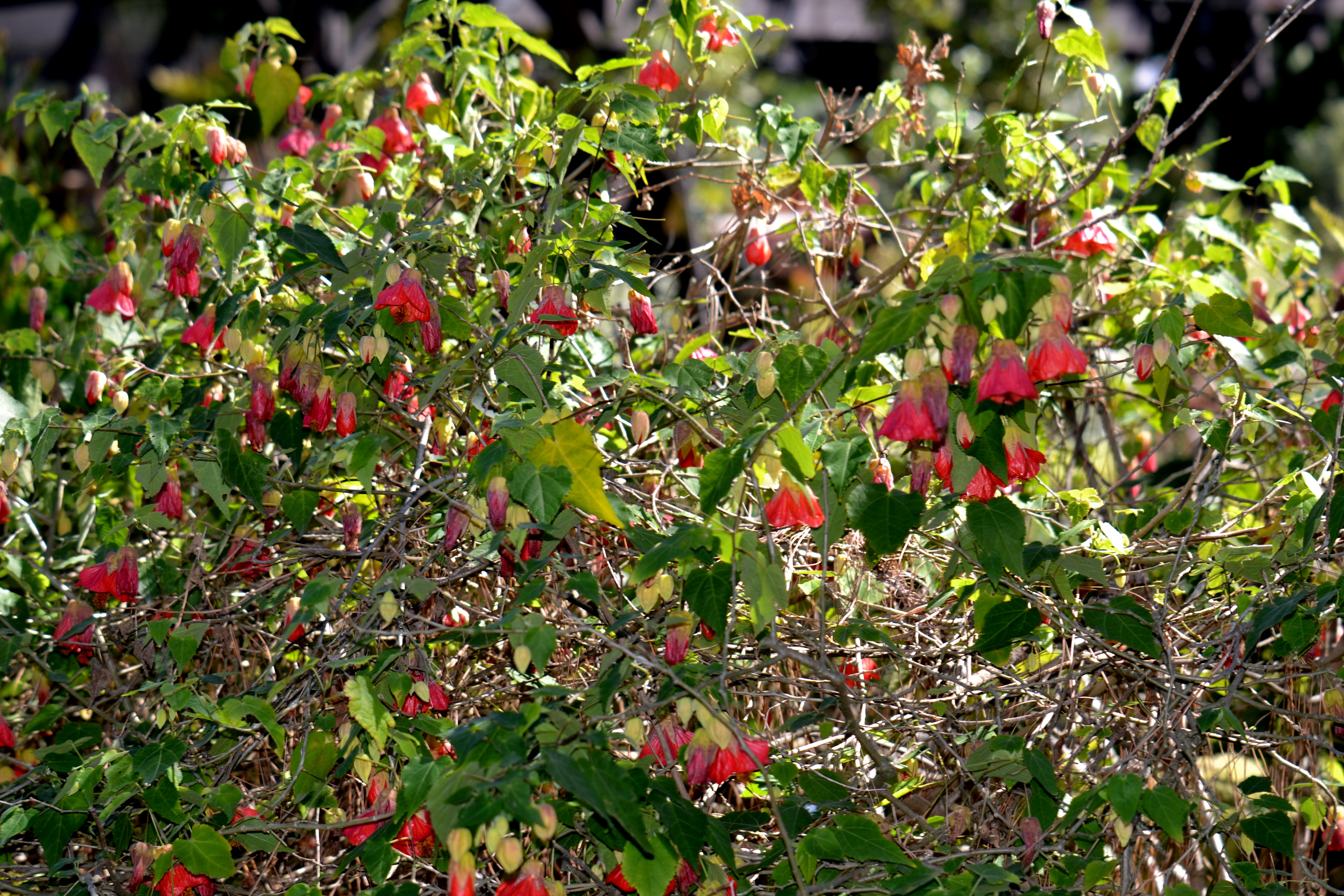
- Callianthe 'Bouncing Bells', from Orange County, USA

Scientific classification
- Kingdom: Plantae
- Clade: Embryophytes
- Clade: Tracheophytes
- Clade: Spermatophytes
- Clade: Angiosperms
- Clade: Eudicots
- Clade: Rosids
- Order: Malvales
- Family: Malvaceae
- Subfamily: Malvoideae
- Tribe: Malveae
- Genus: Callianthe; Donnell

Type species
- Callianthe rufinerva (A.St.-Hil.) Donnell

Species
- See text

= Callianthe =

Genus of flowering plants

Callianthe is a genus of flowering plants in the tribe Malveae. It is distributed throughout the Neotropics.

== Species ==
50 species are accepted.

- Callianthe amoena (K.Schum.) Donnell
- Callianthe andrade-limae (Monteiro) Donnell
- Callianthe bedfordiana (Hook.) Donnell
- Callianthe bezerrae (Monteiro) Donnell
- Callianthe costicalyx (K.Schum. ex C.Takeuchi & G.L.Esteves) Grings
- Callianthe cyclonervosa (Hochr.) Donnell
- Callianthe darwinii (Hook.f.) Donnell
- Callianthe elegans (A.St.-Hil.) Donnell
- Callianthe flava Grings
- Callianthe fluviatilis (Vell.) Donnell
- Callianthe geminiflora (Kunth) Donnell
- Callianthe glaziovii (K.Schum.) Donnell
- Callianthe inaequalis (Link & Otto) Donnell
- Callianthe jaliscana (Standl.) Donnell
- Callianthe jujuiensis (Hassl.) Donnell
- Callianthe lanata (Miq.) Donnell
- Callianthe latipetala (G.L.Esteves & Krapov.) Donnell
- Callianthe longifolia (K.Schum.) Donnell
- Callianthe macrantha (A.St.-Hil.) Donnell
- Callianthe malmeana (R.E.Fr.) Donnell
- Callianthe maritima Grings
- Callianthe megapotamica (A.Spreng.) Dorr
- Callianthe mexiae (R.E.Fr.) Donnell
- Callianthe montana (A.St.-Hil.) Donnell & C.Takeuchi
- Callianthe monteiroi (Krapov.) Donnell
- Callianthe mourae (K.Schum.) Donnell
- Callianthe muelleri-friderici (Garcke & K.Schum.) Donnell
- Callianthe nivea (Griseb.) Dorr
- Callianthe pachecoana (Standl. & Steyerm.) Donnell
- Callianthe pauciflora (A.St.-Hil.) Dorr
- Callianthe peruviana (Lam.) Dorr
- Callianthe petiolaris (Kunth) Donnell
- Callianthe pickelii (Monteiro) Donnell
- Callianthe picta (Gillies ex Hook. & Arn.) Donnell
- Callianthe purpusii (Standl.) Donnell
- Callianthe regnellii (Miq.) Donnell
- Callianthe rufinerva (A.St.-Hil.) Donnell
- Callianthe rufivela (Hochr.) Donnell
- Callianthe scabrida (K.Schum.) Donnell
- Callianthe schenckii (K.Schum.) Donnell
- Callianthe sellowiana (Klotzsch) Donnell
- Callianthe senilis (K.Schum.) Donnell
- Callianthe striata (G.F.Dicks. ex Lindl.) Donnell
- Callianthe torrendii (Monteiro) Donnell
- Callianthe tridens (Standl. & Steyerm.) Donnell
- Callianthe vexillaria (É.Morren) Donnell
