= Actia dasymyia =

Scientific classification
- Kingdom: Animalia
- Phylum: Arthropoda
- Class: Insecta
- Order: Diptera
- Family: Tachinidae
- Genus: Actia
- Species: A. dasymyia

Binomial name
- Actia dasymyia O'Hara, 1991

Species of fly

Actia dasymyia is a species of tachinid flies in the genus Actia of the family Tachinidae.

The species was first described in 1991 by entomologist James E. O'Hara as a part of a taxonomic revision of Nearctic Actia species.
