= Actia picipalpis =

Scientific classification
- Kingdom: Animalia
- Phylum: Arthropoda
- Class: Insecta
- Order: Diptera
- Family: Tachinidae
- Genus: Actia
- Species: A. picipalpis

Binomial name
- Actia picipalpis (Mesnil, 1954)

Species of fly

Actia picipalpis is a species of parasitic fly in the family Tachinidae.
