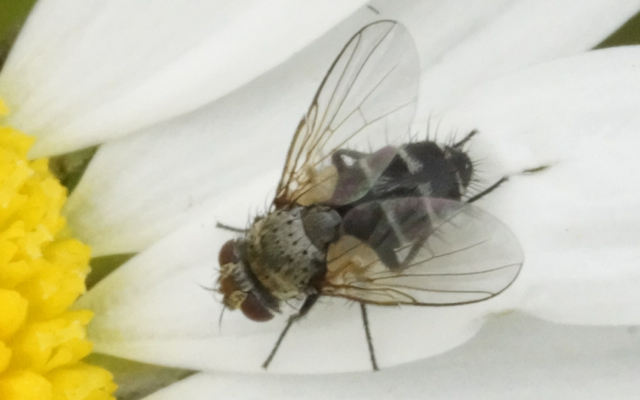

Scientific classification
- Kingdom: Animalia
- Phylum: Arthropoda
- Clade: Pancrustacea
- Class: Insecta
- Order: Diptera
- Family: Tachinidae
- Subfamily: Tachininae
- Tribe: Siphonini
- Genus: Actia; Robineau-Desvoidy, 1830

Type species
- Roselia lamia Meigen, 1838

Synonyms
- Actiopsis Townsend, 1917; Gymnopareia Brauer & Bergenstamm, 1891; Gymnophthalma Lioy, 1864; Setasiphona Townsend, 1934; Thriptocera Rondani, 1859; Thryptocera Macquart, 1834

= Actia (fly) =

Actia Temporal range: Early Jurassic 196Ma-Recent

Genus of flies

Actia is a genus of large flies in the family Tachinidae.

== Species ==
- Actia ampla Tachi & Shima, 1998
- Actia antiqua (Mesnil, 1954)
- Actia autumnalis (Townsend, 1917)
- Actia brevis Malloch, 1930
- Actia brunnea Malloch, 1930
- Actia chrysocera Bezzi, 1923
- Actia ciligera (Mesnil, 1954)
- Actia clavula Tachi & Shima, 1998
- Actia completa Malloch, 1930
- Actia crassicornis (Meigen, 1824)
- Actia cuthbertsoni Curran, 1933
- Actia darwini Malloch, 1929
- Actia dasymyia O'Hara, 1991
- Actia deferens Malloch, 1930
- Actia destituta Tachi & Shima, 1998
- Actia diffidens Curran, 1933
- Actia dimorpha O'Hara, 1991
- Actia dubitata Herting, 1971
- Actia eucosmae Bezzi, 1926
- Actia exsecta Villeneuve, 1936
- Actia fallax (Mesnil, 1954)
- Actia fulvicauda Malloch, 1930
- Actia gratiosa (Mesnil, 1954)
- Actia hargreavesi Curran, 1933
- Actia infantula (Zetterstedt, 1844)
- Actia interrupta Curran, 1933
- Actia jocularis Mesnil, 1957
- Actia lamia (Meigen, 1838)
- Actia lata Malloch, 1930
- Actia linguata Mesnil, 1968
- Actia longilingua (Mesnil, 1954)
- Actia magnicornis Malloch, 1930
- Actia maksymovi Mesnil, 1952
- Actia mimetica Malloch, 1930
- Actia mongolica Richter, 1976
- Actia munroi Curran, 1927
- Actia nigra Shima, 1970
- Actia nigrapex Mesnil, 1977
- Actia nigriventris Malloch, 1935
- Actia nigroscutellata Lundbeck, 1927
- Actia nitidella Villeneuve, 1936
- Actia nitidiventris Curran, 1933
- Actia nudibasis Stein, 1924
- Actia oblimata Mesnil, 1957
- Actia painei Crosskey, 1962
- Actia pallens Curran, 1927
- Actia pamirica Richter, 1974
- Actia parviseta Malloch, 1930
- Actia pellex (Mesnil, 1953)
- Actia perdita Malloch, 1930
- Actia philippinensis Malloch, 1930
- Actia picipalpis (Mesnil, 1954)
- Actia pilipennis (Fallén, 1810)
- Actia pokharana Shima, 1970
- Actia pulex Baranov, 1938
- Actia quadriseta Malloch, 1936
- Actia radialis O'Hara, 1991
- Actia rejecta Bezzi, 1926
- Actia resinellae (Schrank, 1781)
- Actia rubiginosa (Mesnil, 1954)
- Actia rufescens (Greene, 1934)
- Actia russula Mesnil, 1977
- Actia siphonosoma Malloch, 1930
- Actia solida Tachi & Shima, 1998
- Actia sternalis O'Hara, 1991
- Actia takanoi Baranov, 1935
- Actia tarsata Richter, 1980
- Actia triseta (Mesnil, 1954)
- Actia vulpina (Mesnil, 1954)
- Actia yasumatsui Shima, 1970

The following species are unplaced in Siphonini:

- Actia panamensis Curran, 1933
