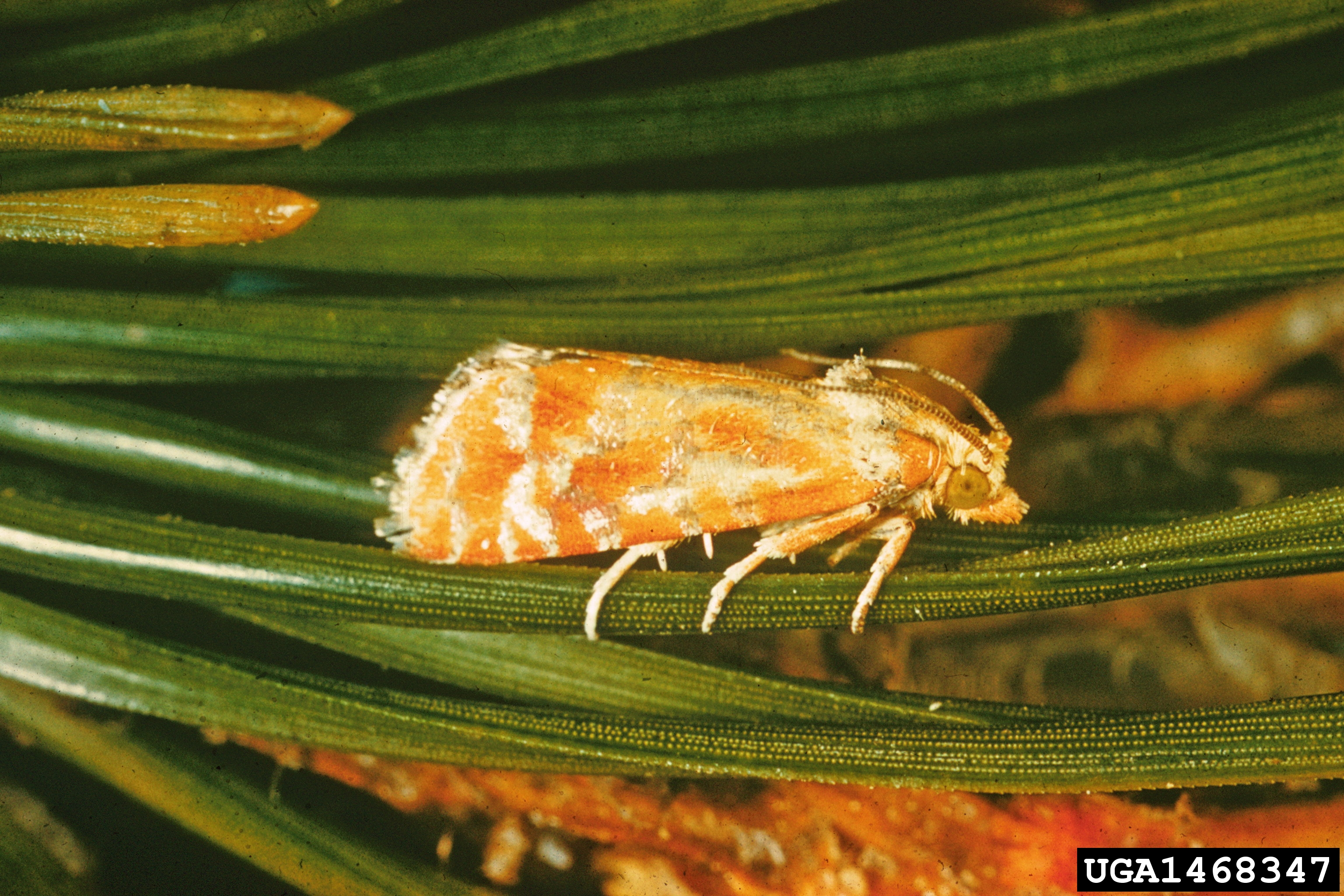

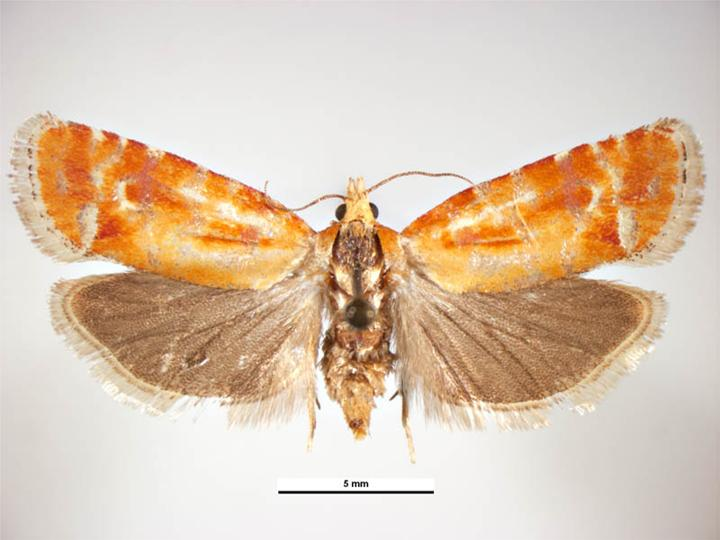
- Mounted female

Scientific classification
- Domain: Eukaryota
- Kingdom: Animalia
- Phylum: Arthropoda
- Class: Insecta
- Order: Lepidoptera
- Family: Tortricidae
- Genus: Rhyacionia
- Species: R. buoliana

Binomial name
- Rhyacionia buoliana (Denis & Schiffermüller, 1775)

Synonyms
- Tortrix buoliana [Denis & Schiffermuller], 1775; Tortrix bouliana Frolich, 1828; bouoliana Herrich-Schaffer, 1847; Rhyacionia buolina Neugebauer, 1950; Tortrix gemmana Hubner, [1818-1819]; Phalaena (Tinea) gemmatella Panzer, 1804; Phalaena (Tinea) herbstella Goeze, 1783; Rhyacionia buoliana milleri Agenjo, 1963; Tortrix pallasana Sodoffsky, 1830; Evetria buoliana relictana LeCerf, 1932; Rhyacionia buoliana riesgoi Agenjo, 1963; Rhyacionia buoliana robredoi Agenjo, 1963; Retinia thurificana Lederer, 1855

= Rhyacionia buoliana =

Species of moth

Rhyacionia buoliana, the pine shoot moth, is a moth of the family Tortricidae. It is native to North Africa, North Asia, and Europe, and invasive in North America and South America.

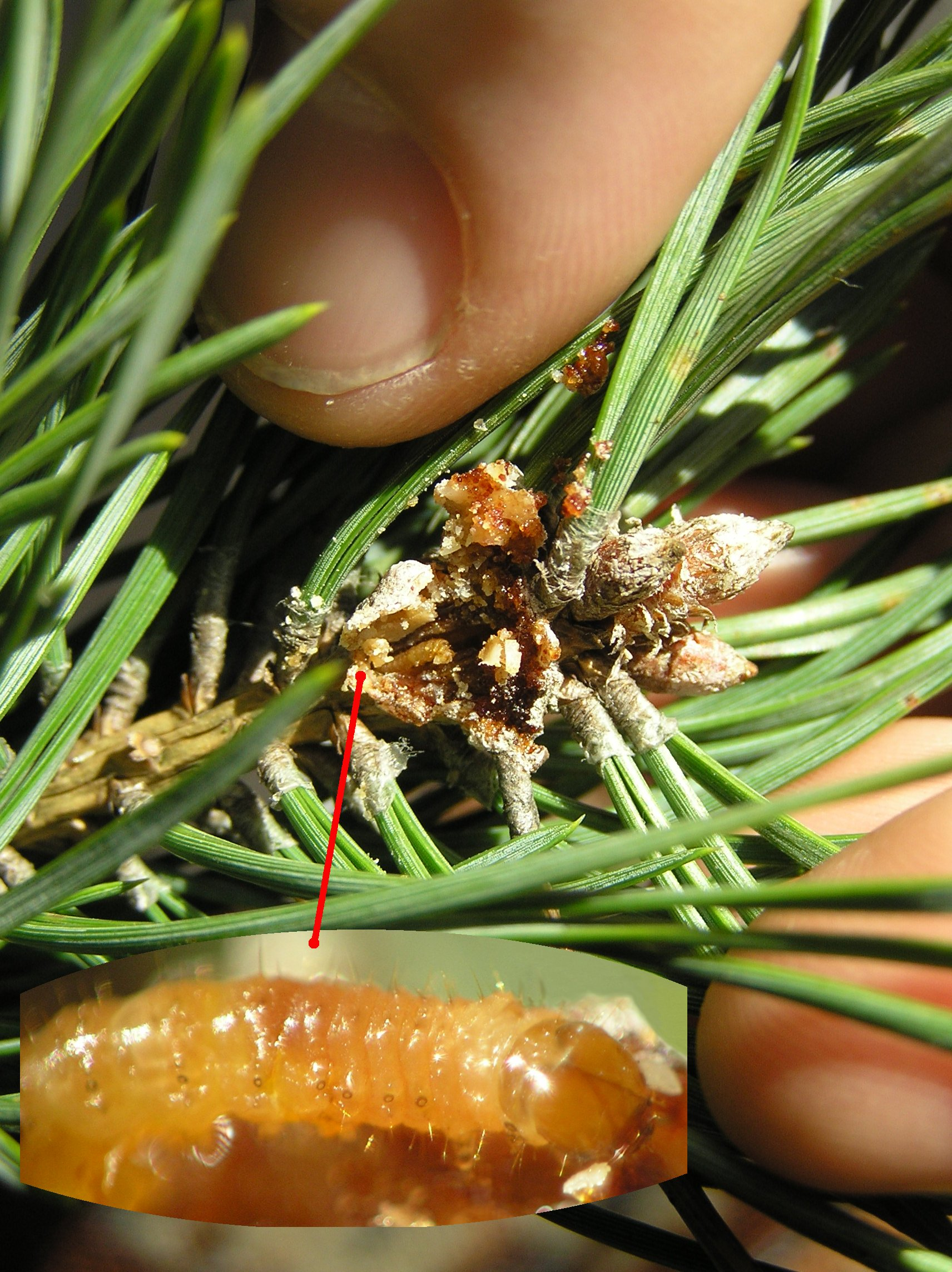
Caterpillar

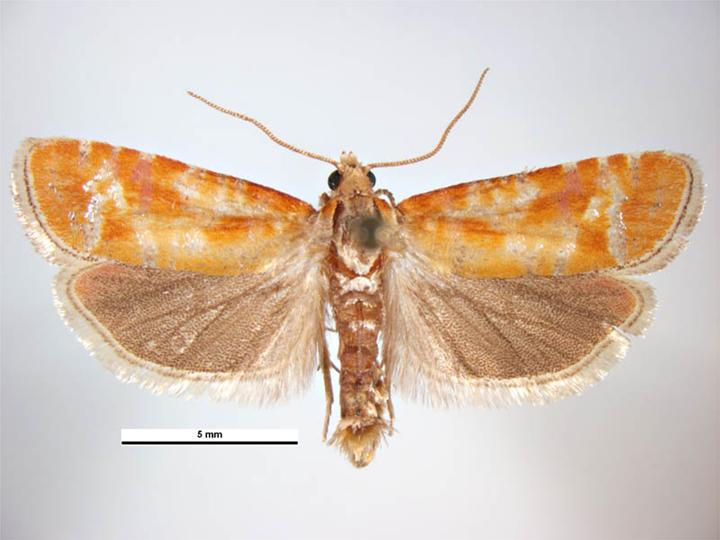
Mounted male

The wingspan is 16–24 mm. The forewings are ferruginous-orange, often partly suffused with dark red and with several irregular variable anastomosing metallic grey-whitish striae and costal strigulae. The hindwings are light grey. The larva is brown-reddish; head and plate of 2 black.

Adults are on wing from June to August in western Europe.

The larvae feed on pine. The original host plants are Pinus sylvestris and Pinus nigra.

== Subspecies ==
- Rhyacionia buoliana
- Rhyacionia buoliana thurificana (Lederer, 1855)

== Parasites ==
The larvae are attacked by the tachinid fly Actia nudibasis.
