= Actia nigroscutellata =

Scientific classification
- Kingdom: Animalia
- Phylum: Arthropoda
- Class: Insecta
- Order: Diptera
- Family: Tachinidae
- Genus: Actia
- Species: A. nigroscutellata

Binomial name
- Actia nigroscutellata Lundbeck, 1927

Synonyms
- Actia infantula Stein, 1924

Species of fly

Actia nigroscutellata is a species of tachinid flies in the genus Actia of the family Tachinidae. It is native to Northern Europe, mostly Scandinavia, where it is rare.
