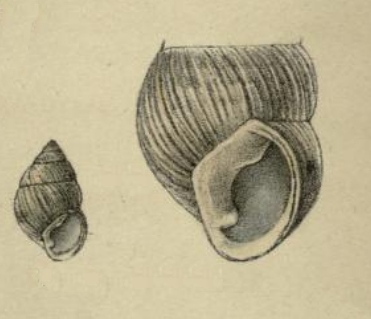
- Shell of Amastra antiqua

Scientific classification
- Kingdom: Animalia
- Phylum: Mollusca
- Class: Gastropoda
- Order: Stylommatophora
- Family: Amastridae
- Genus: Amastra
- Species: A. antiqua

Binomial name
- Amastra antiqua (Baldwin, 1895)

Synonyms
- Achatinella (Amastra) antiqua Baldwin, 1895 superseded combination; Amastra (Cyclamastra) antiqua (Baldwin, 1895) alternative representatio

= Amastra antiqua =

Species of mollusc

Amastra antiqua is a species of air-breathing land snail, a terrestrial pulmonate gastropod mollusc in the family Amastridae.

Subspecies

- Amastra antiqua antiqua (Baldwin, 1895)
- Amastra antiqua kawaihapaiensis Pilsbry & C. M. Cooke, 1914

== Description ==
The length of the shell attains 20 mm, its diameter 12 mm.

(Original description) The shell contains 6 whorls. The fossil shell is dextral, narrowly yet deeply perforated, with the perforation extending nearly to the apex. It is solid and elongately ovate, with a subacute apex. The surface is sculptured with coarse, irregular growth lines, while the apical whorls are smooth. The color of the living shell is unknown.

The shell consists of six convex whorls, separated by a well-impressed suture. The aperture is slightly oblique and sublunate. The peristome is thickened on the inner side, with the columellar margin adnate and slightly expanded over the umbilicus. The extremities of the peristome converge and are united by a thick parietal callosity. The columella is flexuous, ending in a narrow plait.

The sculpture consists of coarse, uneven wrinkles separated by finely and irregularly striated intervals. The embryonic shell appears smooth in the fossil specimens. The shell is narrowly umbilicate rather than "perforated", as previously described by Mr. Baldwin, with the umbilicus measuring nearly 1 mm in width.

The spire is slightly contracted near the summit. The peristome is obtuse and features a callous rib on the inner side. A low, oblique nodule or callous ridge is present on the parietal wall, situated some distance within and above, relatively close to the origin of the columella. In adult shells, the parietal callus is notably thickened at the edge.

== Distribution ==
This species is endemic to Hawaii, occurring on Oahu Island.
