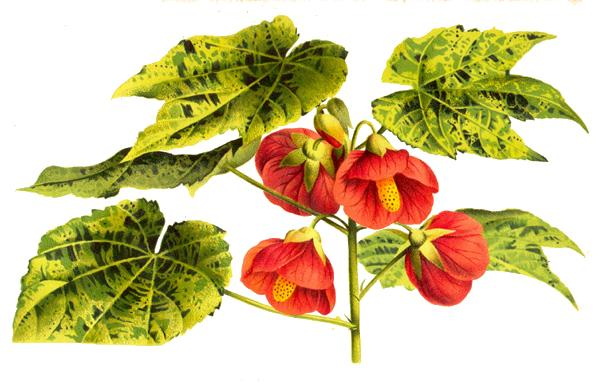

Scientific classification
- Kingdom: Plantae
- Clade: Tracheophytes
- Clade: Angiosperms
- Clade: Eudicots
- Clade: Rosids
- Order: Malvales
- Family: Malvaceae
- Genus: Callianthe
- Species: C. darwinii

Binomial name
- Callianthe darwinii (Hook.f.) Donnell

Synonyms
- Abutilon darwinii Hook.f. Abutilon darwinii var. trinerve Regel

= Callianthe darwinii =

Species of flowering plant

Callianthe darwinii is a shrub typically growing 2 m tall, native to Paraná and Santa Catarina states in southern Brazil. The flowers are pink.

== Uses ==
Callianthe darwinii is a popular ornamental plant in hot regions with a humid climate.
