= Anilara =

Scientific classification
- Kingdom: Animalia
- Phylum: Arthropoda
- Class: Insecta
- Order: Coleoptera
- Suborder: Polyphaga
- Infraorder: Elateriformia
- Family: Buprestidae
- Genus: Anilara; Saunders, 1868

Genus of beetles

Anilara is a genus of beetles in the family Buprestidae, containing the following species:

- Anilara acutipennis Théry, 1911
- Anilara adelaidae (Hope, 1846)
- Anilara aeraria Carter, 1926
- Anilara angusta Blackburn, 1891
- Anilara anthaxoides Théry, 1911
- Anilara antiqua Théry, 1911
- Anilara balthasari Obenberger, 1928
- Anilara blackburni Obenberger, 1928
- Anilara chalcea Obenberger, 1928
- Anilara convexa Kerremans, 1898
- Anilara doddi Carter, 1928
- Anilara hoscheki Obenberger, 1916
- Anilara laeta Blackburn, 1891
- Anilara longicollis Théry, 1911
- Anilara mephisto Obenberger, 1928
- Anilara nigrita Kerremans, 1898
- Anilara obscura (Macleay, 1872)
- Anilara olivia Carter, 1926
- Anilara pagana (Obenberger, 1915)
- Anilara planifrons Blackburn, 1887
- Anilara purpurascens (Macleay, 1888)
- Anilara quieta Obenberger, 1928
- Anilara strandi Obenberger, 1928
- Anilara subcostata Blackburn, 1891
- Anilara subimpressa Carter, 1936
- Anilara sulcicollis Kerremans, 1898
- Anilara sulcipennis Kerremans, 1898
- Anilara tibialis Obenberger, 1928
- Anilara victoriae Obenberger, 1928
- Anilara viridula Kerremans, 1903
