= Cotton bollworm =

Cotton bollworms are a significant pest of cotton. "A major pest in hot countries of irrigated crops. Enters into a summer diapause when irrigated crops are not present and the soil and air temperatures are high. When the end of the dry season comes, the rain cools the soil and pupae come out of diapause." (Nibouche 2004)

- Diparopsis castanea, red bollworm: central-southern Africa
- Earias insulana, spiny bollworm: Africa
- Helicoverpa zea, the American bollworm or tomato grub
- Helicoverpa armigera, the Old World bollworm
- Pectinophora gossypiella, pink bollworm: Africa
- Pectinophora scutigera, pink-spotted bollworm: Australia

== See also ==
- Bollworm
