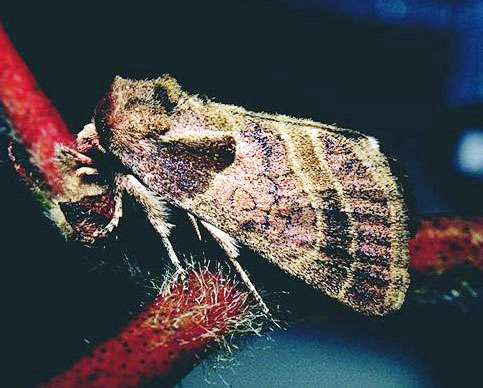
- Diparopsis castanea

Scientific classification
- Kingdom: Animalia
- Phylum: Arthropoda
- Class: Insecta
- Order: Lepidoptera
- Superfamily: Noctuoidea
- Family: Noctuidae
- Subfamily: Hadeninae
- Genus: Diparopsis; Hampson, 1902

= Diparopsis =

Genus of moths

Diparopsis is a genus of moths of the family Noctuidae, subfamily Hadeninae. It includes D. castanea, which is the type species and, known as the "red bollworm", is a significant pest of cotton crops in Africa.

== Species ==
The Catalogue of Life lists:

- Diparopsis castanea
- Diparopsis gossypioides
- Diparopsis perditor
- Diparopsis tephragramma
- Diparopsis watersi
