= Bollworm =

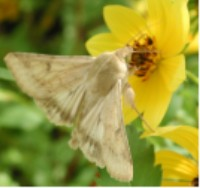
Helicoverpa zea

Bollworm is the common term for a moth larva that attacks the fruiting bodies of certain crops, especially cotton. The most common moths known as bollworms are:

- Red or Sudan bollworm, Diparopsis castanea
- Rough bollworm, Earias perhuegeli
- Spotted bollworm, Earias fabia
- Spiny bollworm, Earias insulana
- Spotted bollworm, Earias vittella
- American cotton bollworm or tomato grub, Helicoverpa armigera
- Cotton bollworm, Helicoverpa gelotopoeon
- Cotton bollworm, Helicoverpa punctigera
- Corn earworm, Helicoverpa zea
- Tobacco budworm, Heliothis virescens
- Pink bollworm, Pectinophora gossypiella
- Pinkspotted bollworm, Pectinophora scutigera

== See also ==
- Cotton bollworm
- Boll weevil, the beetle Anthonomus grandis
