= List of Abutilon species =

Abutilon is a genus of plants in the family Malvaceae. As of March 2026, Plants of the World Online accepted 178 species.

== A ==
- Abutilon abutiloides (Jacq.) Garcke ex Hochr.
- Abutilon affine (Spreng.) G.Don
- Abutilon albidum (Willd.) Sweet
- Abutilon alii Abedin
- Abutilon amplum Benth.
- Abutilon andrewsianum W.Fitzg.
- Abutilon andrieuxii Hemsl.
- Abutilon anglosomaliae Cufod. ex Thulin
- Abutilon angulatum (Guill. & Perr.) Mast.
- Abutilon anodoides A.St.-Hil. & Naudin
- Abutilon appendiculatum K.Schum.
- Abutilon arenarium C.T.White
- Abutilon arequipense Ulbr.
- Abutilon auritum (Wall. ex Link) Sweet
- Abutilon australiense (Hochr. ex Britten) Nimbalkar, Nandikar & Sardesai
- Abutilon austroafricanum Hochr.

== B ==
- Abutilon balansae Hassl.
- Abutilon bastardioides Baker f. ex Rose
- Abutilon benedictum Bunbury
- Abutilon berlandieri A.Gray
- Abutilon bidentatum (Hochst.) A.Rich.
- Abutilon bivalve (Cav.) Dorr
- Abutilon bracteosum Fryxell
- Abutilon buchii Urb.
- Abutilon burandtii Fryxell
- Abutilon bussei Gürke ex Ulbr.

== C ==
- Abutilon californicum Benth.
- Abutilon calliphyllum Domin
- Abutilon carinatum Krapov.
- Abutilon coahuilae Kearney
- Abutilon cryptopetalum (F.Muell.) Benth.
- Abutilon cunninghamii Benth.
- Abutilon cuspidatum Pittier

== D ==
- Abutilon densiflorum (Hook. & Arn.) Walp.
- Abutilon dinteri Ulbr.
- Abutilon dispermum (Hochr.) Fryxell
- Abutilon divaricatum Turcz.
- Abutilon dugesii S.Watson
- Abutilon durandoi Mattei

== E ==
- Abutilon eggelingii Verdc.
- Abutilon eremitopetalum Caum
- Abutilon erythraeum Mattei
- Abutilon eufigarii Chiov.
- Abutilon exstipulare (Cav.) G.Don

== F ==
- Abutilon falcatum A.St.-Hil. & Naudin
- Abutilon flanaganii A.Meeuse
- Abutilon fraseri (Hook.) Walp.
- Abutilon fruticosum Guill. & Perr.
- Abutilon fugax Domin
- Abutilon fuscicalyx Ulbr.

== G ==
- Abutilon galpinii A.Meeuse
- Abutilon gebauerianum Hand.-Mazz.
- Abutilon geranioides (DC.) Benth.
- Abutilon ghafoorianum Abedin
- Abutilon giganteum (Jacq.) Sweet
- Abutilon glabriflorum Hochr.
- Abutilon grandidentatum Fryxell
- Abutilon grandiflorum G.Don
- Abutilon grandifolium (Willd.) Sweet
- Abutilon grantii A.Meeuse
- Abutilon greveanum (Baill.) Hochr.
- Abutilon grewiifolium (Ulbr.) Krapov.
- Abutilon guineense (Schumach.) Baker f. & Exell

== H ==
- Abutilon haenkeanum C.Presl
- Abutilon haitiense Urb.
- Abutilon halophilum F.Muell. ex Schltdl.
- Abutilon hannii Baker f.
- Abutilon herzogianum R.E.Fr.
- Abutilon hirtum (Lam.) Sweet
- Abutilon hulseanum (Torr. & A.Gray) Torr. ex Baker f.
- Abutilon hypoleucum A.Gray

== I ==
- Abutilon ibarrense Kunth
- Abutilon inaequilaterum A.St.-Hil.
- Abutilon incanum (Link) Sweet
- Abutilon inclusum Urb.
- Abutilon indicum (L.) Sweet
- Abutilon insigne Planch.
- Abutilon itatiaiae R.E.Fr.

== J ==
- Abutilon jafrii F.Naseer, A.Noor & A.Rahman
- Abutilon julianae Endl.

== K ==
- Abutilon karachianum S.A.Husain & Baquar

== L ==
- Abutilon lauraster Hochr.
- Abutilon leonardii Urb.
- Abutilon lepidum (F.Muell.) A.S.Mitch.
- Abutilon leucopetalum (F.Muell.) Benth.
- Abutilon lineatum (Vell.) K.Schum.
- Abutilon listeri Baker f.
- Abutilon lobulatum Domin
- Abutilon longicuspe Hochst. ex A.Rich.
- Abutilon longilobum F.Muell.

== M ==
- Abutilon macrocarpum Guill. & Perr.
- Abutilon macropodum Guill. & Perr.
- Abutilon macrum F.Muell.
- Abutilon macvaughii Fryxell
- Abutilon malachroides A.St.-Hil. & Naudin
- Abutilon malacum S.Watson
- Abutilon malvifolium (Benth.) J.M.Black
- Abutilon mangarevicum Fosberg
- Abutilon mauritianum (Jacq.) Medik.
- Abutilon menziesii Seem.
- Abutilon micropetalum Benth.
- Abutilon minarum K.Schum.
- Abutilon mitchellii Benth.
- Abutilon mollicomum (Willd.) Sweet
- Abutilon mollissimum (Cav.) Sweet
- Abutilon mucronatum J.E.Fryxell
- Abutilon multiflorum R.E.Fr.
- Abutilon myrianthum (Planch. & Linden) Krapov.

== N ==
- Abutilon neelgherrense Munro
- Abutilon nigricans G.L.Esteves & Krapov.
- Abutilon nobile Domin

== O ==
- Abutilon orbiculatum (DC.) G.Don
- Abutilon otocarpum F.Muell.
- Abutilon oxycarpum (F.Muell.) F.Muell. ex Benth.

== P ==
- Abutilon pakistanicum Jafri & Ali
- Abutilon palmeri A.Gray
- Abutilon paniculatum Hand.-Mazz.
- Abutilon pannosum (G.Forst.) Schltdl.
- Abutilon parishii S.Watson
- Abutilon parvulum A.Gray
- Abutilon pedatum Ewart
- Abutilon pedrae-brancae K.Schum.
- Abutilon pedunculare Kunth
- Abutilon percaudatum Hochr.
- Abutilon permolle (Willd.) Sweet
- Abutilon persicum (Burm.f.) Merr.
- Abutilon picardae Urb.
- Abutilon pilosicalyx Verdc.
- Abutilon pilosocinereum A.Meeuse
- Abutilon pinkavae Fryxell
- Abutilon pitcairnense Fosberg
- Abutilon piurense Ulbr.
- Abutilon pritchardii Exell & Hillc.
- Abutilon procerum Fryxell
- Abutilon pseudocleistogamum Hochr.
- Abutilon pubistamineum Ulbr.
- Abutilon pycnodon Hochr.
- Abutilon pyramidale Turcz.

== R ==
- Abutilon ramiflorum A.St.-Hil.
- Abutilon ramosum (Cav.) Guill. & Perr.
- Abutilon ranadei Woodrow & Stapf
- Abutilon reflexum (Lam.) Sweet
- Abutilon rehmannii Baker f.
- Abutilon reventum S.Watson
- Abutilon roseum Hand.-Mazz.
- Abutilon rotundifolium Mattei

== S ==
- Abutilon sachetianum Fosberg
- Abutilon sandwicense (O.Deg.) Christoph.
- Abutilon schaeferi Ulbr.
- Abutilon schinzii Ulbr.
- Abutilon sepalum S.A.Husain & Baquar
- Abutilon simulans Rose
- Abutilon sinaicum Mattei
- Abutilon sinense Oliv.
- Abutilon somalense Mattei
- Abutilon sonneratianum (Cav.) Sweet
- Abutilon sphaerostaminum Hochr.
- Abutilon stenopetalum Garcke
- Abutilon straminicarpum Fryxell
- Abutilon subprostratum Verdc.
- Abutilon substellatum Phuph. & Poopath
- Abutilon subumbellatum Philcox
- Abutilon subviscosum Benth.

== T ==
- Abutilon tehuantepecense Fryxell
- Abutilon terminale (Cav.) A.St.-Hil.
- Abutilon theophrasti Medik.
- Abutilon thyrsodendron Griseb.
- Abutilon trisulcatum (Jacq.) Urb.
- Abutilon tubulosum (A.Cunn. ex Hook.) Walp.
- Abutilon turumiquirense Steyerm.

== U ==
- Abutilon umbelliflorum A.St.-Hil.

== V ==
- Abutilon venosum Lem.
- Abutilon virginianum Krapov.
- Abutilon viscosum (L.) Dorr

== W ==
- Abutilon whistleri Fosberg
- Abutilon wituense Baker f.
- Abutilon wrightii A.Gray

== X ==
- Abutilon xanti A.Gray
