= Earias fabia =

Scientific classification
- Domain: Eukaryota
- Kingdom: Animalia
- Phylum: Arthropoda
- Class: Insecta
- Order: Lepidoptera
- Superfamily: Noctuoidea
- Family: Nolidae
- Subfamily: Eariadinae
- Genus: Earias
- Species: E. fabia

Binomial name
- Earias fabia Stoll, 1781

Species of moth

Earias fabia, called the cotton spotted bollworm as a larva, is a moth of the family Nolidae. The species was first described by Caspar Stoll in 1781. It is sometimes included in the species Earias vittella.

Larval food plants are Gossypium hirsutum, Abelmoschus esculentus, Urena lobata, Brassica oleracea and Zea mays.
