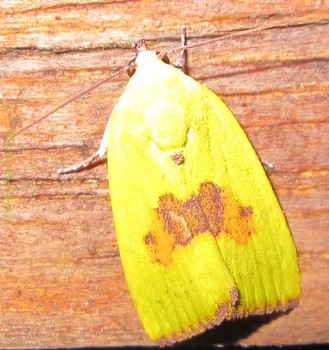
- Earias biplaga

Scientific classification
- Kingdom: Animalia
- Phylum: Arthropoda
- Clade: Pancrustacea
- Class: Insecta
- Order: Lepidoptera
- Superfamily: Noctuoidea
- Family: Nolidae
- Subfamily: Eariadinae
- Genus: Earias; Hübner, 1825

Type species
- Earias clorana (Linnaeus, 1761)

Synonyms
- Aphusia Walker, 1858; Digba Walker, 1862; Earis Stephens, 1834; Sinciana Strand, 1915

= Earias =

Genus of moths

Earias is a genus of moths in the monotypic subfamily Eariadinae of the family Nolidae. The genus was erected by Jacob Hübner in 1825. Species are found throughout Europe, Africa, Asia and Australia, some being agricultural pests such as bollworms.

== Description ==
Palpi upturned and second joint reaching vertex of head. Third joint porrect (extending forward) and varying in length. Antennae minutely ciliated in male. Forewings with veins 3 to 5 from near angle of cell, vein 6 from upper angle, and veins 7 to 9 stalked. Hindwings with veins 3 and 4 stalked, vein 5 absent, veins 6 and 7 from upper angle and vein 8 from center of cell.

== Species ==
Some species of this genus are:

- Earias albovenosana Oberthür, 1917
- Earias amseli Wiltshire, 1961
- Earias ansorgei Tams, 1930
- Earias apicebrunnea Warren, 1916
- Earias becqueti Berger, 1953
- Earias biplaga Walker, 1866
- Earias brevipennis Warren, 1916
- Earias clorana (Linnaeus, 1761)
- Earias chlorodes Meyrick, 1902
- Earias chlorophyllana Staudinger, [1892]
- Earias cupreoviridis (Walker, 1862)
- Earias dilatifemur Sugi, 1982
- Earias divisa Warnecke, 1940
- Earias fabia Stoll, 1971
- Earias flavida Felder, 1861
- Earias gigas Berio, 1956
- Earias glaucescens (Hampson, 1905)
- Earias ikondae Berio, 1974
- Earias insulana (Boisduval, 1833)
- Earias irkana Wiltshire, 1936
- Earias jezoensis Sugi, 1982
- Earias latimargo Hampson, 1912
- Earias luteolaria Hampson, 1891
- Earias malagasy Viette, 1969
- Earias mjoebergi A. E. Prout, 1926
- Earias novoguineana Bethune-Baker, 1906
- Earias nubica (Strand, 1915)
- Earias ogovana Holland, 1893
- Earias paralella Lucas, 1898
- Earias perhuegeli Holloway, 1977
- Earias pudicana Staudinger, 1887
- Earias punctaria Wileman, 1915
- Earias richinii Berio, 1940
- Earias rjabovi Filipjev, 1934
- Earias roseifera Butler, 1881
- Earias roseipes Filipjev, 1934
- Earias roseoviridis Sugi, 1982
- Earias ruficeps Warren, 1916
- Earias rufopunctata Bethune-Baker, 1906
- Earias subviridis Lucas, 1898
- Earias syriacana Bartel, 1903
- Earias syrticola Turati, 1926
- Earias uniplaga Bethune-Baker, 1906
- Earias vernana (Fabricius, 1793)
- Earias venus Gaede, 1937
- Earias venusta Warren, 1916
- Earias virgula Viette, 1969
- Earias viridangulata Mell, 1943
- Earias vittella (Fabricius, 1794)
- Earias waterstoni Wiltshire, 1947
