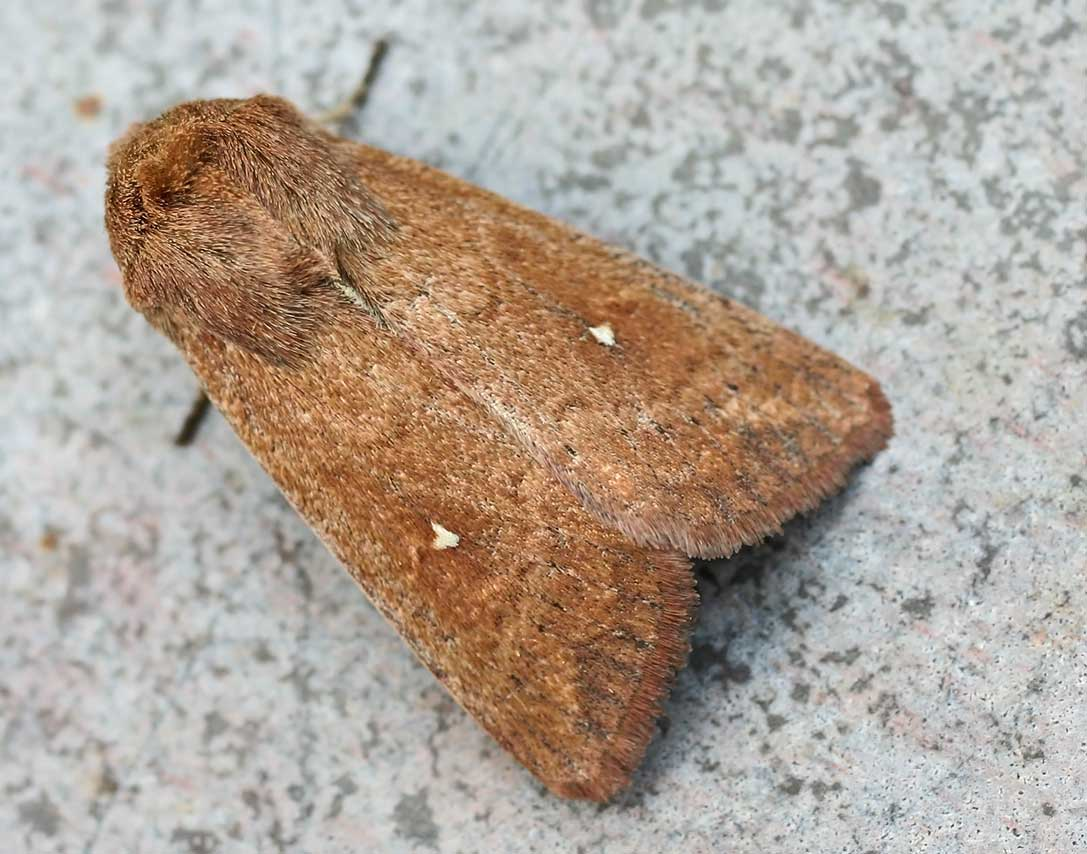
- Mythimna albipuncta

Scientific classification
- Domain: Eukaryota
- Kingdom: Animalia
- Phylum: Arthropoda
- Class: Insecta
- Order: Lepidoptera
- Superfamily: Noctuoidea
- Family: Noctuidae
- Subfamily: Noctuinae
- Tribe: Mythimnini

Genera
- Presently 6; see text

= Mythimnini =

Tribe of moths

The Mythimnini are a small tribe of moths in the Hadeninae subfamily. As numerous hadenine genera have not yet been assigned to a tribe, the genus list is preliminary.

== Genera ==
- Analetia
- Anapoma
- Leucania
- Mythimna
- Senta
- Vietteania
