= Vietteania =

Scientific classification
- Domain: Eukaryota
- Kingdom: Animalia
- Phylum: Arthropoda
- Class: Insecta
- Order: Lepidoptera
- Superfamily: Noctuoidea
- Family: Noctuidae
- Tribe: Mythimnini
- Genus: Vietteania; Rungs, 1955

Genus of moths

Vietteania is a genus of moths of the family Noctuidae described by Charles Ernest Edmond Rungs in 1955.

== Species ==
- Vietteania affinis (Warnecke, 1929)
- Vietteania catadela D. S. Fletcher, 1961
- Vietteania griveaudi Viette, 1979
- Vietteania pinna (Saalmüller, 1891)
- Vietteania pyrostrota (Hampson, 1907)
- Vietteania torrentium (Guenée, 1852)
