= Earias luteolaria =

Scientific classification
- Kingdom: Animalia
- Phylum: Arthropoda
- Class: Insecta
- Order: Lepidoptera
- Superfamily: Noctuoidea
- Family: Nolidae
- Subfamily: Eariadinae
- Genus: Earias
- Species: E. luteolaria

Binomial name
- Earias luteolaria Hampson, 1891

Synonyms
- Earias luteolaria ab. aurantiaca Strand, 1917; Earias luteolaria ab. carnea Strand, 1917; Earias aurantiaca Gaede, 1937; Earias carnea Gaede, 1937

Species of moth

Earias luteolaria is a moth of the family Nolidae first described by George Hampson in 1891. It is found in India, Sri Lanka, Borneo, Hong Kong and Australia.

== Description ==
Fore-wings are bright yellowish with brown spot centrally. Hind-wings are whitish with a rusty-coloured outer area. On the underside of the hind-wings, a brown spot is found centrally.
