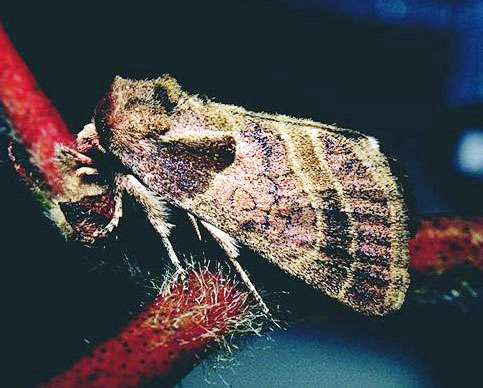
- Red bollworm moth

Scientific classification
- Domain: Eukaryota
- Kingdom: Animalia
- Phylum: Arthropoda
- Class: Insecta
- Order: Lepidoptera
- Superfamily: Noctuoidea
- Family: Noctuidae
- Subfamily: Hadeninae
- Genus: Diparopsis
- Species: D. castanea

Binomial name
- Diparopsis castanea Hampson, 1902

= Diparopsis castanea =

Species of moth

Diparopsis castanea is the type species of the genus Diparopsis: moths in the family Noctuidae; no subspecies are listed in the Catalogue of Life. This is known as the red bollworm, which is a significant pest of cotton crops in Eastern and Central-Southern Africa.

== Host Plants and Life cycle ==
Diparopsis castanea is oligophagous: being totally restricted to cultivated and wild cotton (Gossypium spp.), and a rare wild host plant: Cienfuegosia hildebrandtii (also in the tribe Gossypieae).

The sky blue eggs are laid singly on stems leaves and bracts and hatch in to larvae that rapidly seek out and penetrate seed capsules (i.e. bolls). The most effective chemical treatments against this pest include sprays that are directed against the eggs and first instar, because after this stage the larvae remain inside the bolls. The main infestation occurs during mid to late crop stage, and as the pupae can undergo diapause, the pest readily survives the dry season.

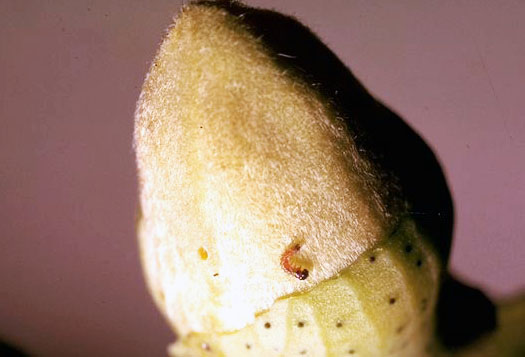
First instar on cotton bud

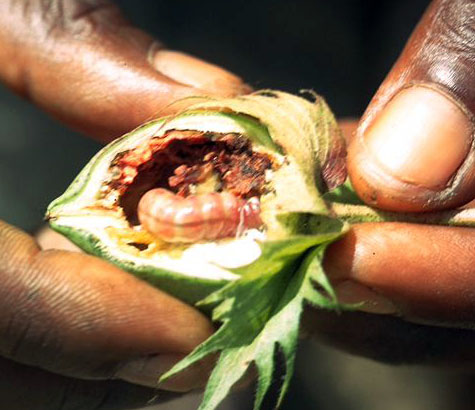

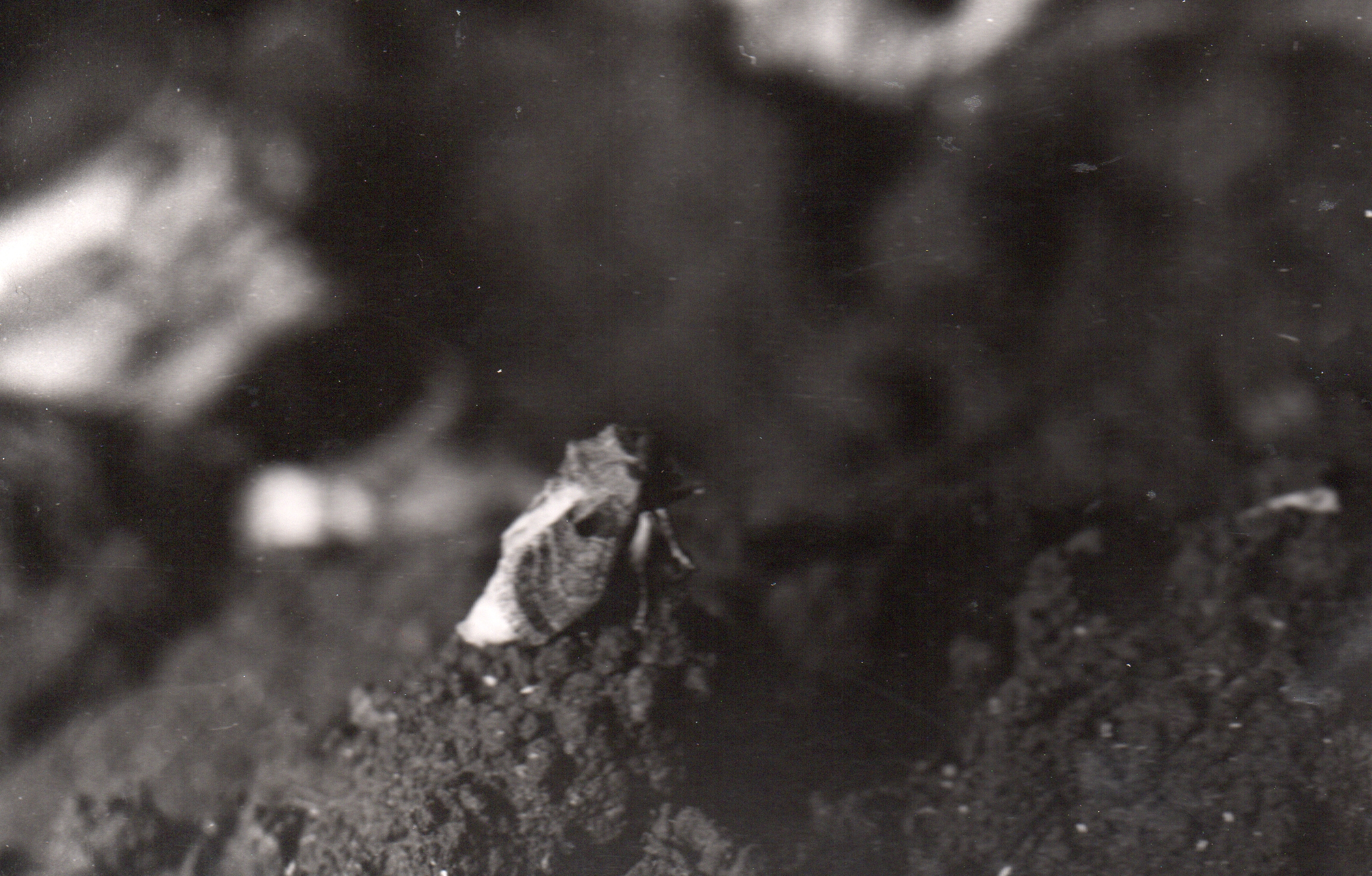
Diparopsis moth emerging

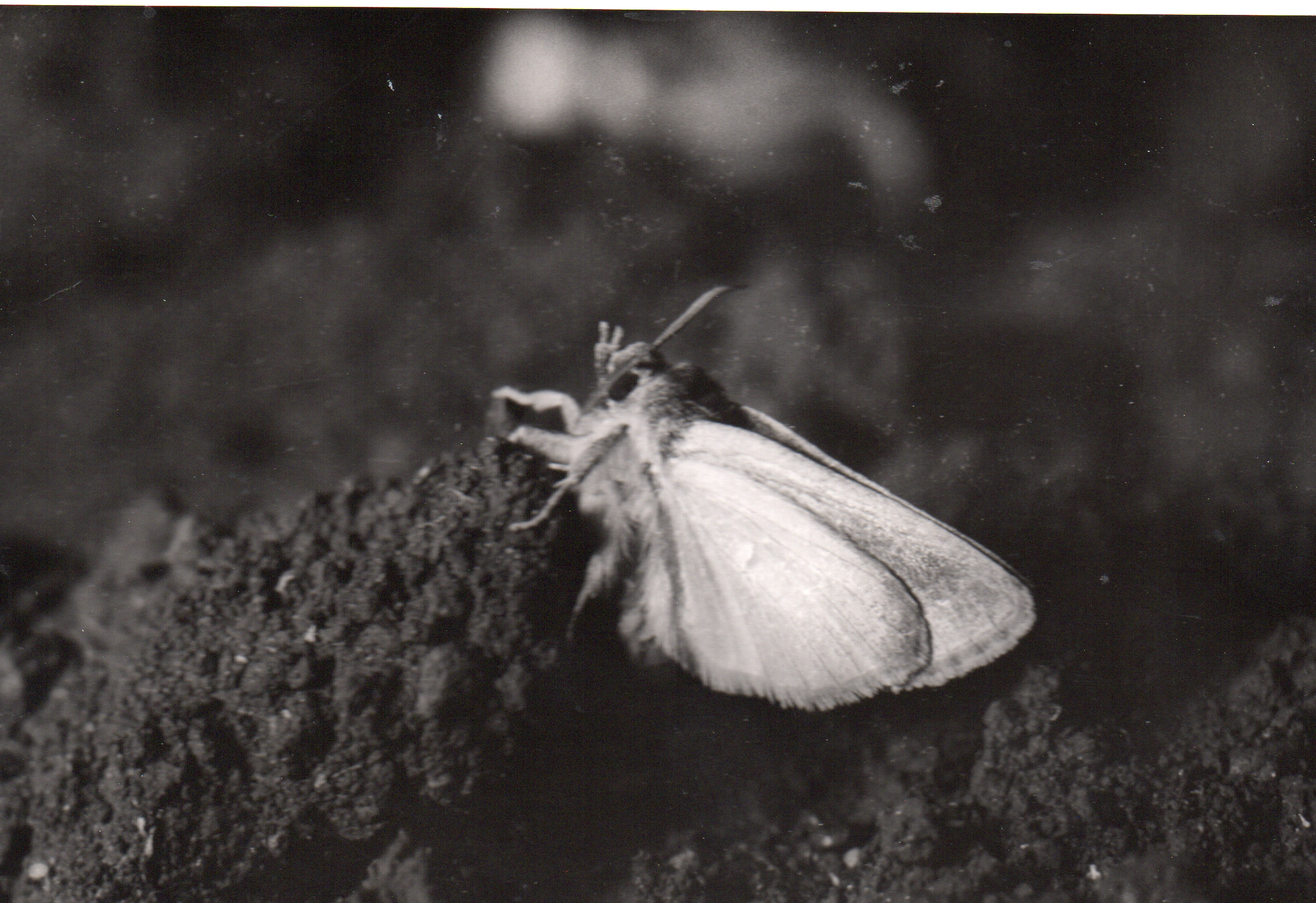

== Pest Status and Management ==
Integrated pest management includes implementation of a close season, during which farmers' fields must be cleared of all cotton plant material for at least two months; this has been mandatory in Zimbabwe since the 1930s and in Malawi since 1965. In the presence of a continuous supply of food plant material populations can increase and cause severe crop loss. Low level, persistent infestations represented by 1 egg observed for every 10 plants may cause significant losses; in Zimbabwe, the normal threshold is 6 eggs on 24 plants. Monitoring recommendations involve accumulating numbers of eggs over two or three consecutive counts.

Diparopsis is readily controlled by well-timed insecticide applications. Originally, chemicals such as DDT and carbaryl were recommended, but since the 1980s chemicals have included the pyrethroid insecticides. The eggs are more evenly distributed throughout the plant than Helicoverpa bollworms, so spray penetration is more important for effective treatment.
