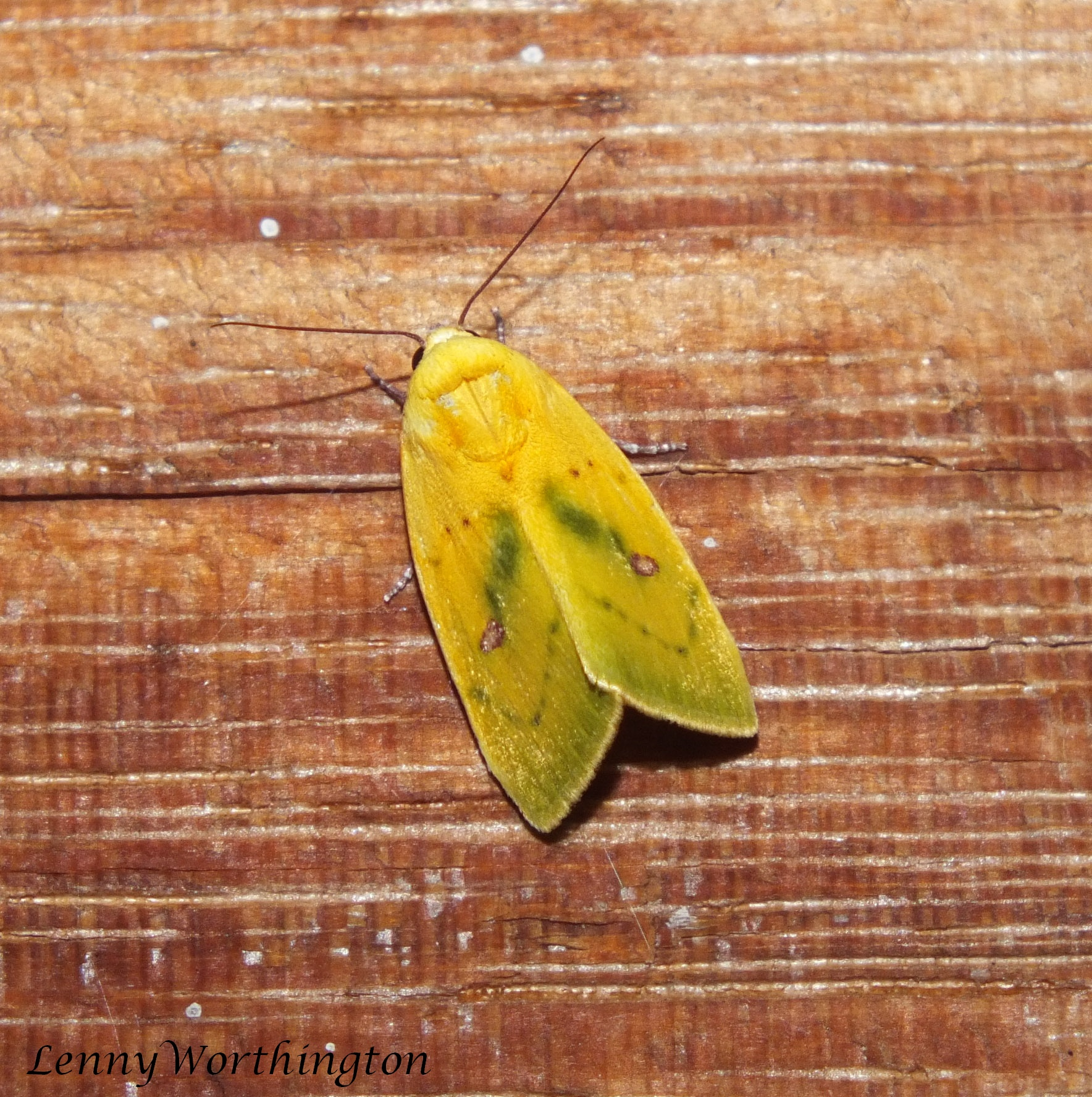

Scientific classification
- Domain: Eukaryota
- Kingdom: Animalia
- Phylum: Arthropoda
- Class: Insecta
- Order: Lepidoptera
- Superfamily: Noctuoidea
- Family: Nolidae
- Subfamily: Eariadinae
- Genus: Earias
- Species: E. flavida

Binomial name
- Earias flavida C. Felder, 1861

Synonyms
- Digba uninotata Walker, 1862; Earias annulifera Walker, 1866; Earias sulphuraria Moore, [1887]; Earias flavida ab. sauteri Strand, 1917

= Earias flavida =

Species of moth

Earias flavida is a moth of the family Nolidae. It was described by Cajetan Felder in 1861. It is found from the Indo-Australian tropics of India, Sri Lanka, Sumatra and Java to Samoa and Tonga.

== Ecology ==
The larvae feed on the buds and young fruits of Grewia species.
