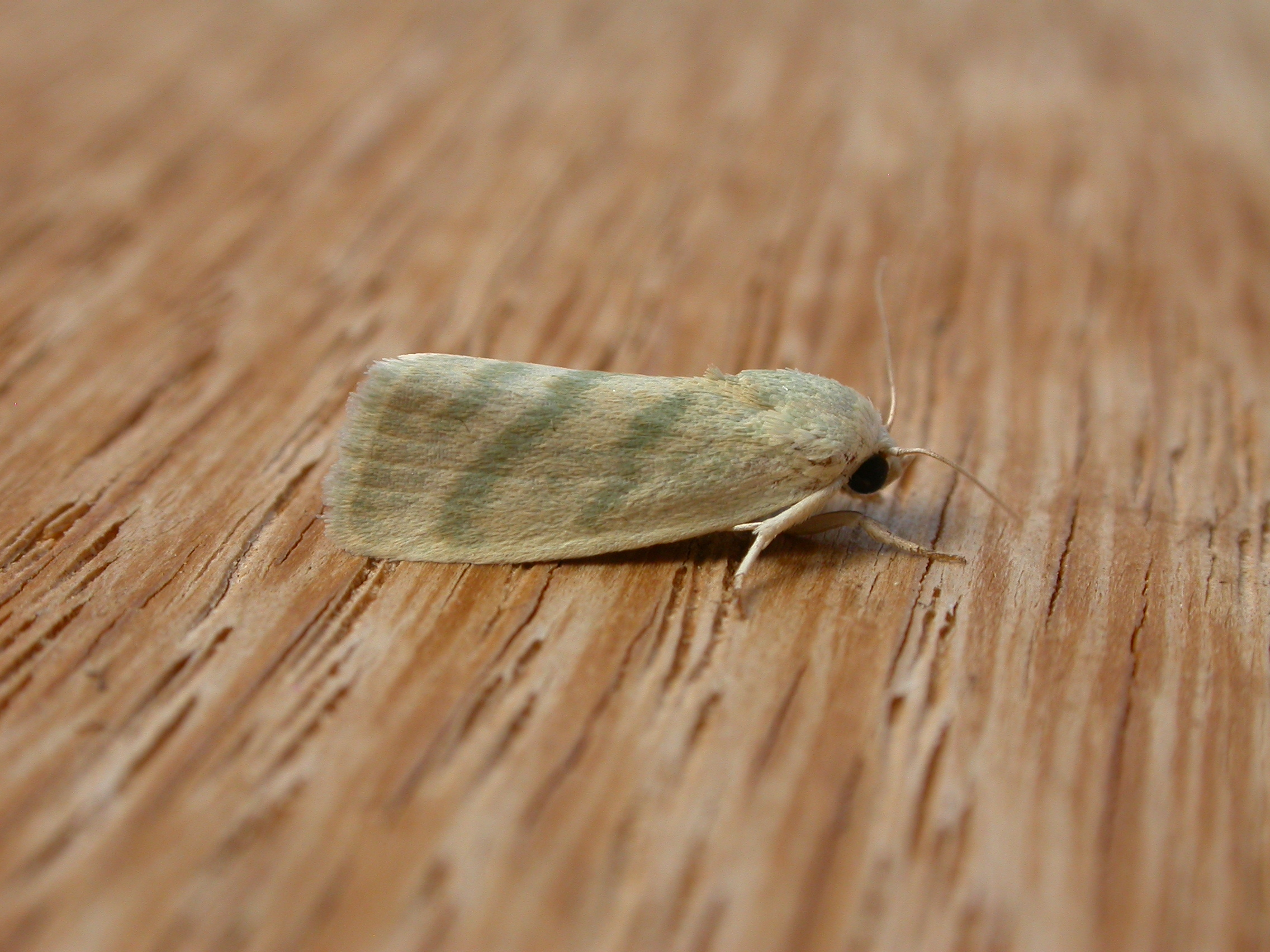

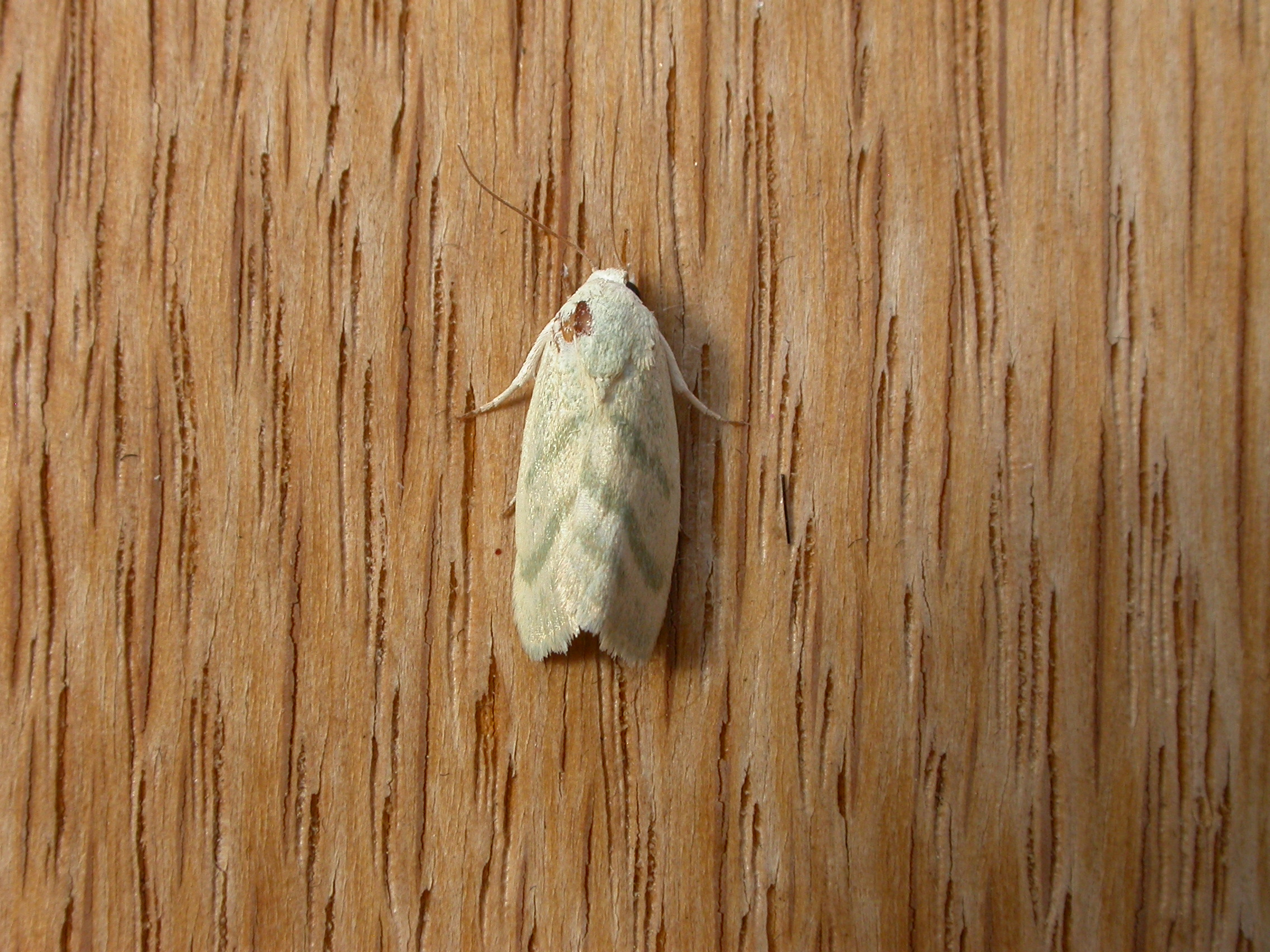

Scientific classification
- Domain: Eukaryota
- Kingdom: Animalia
- Phylum: Arthropoda
- Class: Insecta
- Order: Lepidoptera
- Superfamily: Noctuoidea
- Family: Nolidae
- Genus: Earias
- Species: E. paralella

Binomial name
- Earias paralella T.P. Lucas, 1898

Synonyms
- Earias parallela Hampson, 1912

= Earias paralella =

Species of moth

Earias paralella is a moth of the family Nolidae. It is known from Australia.

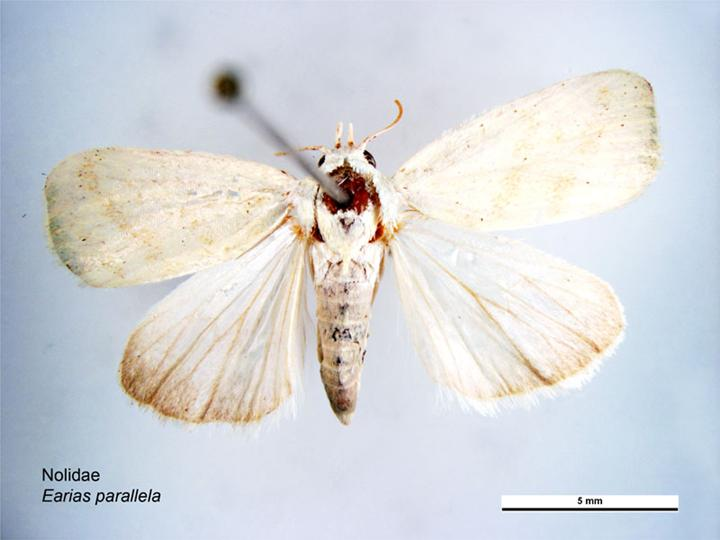
Dorsal view

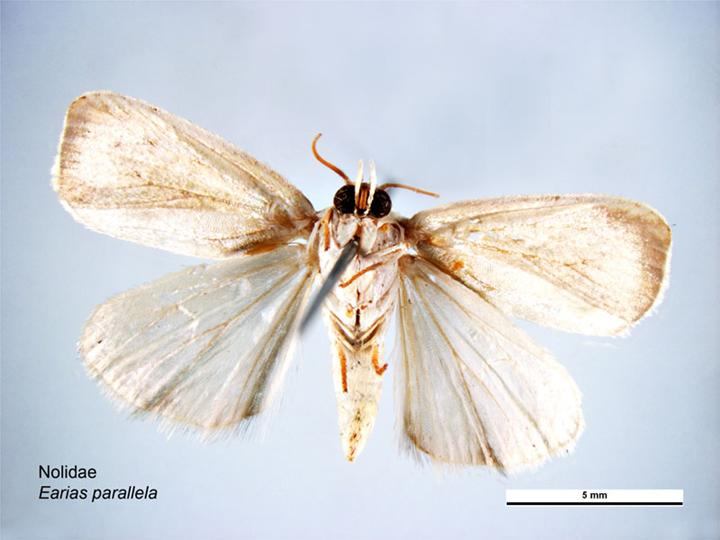
Ventral view
