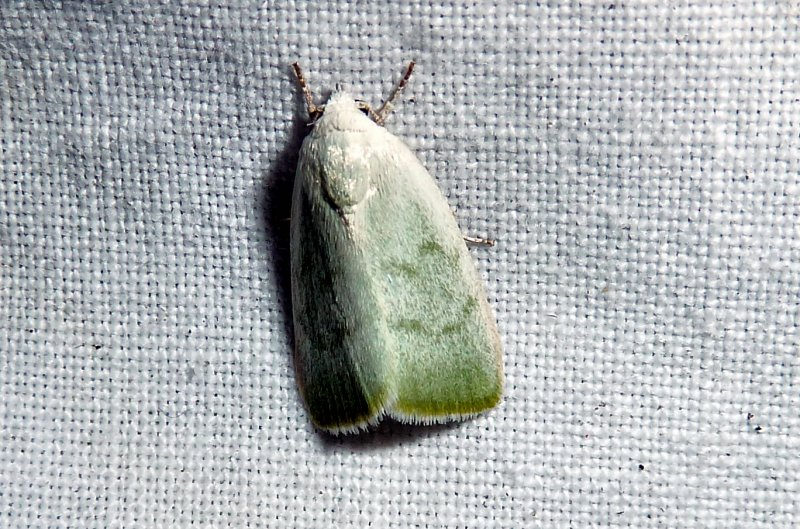

Scientific classification
- Kingdom: Animalia
- Phylum: Arthropoda
- Class: Insecta
- Order: Lepidoptera
- Superfamily: Noctuoidea
- Family: Nolidae
- Genus: Earias
- Species: E. vernana

Binomial name
- Earias vernana (Fabricius, 1787)

Synonyms
- Phalaena vernana Fabricius, 1787; Pyralis vernana

= Earias vernana =

Species of moth

Earias vernana is a species of moth in the family Nolidae first described by Johan Christian Fabricius in 1787. It is found in most of southern and central Europe.

The wingspan is 20–23 mm. Adults are on wing from May to mid August in one generation per year.

The larvae feed on Populus alba. They can be found from August to September.
