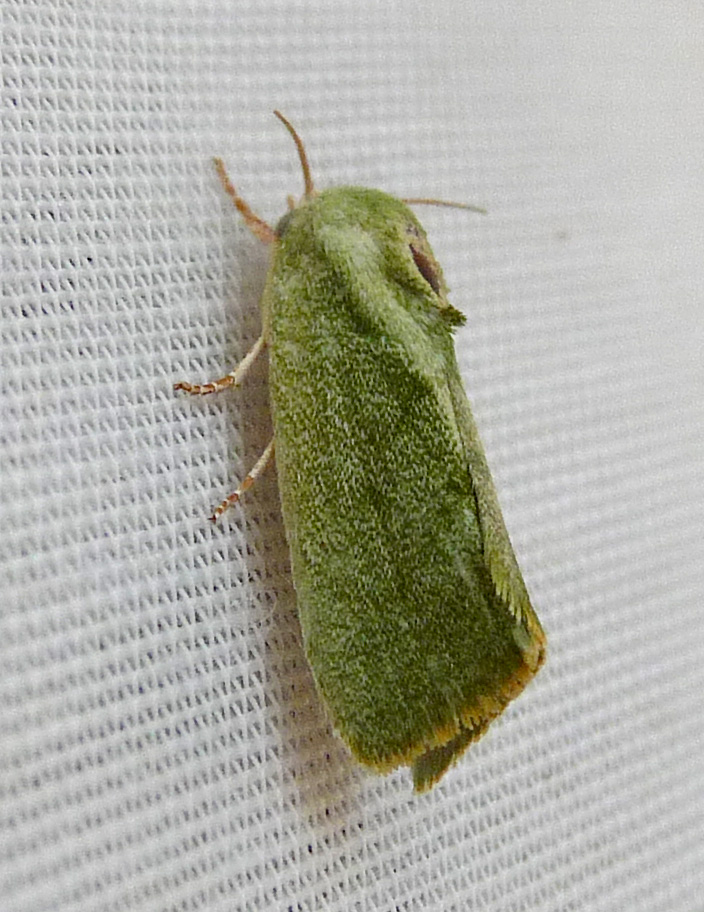

Scientific classification
- Domain: Eukaryota
- Kingdom: Animalia
- Phylum: Arthropoda
- Class: Insecta
- Order: Lepidoptera
- Superfamily: Noctuoidea
- Family: Nolidae
- Subfamily: Eariadinae
- Genus: Earias
- Species: E. insulana

Binomial name
- Earias insulana (Boisduval, 1833)

Synonyms
- Tortrix insulana Boisduval, 1833; Earias siliquana Herrich-Schäffer, 1851; Earias smaragdinana Zeller, 1852; Earias frondosana Walker, 1863; Acontia xanthophila Walker, [1863]; Earias simillima Walker, 1866; Earias anthophilana Snellen, 1879; Earias tristrigosa Butler, 1881

= Earias insulana =

Species of moth

Earias insulana, the Egyptian stemborer, Egyptian bollworm, spiny bollworm or cotton spotted bollworm, is a moth of the family Nolidae. The species was first described by Jean Baptiste Boisduval in 1833. It is found in most of Africa, southern Europe, the Near East and Middle East, Japan, Taiwan, the Philippines, Australia and Hawaii. It is a rare in immigrant in Great Britain.

The wingspan is 20–22 mm.

Full-grown larvae are 13–18 mm long and their wingspan is generally about 24–28 mm. It can be confused with the cream-bordered green pea (Earias clorana) or the spiny bollworm (Earias biplaga).

Pupation takes place in a felt-like cocoon, which is attached to dry leaves of the food plant or to plant debris on the ground. Typically, the pupal stage takes 9–15 days, but may extend to up to two months if development is delayed by low temperatures.
