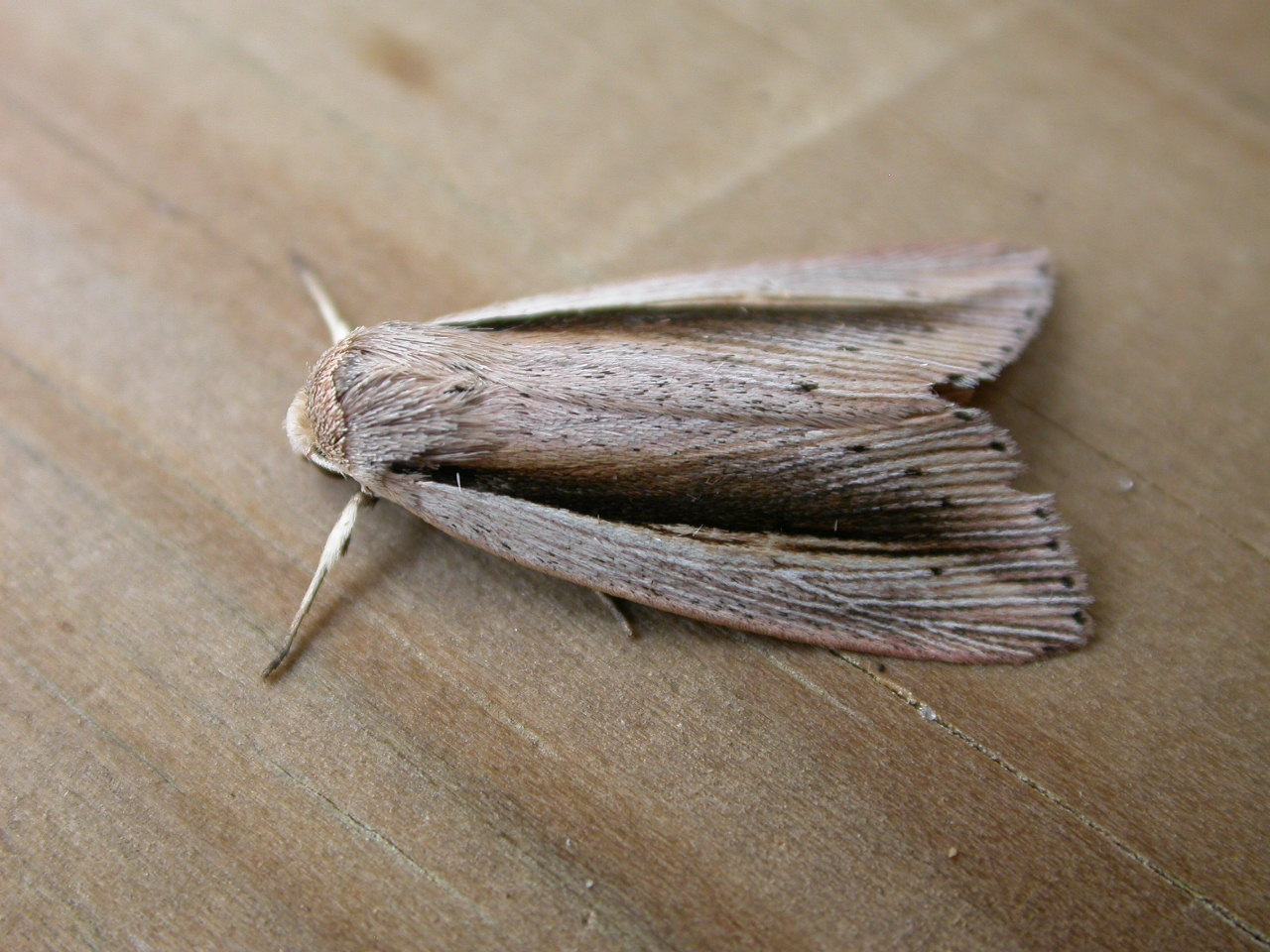

Scientific classification
- Kingdom: Animalia
- Phylum: Arthropoda
- Clade: Pancrustacea
- Class: Insecta
- Order: Lepidoptera
- Superfamily: Noctuoidea
- Family: Noctuidae
- Genus: Senta
- Species: S. flammea

Binomial name
- Senta flammea (Curtis, 1828)

Synonyms
- Mythimna flammea

= Senta flammea =

Species of moth

The flame wainscot (Senta flammea) is a species of moth of the family Noctuidae. It is found from Europe and across the Palearctic to Japan, but is not found on the Iberian Peninsula, the islands in the Mediterranean Sea, Greece and central and southern Italy.

== Technical description and variation ==
M. flammea Curt. (= dubiosa Tr., arundinicola Dbl.) (25 k). Forewing rufous grey speckled with brown along inner margin; paler grey with the veins white in costal third; middle third occupied by an olive brown streak widening and paling outwardly; the veins pale, the intervals brownish; an outer series of dark dots on veins: hindwing pale grey, the fringe white. — the form occurring in Amurland, stenoptera Stgr. is smaller, with the fore-wing still narrower, and the brown central streak more distinct. — Larva pale putty-colour; the lines pale with grey edges, the spiracular whiter. The wingspan is 32–40 mm.

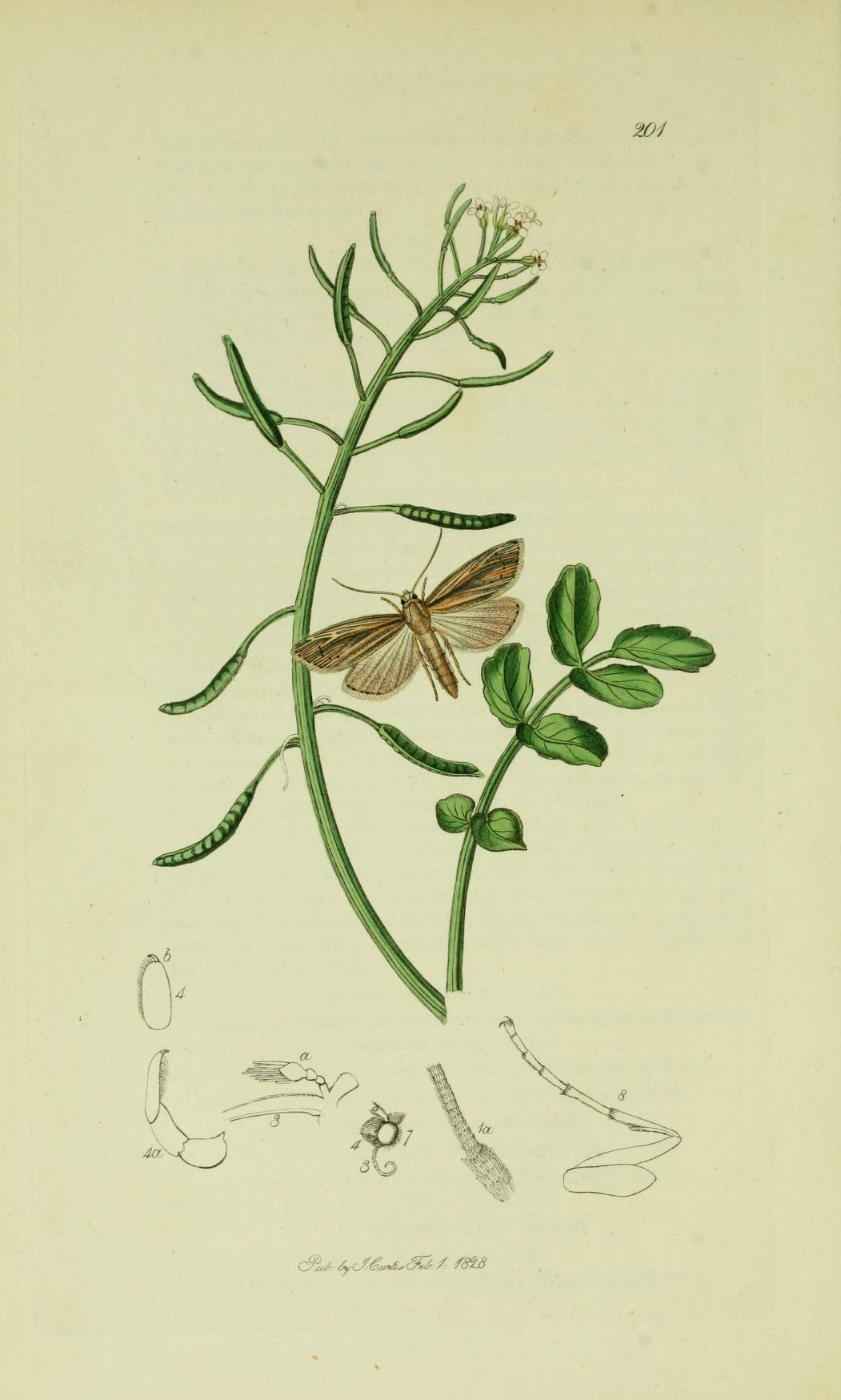
Illustration from John Curtis's British Entomology Volume 6

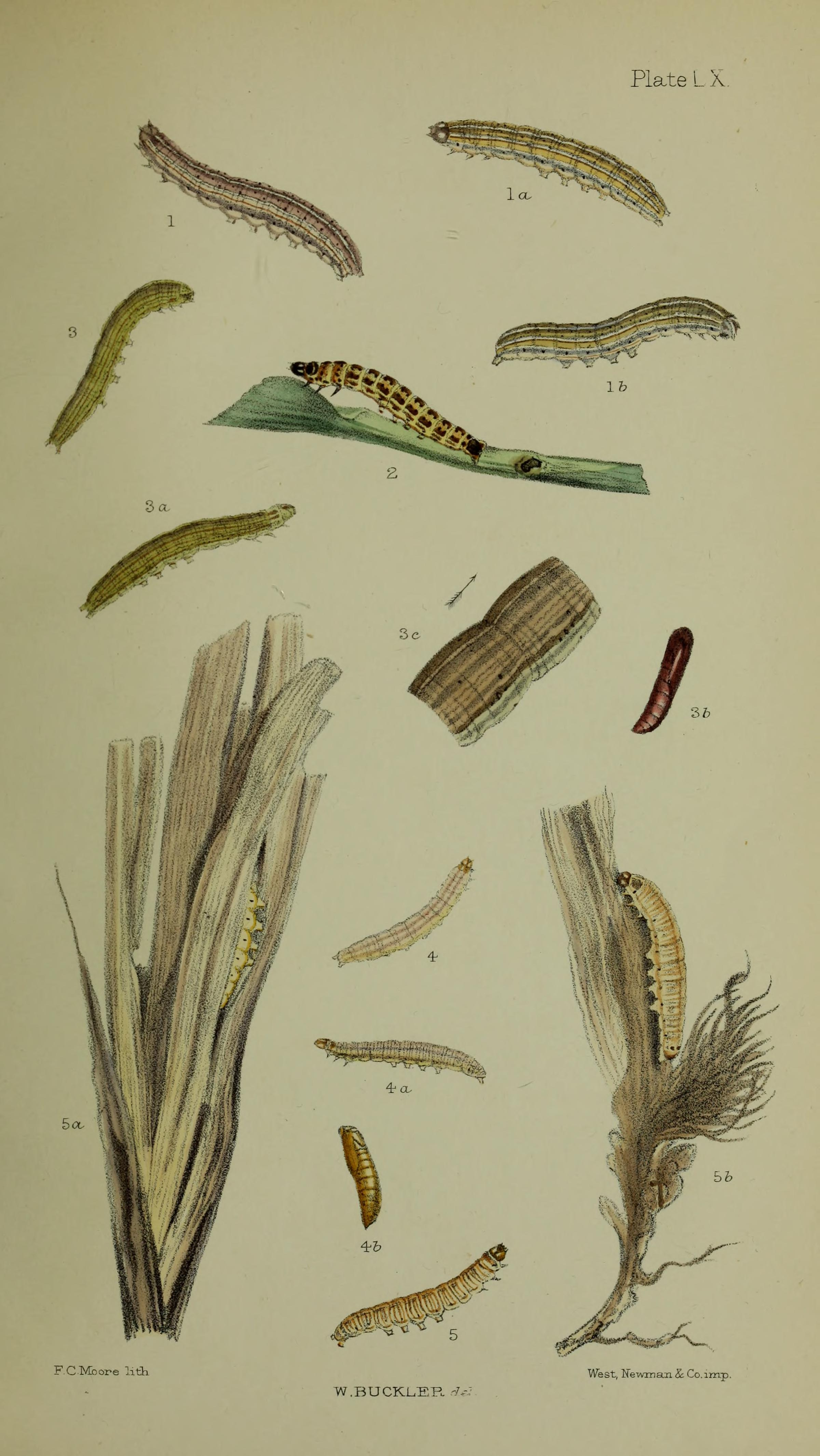
Figs 3, 3a larva after last moult 3c enlarged detail of two segments, 3b pupa

== Biology ==
The moth flies from May to June depending on the location.

The larvae feed on Phragmites, including Phragmites australis hiding by day and ultimately pupating in the old cut reedstems.
