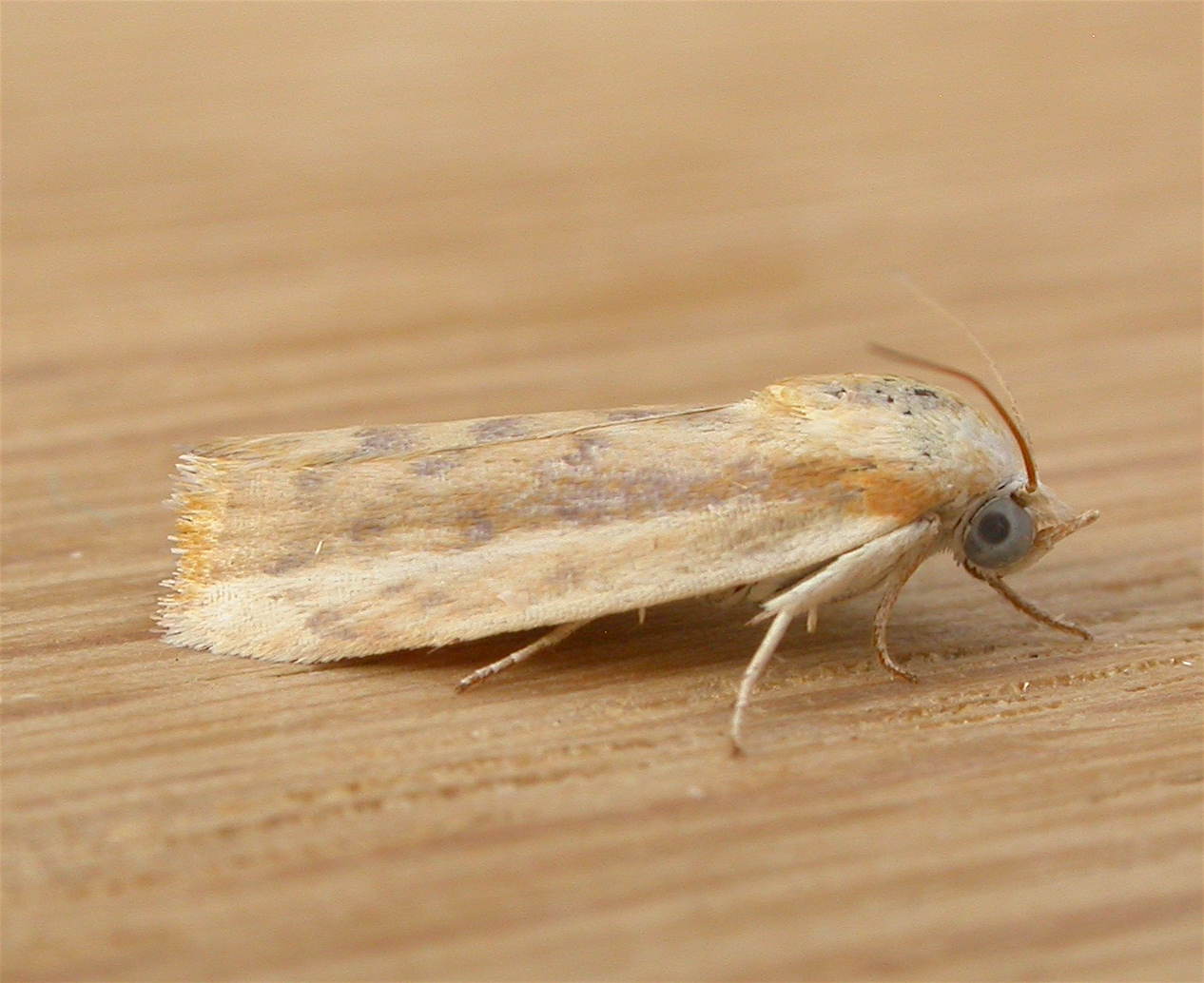

Scientific classification
- Kingdom: Animalia
- Phylum: Arthropoda
- Clade: Pancrustacea
- Class: Insecta
- Order: Lepidoptera
- Superfamily: Noctuoidea
- Family: Nolidae
- Subfamily: Eariadinae
- Genus: Earias
- Species: E. perhuegeli

Binomial name
- Earias perhuegeli Holloway, 1977

Synonyms
- Earias huegeliana

= Earias perhuegeli =

Species of moth

Earias perhuegeli, the rough bollworm, is a moth of the family Nolidae. The species was first described by Jeremy Daniel Holloway in 1977. It is found in the northern two-thirds of Australia and several islands in the South Pacific.

The wingspan is about 20 mm.

The larvae feed on Gossypium australe, Gossypium populifolium, Abutilon otocarpum, Abelmoschus ficulneus, Hibiscus trionum, Hibiscus panduriformis, Alyogyne hakeifolia and Adansonia gregorii, and are considered a pest of Gossypium hirsutum.
