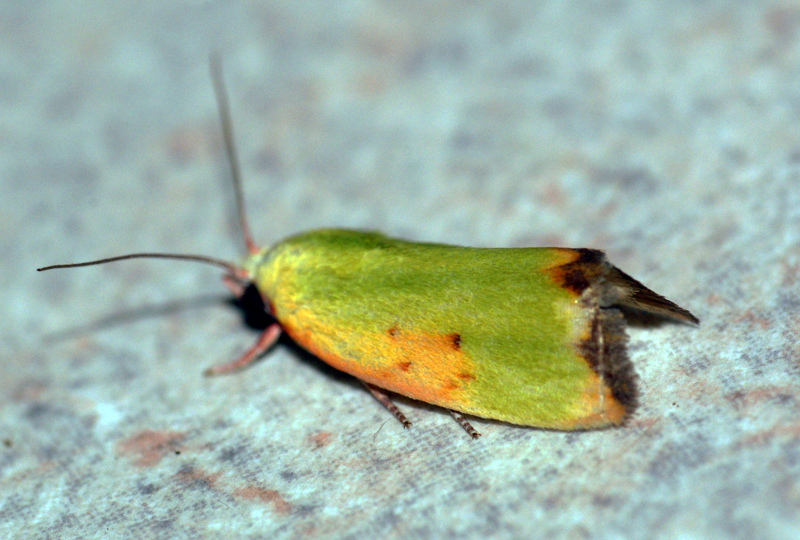

Scientific classification
- Kingdom: Animalia
- Phylum: Arthropoda
- Class: Insecta
- Order: Lepidoptera
- Superfamily: Noctuoidea
- Family: Nolidae
- Genus: Earias
- Species: E. cupreoviridis

Binomial name
- Earias cupreoviridis (Walker, 1862)

Synonyms
- Xanthoptera? cupreoviridis Walker, 1862; Earias? chromataria Walker, 1863; Earias fulvidana Wallengren, 1863; Eariasxe fervida Walker, 1866; Earias limbana Snellen, 1879; Earias cupreoviridis decolorata Warren, 1913; Earias cupreoviridis Walker; Kobes, 1997

= Earias cupreoviridis =

Species of moth

Earias cupreoviridis, called the cupreous bollworm as a larva, is a moth of the family Nolidae. The species was first described by Francis Walker in 1862. It is found in African countries like Botswana, the Democratic Republic of the Congo, Eritrea, Ethiopia, the Gambia, Kenya, Nigeria, Sierra Leone, South Africa, Togo, Uganda, Zimbabwe to Asian countries like India, Sri Lanka, China, Japan, Korea, Philippines, Indonesia and Hong Kong.

== Description ==
The wingspan of the adult is 21 mm. Palpi pinkish. Head and thorax pale greenish. Forewings pale green with two reddish-brown specks towards the end of the cell. Basal part of costa suffused with pinkish yellow. There is a brownish irregular marginal band with a yellowish inner edge. Abdomen and hindwings pure white. The caterpillar is pale pinkish brown with olive-green speckles. Anterior tubercles are orange colored and the later are pinkish brown. There are jet-black spots above the spiracles.

Larval food plants are Abelmoschus esculentus, Diospyros, Gossypium, Grewia tiliaefolia, Corchorus, Hibiscus, Kydia calycina, Malvastrum coromandelianum, Oryza sativa and Sida cordifolia.
