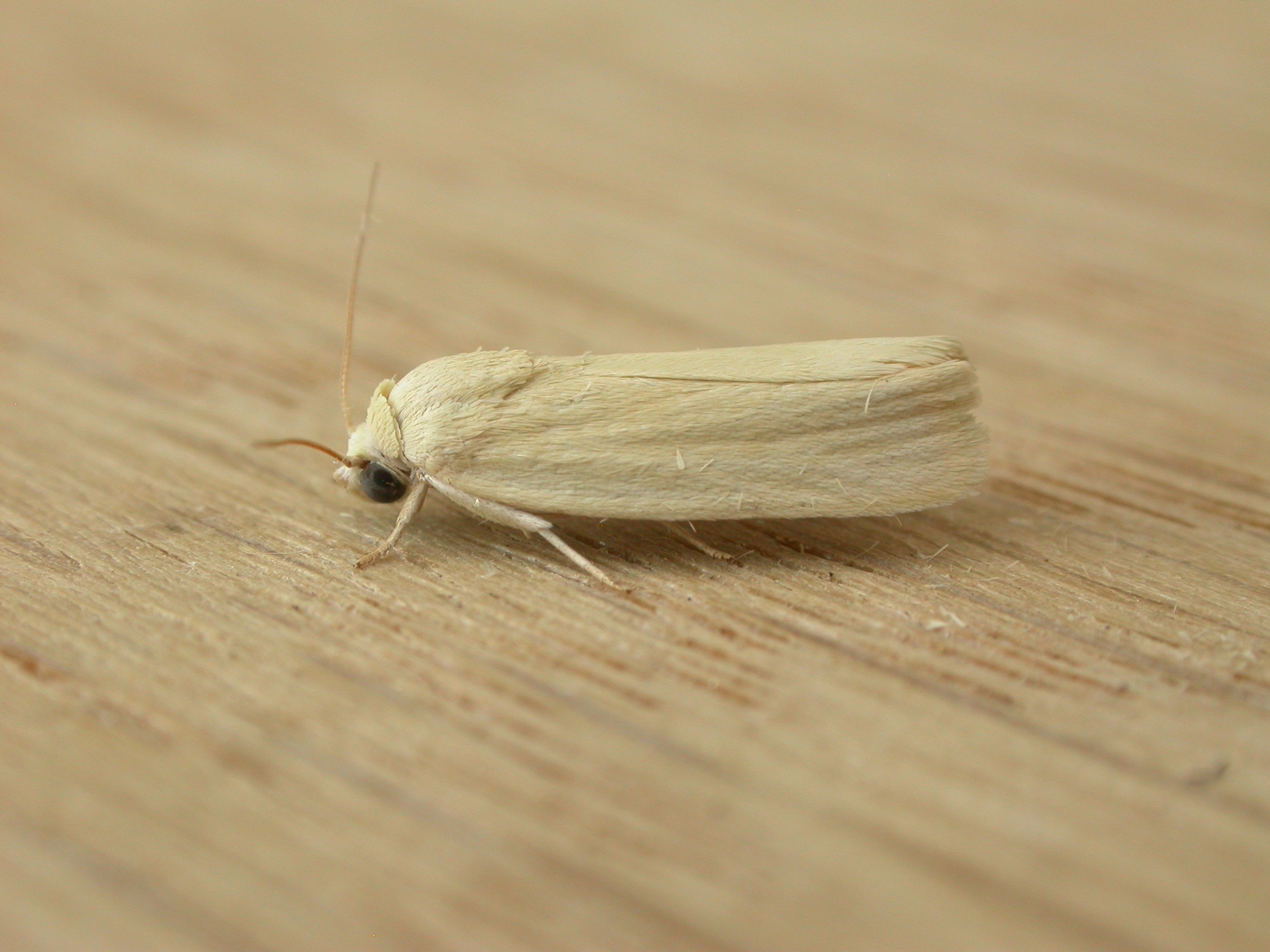

Scientific classification
- Kingdom: Animalia
- Phylum: Arthropoda
- Class: Insecta
- Order: Lepidoptera
- Superfamily: Noctuoidea
- Family: Nolidae
- Genus: Earias
- Species: E. chlorodes

Binomial name
- Earias chlorodes Meyrick, 1902

Synonyms
- Earias ochrophylla

= Earias chlorodes =

Species of moth

Earias chlorodes is a moth of the family Nolidae. It is found along the eastern coast of Australia, from Cooktown to Sydney.

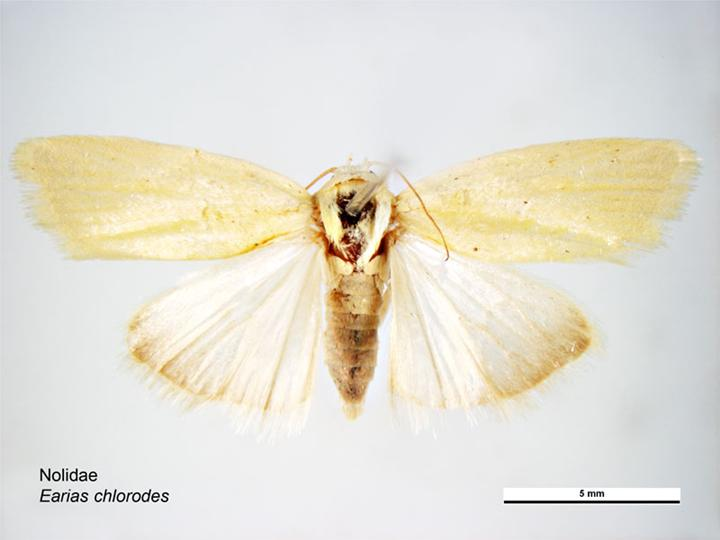
Dorsal view

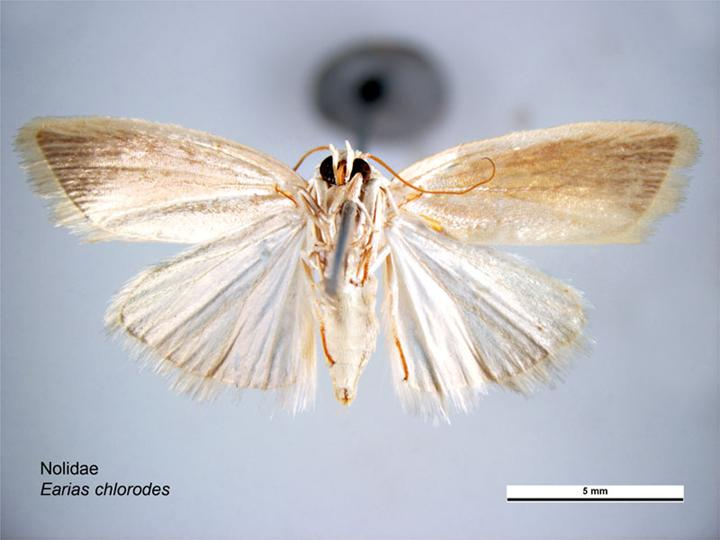
Ventral view

The wingspan is about 20 mm.
