= Pectinophora endema =

Scientific classification
- Domain: Eukaryota
- Kingdom: Animalia
- Phylum: Arthropoda
- Class: Insecta
- Order: Lepidoptera
- Family: Gelechiidae
- Genus: Pectinophora
- Species: P. endema

Binomial name
- Pectinophora endema Common, 1958

Species of moth

Pectinophora endema is a moth of the family Gelechiidae. It was described by Ian Francis Bell Common in 1958. It is found in Australia, where it has been recorded from Queensland and New South Wales.

The larvae have been recorded feeding on the seed capsules of Hibiscus species, including Hibiscus divaricatus, Hibiscus heterophyllus and Hibiscus diversifolius. Pupation takes place in the fruit of this host plant. The larvae are bright red.
