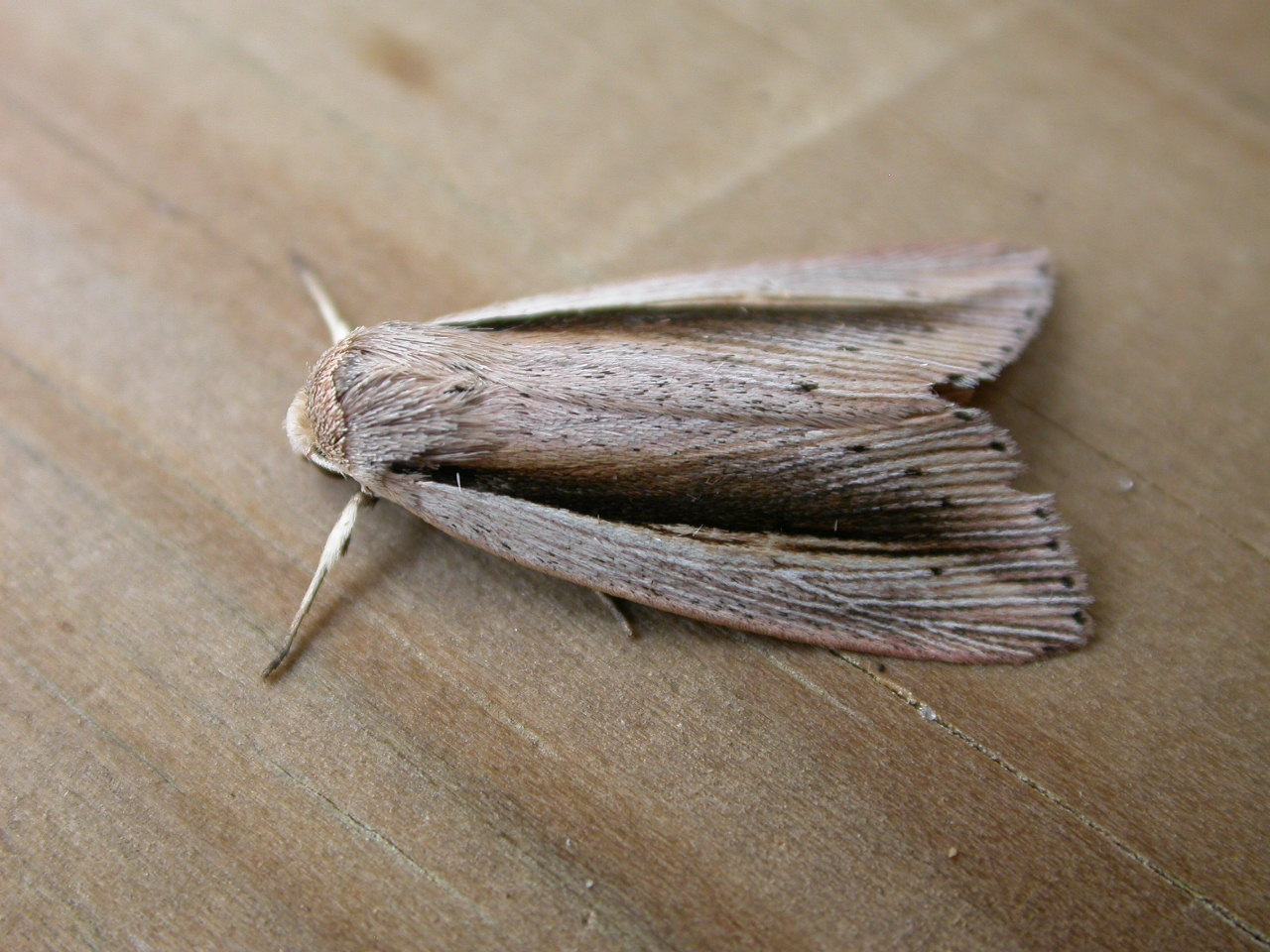
- Senta flammea

Scientific classification
- Domain: Eukaryota
- Kingdom: Animalia
- Phylum: Arthropoda
- Class: Insecta
- Order: Lepidoptera
- Superfamily: Noctuoidea
- Family: Noctuidae
- Tribe: Mythimnini
- Genus: Senta; Stephens, 1834

= Senta (moth) =

Genus of moths

Senta is a genus of moths of the family Noctuidae.

== Species ==
- Senta flammea (Curtis, 1828)
- Senta lunulata (Gaede, 1916)
