= Analetia =

Scientific classification
- Domain: Eukaryota
- Kingdom: Animalia
- Phylum: Arthropoda
- Class: Insecta
- Order: Lepidoptera
- Superfamily: Noctuoidea
- Family: Noctuidae
- Tribe: Mythimnini
- Genus: Analetia; Calora, 1966

Genus of moths

Analetia is a genus of moths of the family Noctuidae.

== Species ==
- Analetia micacea (Hampson, 1891)
