= Vietteania pinna =

Scientific classification
- Kingdom: Animalia
- Phylum: Arthropoda
- Clade: Pancrustacea
- Class: Insecta
- Order: Lepidoptera
- Superfamily: Noctuoidea
- Family: Noctuidae
- Genus: Vietteania
- Species: V. pinna

Binomial name
- Vietteania pinna (Saalmüller, 1891)

Synonyms
- Leucania pinna Saalmüller, 1891; Borolia longirostris (Berio, 1940); Leucania pauliani Rungs, 1956

Species of moth

Vietteania pinna is a moth of the family Noctuidae. It is found in Africa and its presence has been recorded in Congo, Eritrea, Madagascar and Tanzania.

It has a wingspan of 29mm.
