= Pectinophora fusculella =

Scientific classification
- Kingdom: Animalia
- Phylum: Arthropoda
- Clade: Pancrustacea
- Class: Insecta
- Order: Lepidoptera
- Family: Gelechiidae
- Genus: Pectinophora
- Species: P. fusculella

Binomial name
- Pectinophora fusculella (Pagenstecher, 1900)

Synonyms
- Gelechia fusculella Pagenstecher, 1900

Species of moth

Pectinophora fusculella is a moth of the family Gelechiidae. It was described by Arnold Pagenstecher in 1900. It is found on the Bismarck Archipelago.

The wingspan is 25–28 mm. The forewings are shining chestnut-brown with ill-defined groups of scales, forming medial and postmedial bands. The hindwings are lighter brown.
