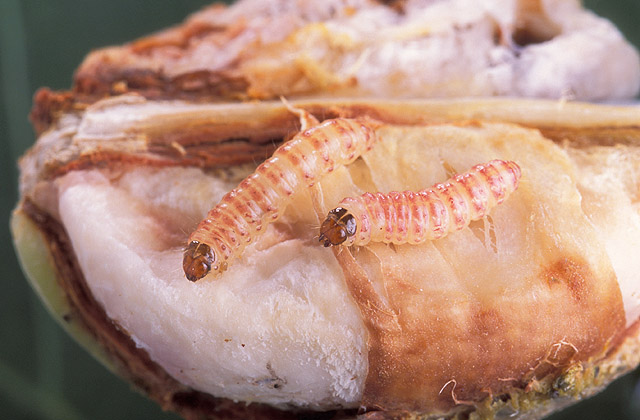
- Pink bollworm larvae

Scientific classification
- Kingdom: Animalia
- Phylum: Arthropoda
- Class: Insecta
- Order: Lepidoptera
- Family: Gelechiidae
- Subfamily: Apatetrinae
- Genus: Pectinophora; Busck, 1917

= Pectinophora =

Genus of moths

Pectinophora is a genus of moths in the family Gelechiidae. Perhaps the best known species is the pink bollworm, Pectinophora gossypiella (Saunders). P. gossypiella is one of the world's most destructive insect pests that causes terrible damage to cotton bolls. The larvae (caterpillars) bore into the bolls, causing them to fall or the blossoms to fail to open. The larvae tunnel through the immature lint and into the seeds eating them. As a result, the lint may be unpickable or so stunted as to greatly lower the yield and grade. The yield of oil from the seeds is greatly reduced. Double seeds are found when the cotton is gained, two partly eaten seeds being fastened together.

== Species ==
Species of this genus include:

- Pectinophora endema Common, 1958 (from Australia)
- Pectinophora fusculella (Pagenstecher, 1900) (from New Guinea)
- Pectinophora gossypiella (Saunders 1844) (paleotropical distribution) - pink bollworm
- Pectinophora scutigera (Holdaway, 1926) (from Australia/New Guinea)
