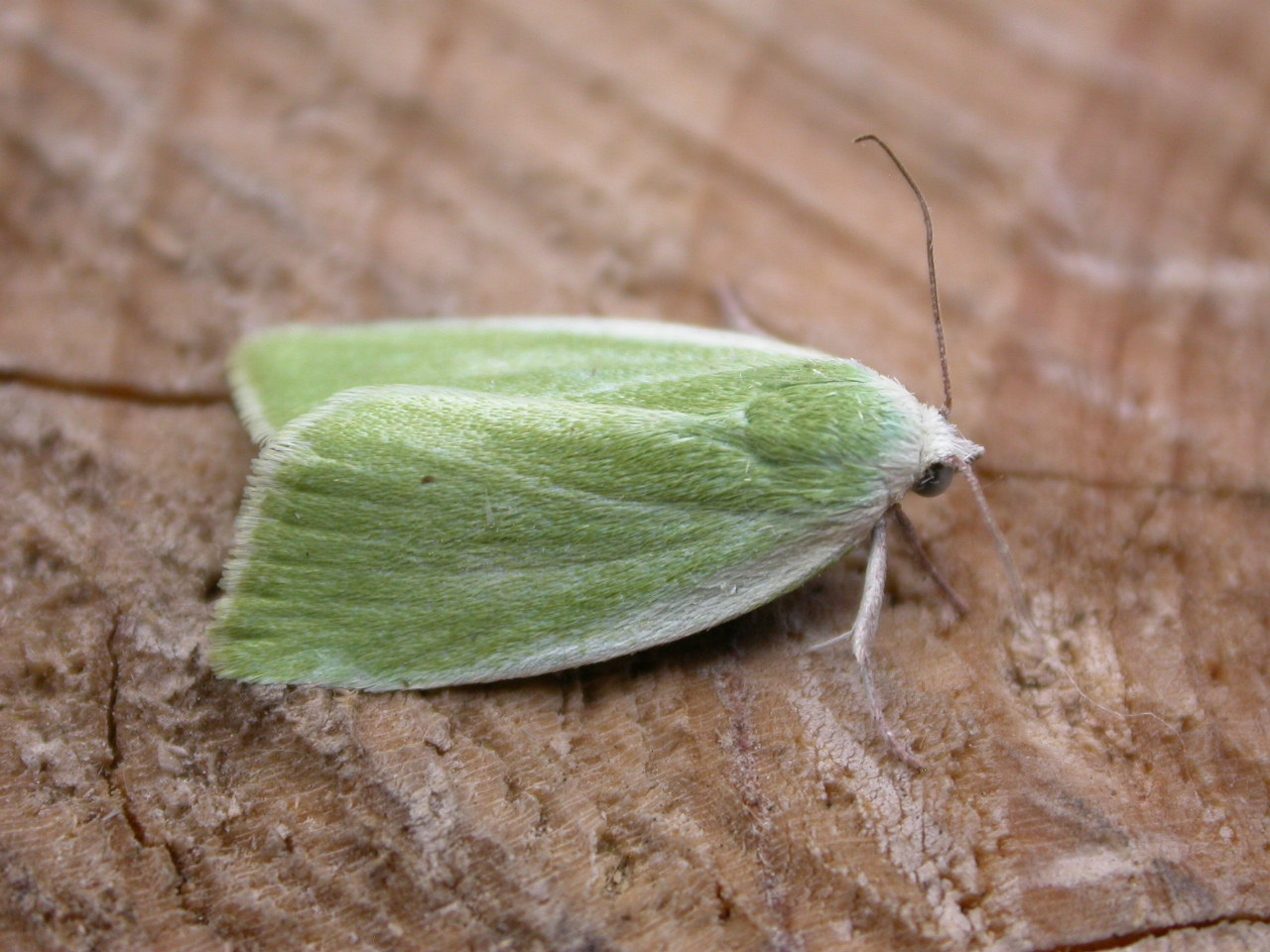

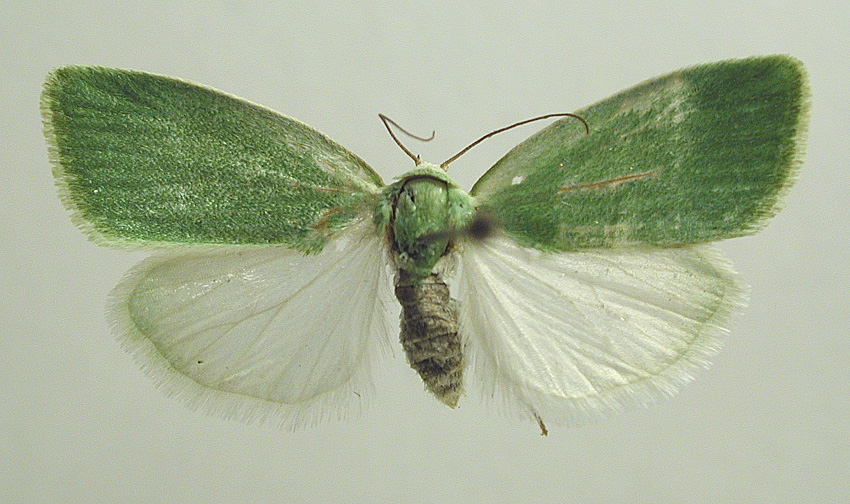

Scientific classification
- Kingdom: Animalia
- Phylum: Arthropoda
- Class: Insecta
- Order: Lepidoptera
- Superfamily: Noctuoidea
- Family: Nolidae
- Genus: Earias
- Species: E. clorana

Binomial name
- Earias clorana (Linnaeus, 1758)

Synonyms
- Phalaena clorana

= Earias clorana =

Species of moth

Earias clorana, the cream-bordered green pea, is a moth of the family Nolidae. It is found in most of Europe eastwards across the Palearctic to the Urals and Western Siberia.

== Technical description and variation ==
Earis chlorana L. (= viride Retz.) Forewing pale green; the costa white to beyond middle, the edge towards base brownish; hindwing white; the termen and fringe faintly greenish above vein 2; in the ab. flavimargo de Joan., from Brittany, the fringe is yellowish at base, brown in the middle, and white at the tips; ab. hemixantha de Joan, has the terminal area, except at costa, suffused with orange yellow. Larva whitish mottled with grey; the lines rusty grey, darker in places; pairs of somewhat pointed tubercles on segments 3, 4, 6, and 12; head pale green with black marks. The wingspan is 16–20 mm.

== Biology ==
The moth flies from May to August depending on the location.

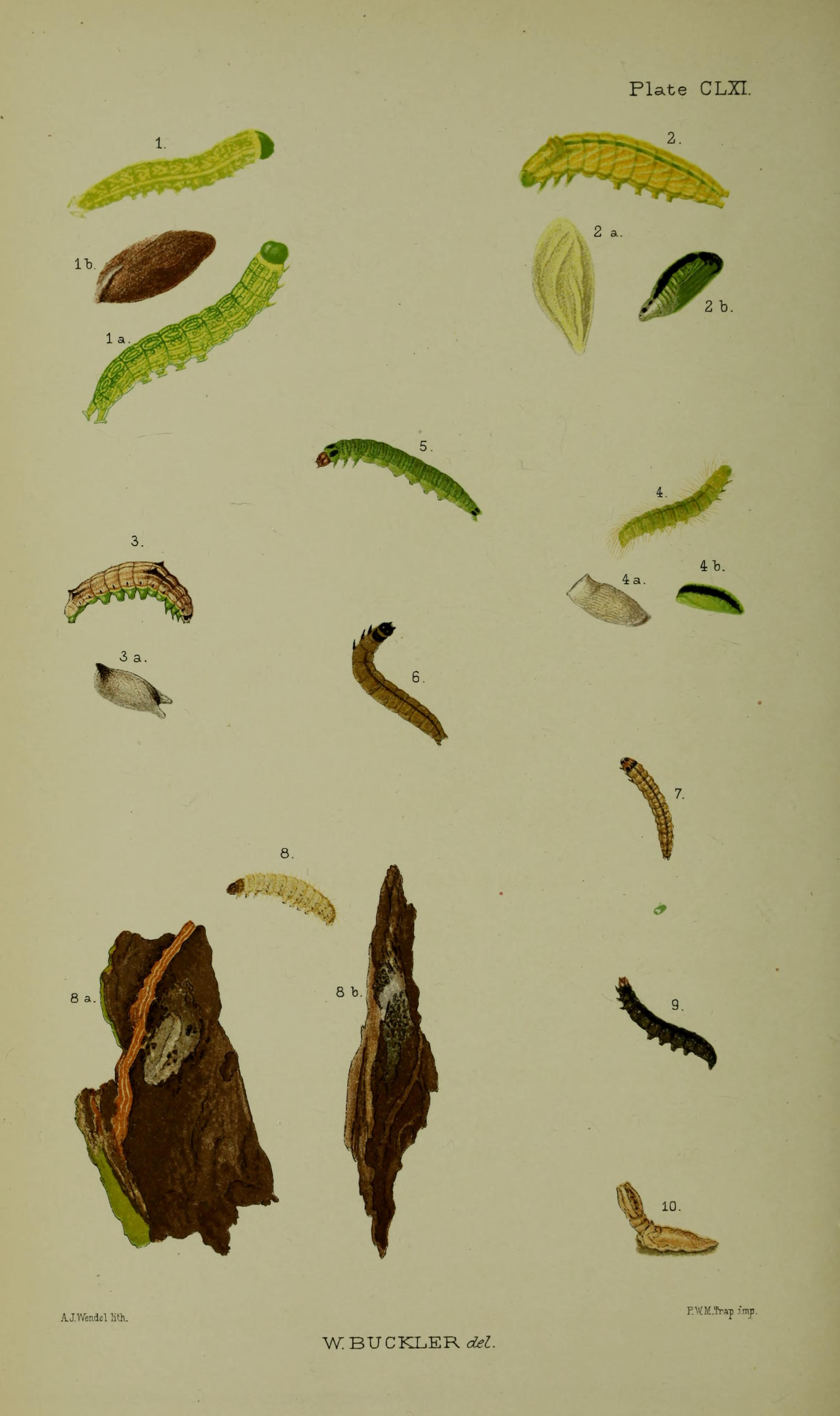
Figs. 3 larva after final moult 3a cocoon

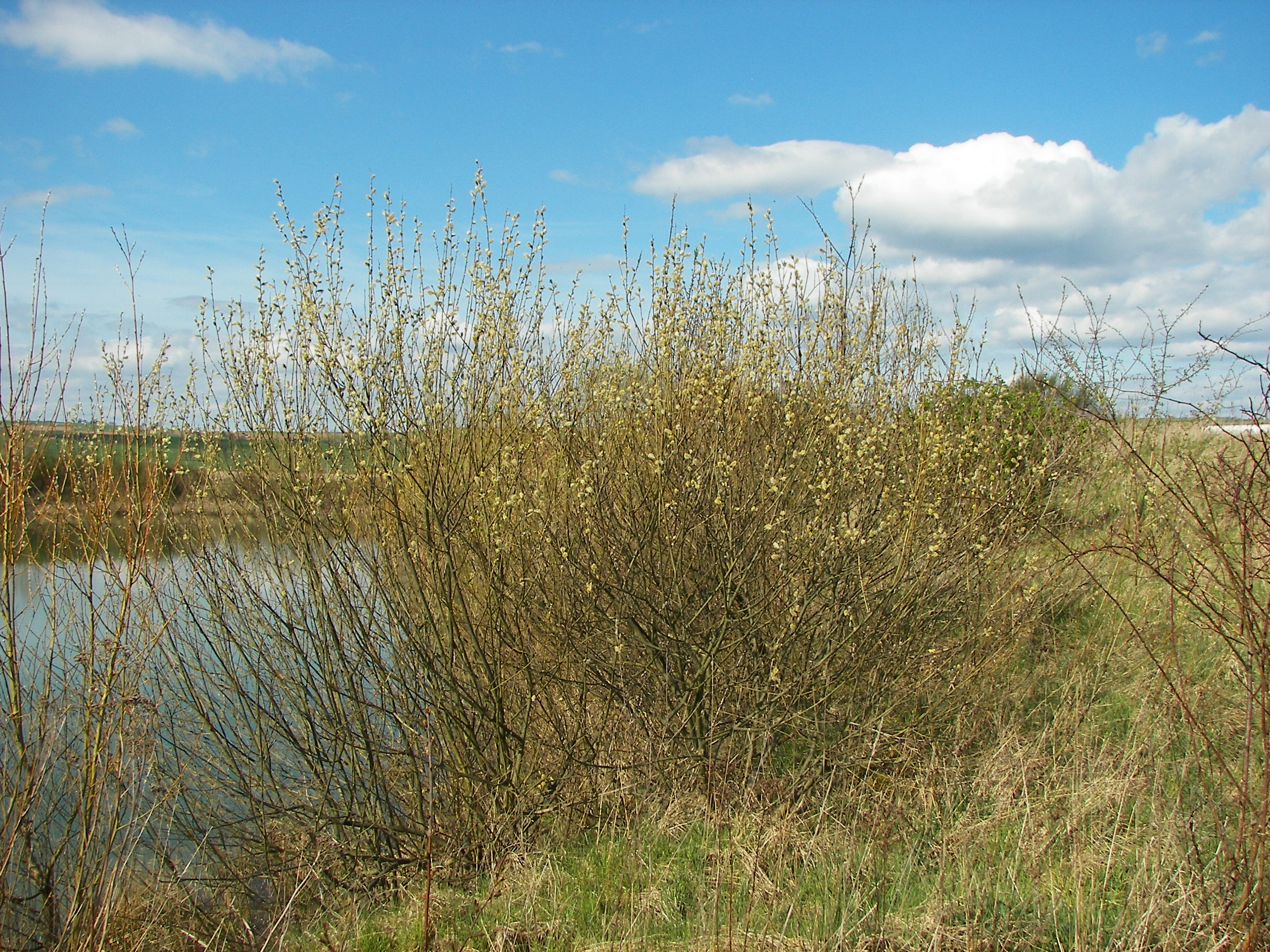
Habitat, Germany

The larvae feed on various willow species – Salix (British Isles, Finland, Europe), Salix aurita (Finland), Salix caprea (Finland), Salix cinerea (Finland), Salix lapponum (Finland), Salix purpurea (Finland), Salix repens (British Isles), Salix viminalis (British Isles) polyphagous (Sweden, Europe) spinning together the topmost leaves of the shoots and pupating in a boat shaped cocoon.
