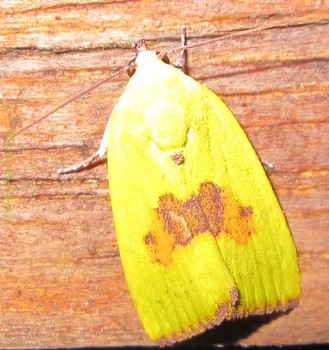

Scientific classification
- Kingdom: Animalia
- Phylum: Arthropoda
- Class: Insecta
- Order: Lepidoptera
- Superfamily: Noctuoidea
- Family: Nolidae
- Subfamily: Eariadinae
- Genus: Earias
- Species: E. biplaga

Binomial name
- Earias biplaga Walker, 1866

Synonyms
- Earias citrina Saalmüller, 1884; Earias crocea Mabille, 1900; Earias fuscoliliana Snellen, 1872; Earias maculana Snellen, 1872; Earias plaga Felder & Rogenhofer, 1874

= Earias biplaga =

Species of moth

Earias biplaga, the spiny bollworm, is a moth in the family Nolidae. The species was first described by Francis Walker in 1866. It is found throughout subtropical Africa including Atlantic and Indian Ocean islands.

Their length is about 10–12 mm, wingspan about 18–25 mm and it is characterised by a dark purplish-brown terminal fringe on the forewing.

The larvae feed on species of Fabaceae and Malvaceae. It is considered as a pest to cotton and cacao.
