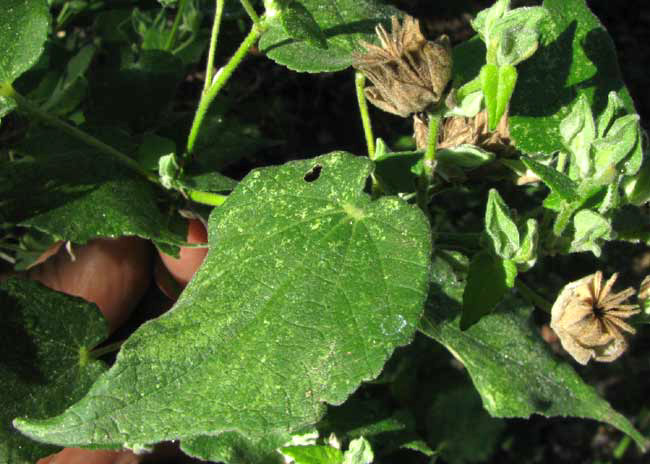
- Abutilon permolle leafy stem with mature schizocarps

Scientific classification
- Kingdom: Plantae
- Clade: Embryophytes
- Clade: Tracheophytes
- Clade: Angiosperms
- Clade: Eudicots
- Clade: Rosids
- Order: Malvales
- Family: Malvaceae
- Genus: Abutilon
- Species: A. permolle

Binomial name
- Abutilon permolle (Willd.) Sweet

Synonyms
- Sida permollis Willd.; Abutilon confertiflorum A.Rich.; Abutilon peraffine Shuttlew. ex Chapm.; Sida confertiflora (A.Rich.) D.Dietr.

= Abutilon permolle =

Species of plant

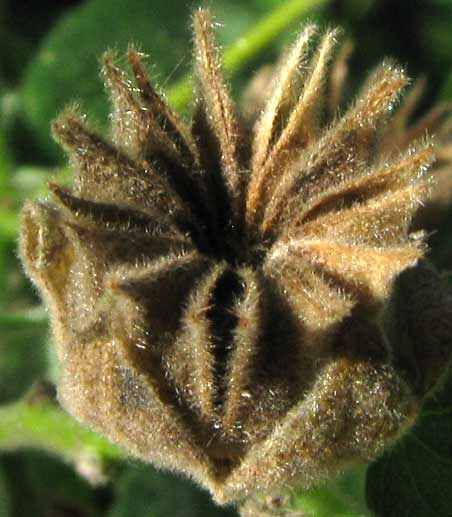
Mature schizocarp with splitting mericarps

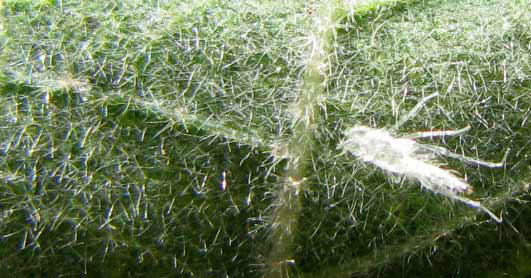
Velvety lower surface of leaf with branched hairs

Abutilon permolle, the coastal Indian mallow, also known as velvety abutilon and other names, is a species of shrub native to Central America, the Greater Antilles, and southern Florida in the USA. It belongs to the family Malvaceae.

== Description ==
Abutilon permolle belongs to a large genus in a large family, so numerous species look somewhat similar. Besides its presence in a fairly limited geographical area mostly in the North American tropics, here are key features for recognizing the species:

- It is a shrub growing up to 2 m (6 ft 7 in) tall.
- Leaves with petioles up to 9 cm (3 1/2 in) long have generally heart-shaped, hairy blades up to 13.5 cm (5 1/2 in) long and sometimes almost as wide, with blade tips gradually diminishing to a point. Bases are 2-lobed and blade margins bear short teeth. Blade upper surfaces are a little rough-hairy, while the lower surfaces are soft and velvety to the touch; many hairs are branched, or "stellate." Blade upper surfaces are darker green than lower ones.
- Flowers occur singly or a few along stems, each on a pedicel up to 3 cm (1 1/8 in) long, becoming longer in fruit. Green, hairy calyces with lobes up to 1.2 cm (1/2 in) lie below 5 yellow to orangish-yellow petals up to 1.9 cm (3/4 in) long and a little less wide. Rising above the stamens, styles are 8-11 branched, the branches up to 4 mm (3/16 in) long.
- Schizocarp-type fruits up to 1.5 cm (9/16 in) in diameter divide into 8-11 hairy sections, or "mericarps," each mericarp producing 3 seeds. Mericarp tops narrow to sharp points.

== Distribution ==
In the USA, Abutilon permolle occurs only in southern Florida. In southeastern Mexico it is found in the Yucatan Peninsula and the southernmost state of Chiapas. In Central America it is documented in Belize, Guatemala and Honduras. In the Caribbean area it is found in the Greater Antilles, the Turks and Caicos Islands and The Bahamas.

== Habitat ==
In southern Florida, Abutilon permolle occurs in disturbed uplands and Rockland hammocks. In Cuba it is found in dry scrub mainly along the coasts, in spiny dry scrub on serpentine, and as a ruderal species at elevations near sea level. In Mexico's Yucatan Peninsula it appears in forests with deciduous and semi-deciduous leaves, including those with columnar cacti, also in scrub among coastal dunes and in disturbed, weedy areas such as roadsides, agriculatural fields, etc.

== Ecology ==
Caterpillars of the mallow scrub-hairstreak, Strymon istapa, feed on Abutilon permolle.

== Uses by humans ==
=== In traditional medicine ===
In Mexico's Yucatan Peninsula, Abutilon permolle is used by the Mayan people to treat oral candidiasis, or "thrush," among children; without preparation, the plant's leaves are spread directly atop the tongue.

=== As a source of fiber ===
In Guatemala's Petén Department the Mayan people have obtained a strong fiber from the stems Abutilon permolle.

== Taxonomy ==
In 1809 when Carl Ludwig Willdenow formally described Abutilon permolle under the basionym Sida permollis, he did not know the native land of the species; his type specimen was a plant cultivated in the Berlin botanical garden, as indicated in his remarks.

=== Etymology ===
The genus name Abutilon is New Latin probably derived from the Arabic abu, meaning "father of," and Persian tula or tulha, meaning "mallow."

The species name permolle is based on the Latin permollis, meaning "very soft," certainly in reference to the leaves' velvety touch.
