= Earias vittella =

Scientific classification
- Kingdom: Animalia
- Phylum: Arthropoda
- Clade: Pancrustacea
- Class: Insecta
- Order: Lepidoptera
- Superfamily: Noctuoidea
- Family: Nolidae
- Genus: Earias
- Species: E. vittella

Binomial name
- Earias vittella Fabricius, 1794

Synonyms
- Earias fabia (Cramer, 1781); Earias huegeli Rogenhofer, 1870; Earias vitella Sherborn, 1902

Species of moth

Earias vittella, an Asian "spotted bollworm", is a moth species in the family Nolidae. The species was first described by Johan Christian Fabricius in 1794. Most records are from Asia, Australia and certain Pacific islands, including Fiji, Thailand, Saudi Arabia, Sri Lanka, East Africa, Pakistan, Bangladesh, Myanmar, Indonesia and New Guinea.
