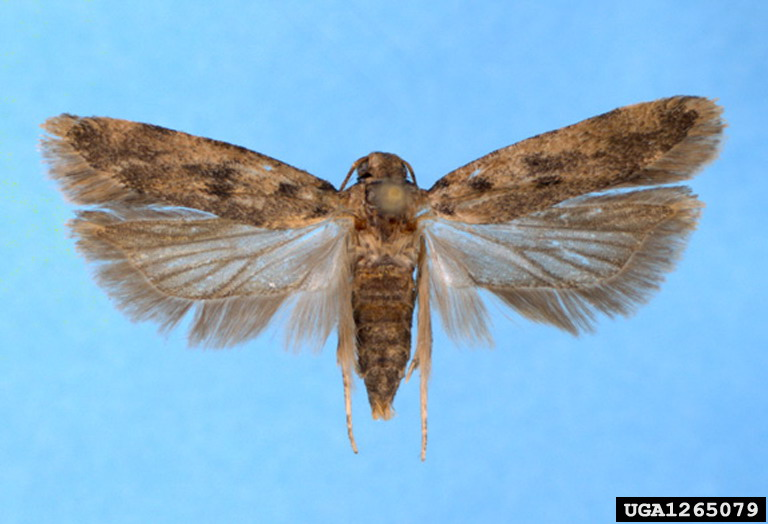

Scientific classification
- Kingdom: Animalia
- Phylum: Arthropoda
- Clade: Pancrustacea
- Class: Insecta
- Order: Lepidoptera
- Family: Gelechiidae
- Genus: Pectinophora
- Species: P. gossypiella

Binomial name
- Pectinophora gossypiella (Saunders, 1844)

Synonyms
- Depressaria gossypiella Saunders, 1844; Gelechia gossypiella; Platyedra gossypiella; Gelechia umbripennis Walsingham, 1885

= Pink bollworm =

Species of moth

The pink bollworm (Pectinophora gossypiella; Spanish: lagarta rosada) is an insect known for being a pest in cotton farming. The adult is a small, thin, gray moth with fringed wings. The larva is a dull white caterpillar with eight pairs of legs with conspicuous pink banding along its dorsum. The larva reaches one half inch in length.

The female moth lays eggs in a cotton boll, and when the larvae emerge from the eggs, they inflict damage through feeding. They chew through the cotton lint to feed on the seeds. Since cotton is used for both fiber and seed oil, the damage is twofold. Their disruption of the protective tissue around the boll is a portal of entry for other insects and fungi.

The pink bollworm is native to Asia, but has become an invasive species in most of the world's cotton-growing regions. It reached the cotton belt in the southern United States by the 1920s. It was a major pest in the cotton fields of the southern California deserts. The USDA announced in 2018 that it had been eradicated from the continental United States, through the synergistic combination of using transgenic Bt cotton and releasing sterile males.

In parts of India, the pink bollworm is now resistant to first generation transgenic Bt cotton (Bollgard cotton) that expresses a single Bt gene (Cry1Ac). Monsanto has admitted that this variety is ineffective against the pink bollworm pest in parts of Gujarat, India. Infestation on susceptible cotton is generally controlled with insecticides. Once a crop has been harvested, the field is plowed under as soon as possible to stop the life cycle of the new generation of pink bollworm. Unharvested bolls harbor the larvae, so these are destroyed. The plants are plowed into the earth and the fields are irrigated liberally to drown out remaining pests. Some farmers burn the stubble after harvest. Surviving bollworms will overwinter in the field and re-infest the following season. Populations of bollworms are also controlled with mating disruption, chemicals, and releases of sterile males which mate with the females but fail to fertilize their eggs.

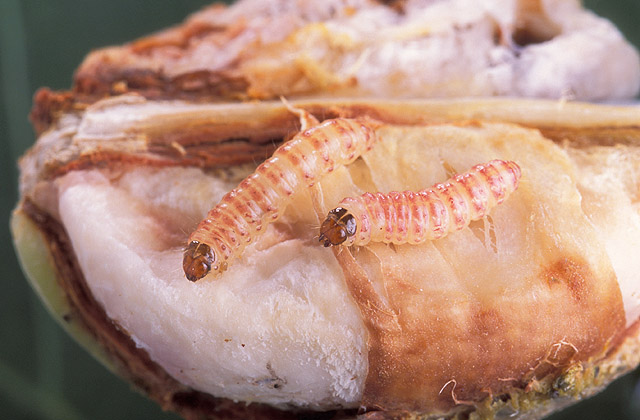
Caterpillar

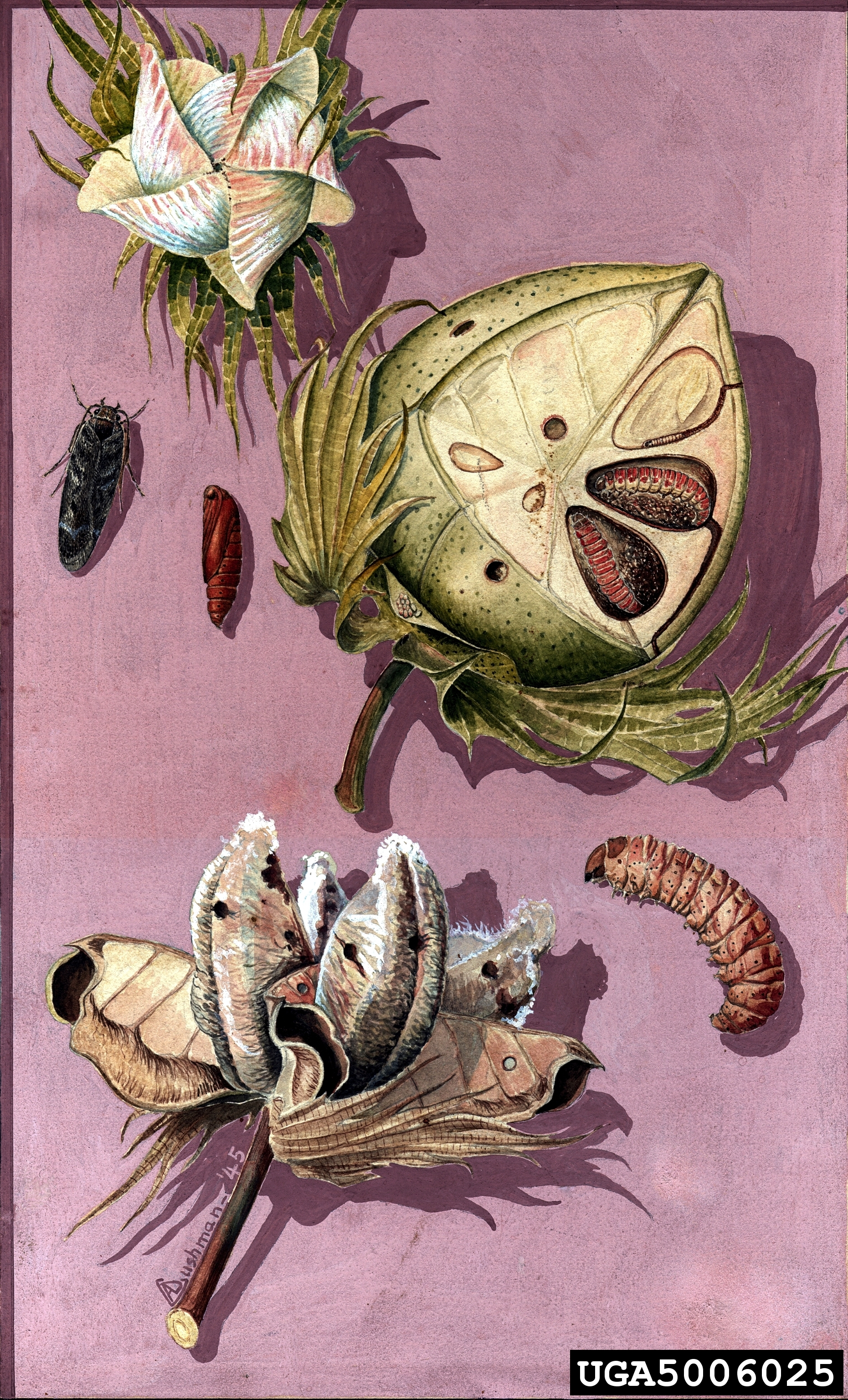
Illustrated Life Cycle

== General reference ==
- New Standard Encyclopedia, © 1990 Chicago, Illinois
