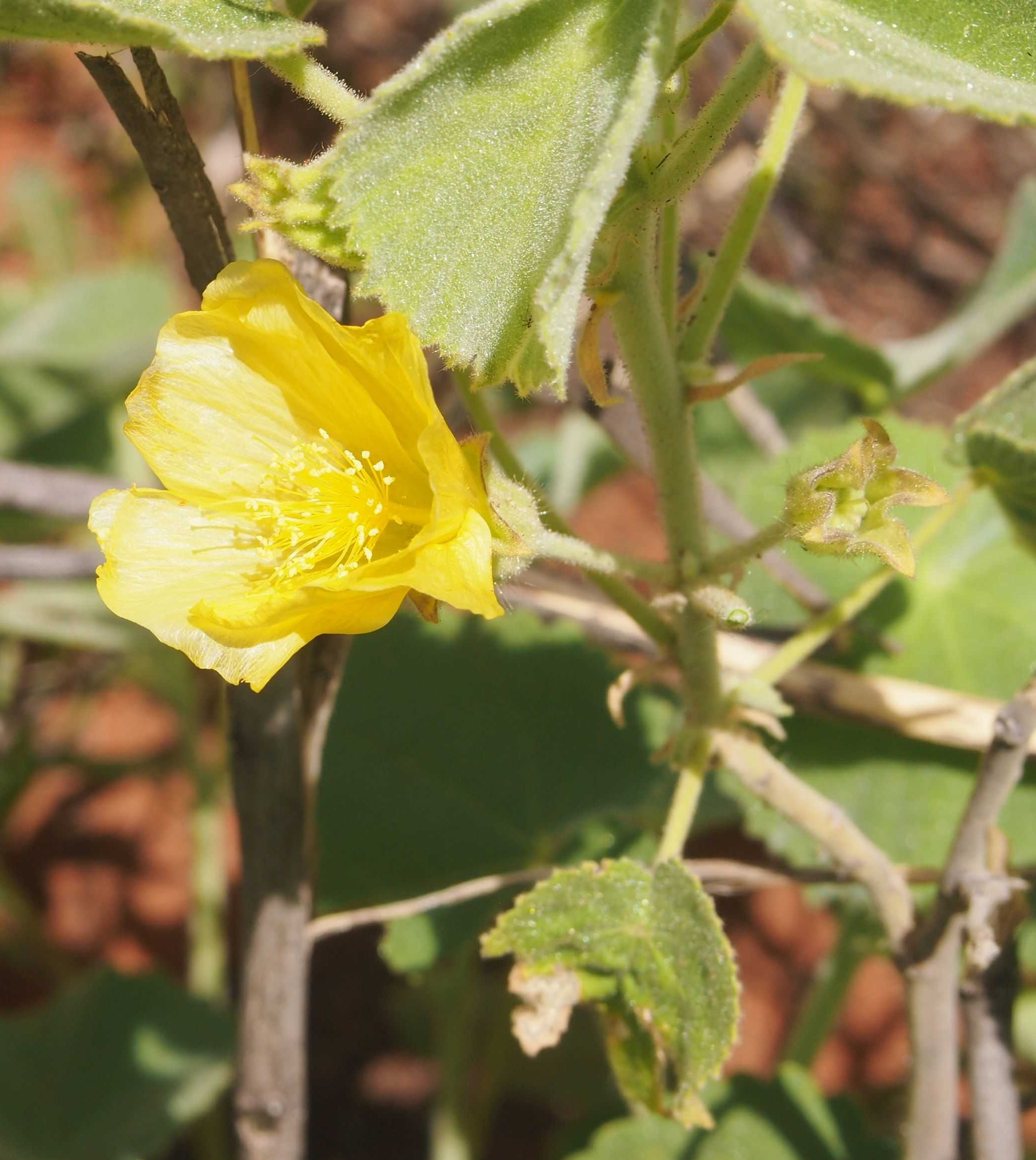
- Abutilon otocarpum flower

Scientific classification
- Kingdom: Plantae
- Clade: Tracheophytes
- Clade: Angiosperms
- Clade: Eudicots
- Clade: Rosids
- Order: Malvales
- Family: Malvaceae
- Genus: Abutilon
- Species: A. otocarpum

Binomial name
- Abutilon otocarpum F.Muell.

= Abutilon otocarpum =

Species of flowering plant

Abutilon otocarpum, the desert lantern, is a small shrub of the family Malvaceae found in most parts of Australia.

== Description ==
This shrub can grow to 60 cm tall, with flat leaves that alternate up its stem. Leaves of the desert lantern can grow to 1.5 – 6 cm long and are narrow to circular, hairy and toothed. The flowers are yellow, with 5 petals, borne singly on stalks originating at the bases of the leaves, often appearing clustered at the ends of the stems.

The desert lantern differs from dwarf lantern flower (Abutilon fraseri) and plains lantern-bush (Abutilon halophilum) in that the petals are about the same length as the calyx, and from velvetleaf (Abutilon theophrasti) in that the tops of the fruitlets in the fruiting body have very short points.

== Cultivation and uses ==
Abutilon otocarpum grows wild in a range of climates from warm temperate to the tropical zone, and is found particularly in semi-arid areas of the tropics and subtropics. Plants in this genus generally require a position in full sun or part day shade, and a fertile well-drained soil. The desert lantern can be in flower for much of the year.

A fibre was obtained from the stem bark by Aboriginal peoples, including the Kalkatungu, but it is unknown if the plant is still utilized today.

== Habitat ==
Abutilon otocarpum is found in semi-arid districts; on red sandy soils, sand rises and dunes. It occurs on sandplains and low sandy rises, dunefields, fertile alluvial plains, Mulga-dominated red earth plains, intermittent watercourses and run-on areas, and rocky or gravelly ranges, hills or rises composed of neutral or acidic rocks.

== Aboriginal language names ==
- Alyawarr: akeley-akeley, anteyterrk, arlpart, aylpart
- Anmatyerr: akeley-akeley
- Pintupi Luritja: tatji-tatji
- Pitjantjatjara: tjirin-tjirinpa
- Warlpiri: jinka-jinka, taji-taji

== Ethnobotany ==
Abutilon otocarpum is a food and water source for the Alyawarr, and a source of firewood and material for toys and spears for the Anmatyerr. Its fruit is a source of food for the Pintupi Luritja and the Pitjantjatjara, and is used in fish-poisons and traps by the Pitjantjatjara and the Warlpiri.
