= Pectinophora scutigera =

Scientific classification
- Domain: Eukaryota
- Kingdom: Animalia
- Phylum: Arthropoda
- Class: Insecta
- Order: Lepidoptera
- Family: Gelechiidae
- Genus: Pectinophora
- Species: P. scutigera

Binomial name
- Pectinophora scutigera (Holdaway, 1926)

Synonyms
- Platyedra scutigera Holdaway, 1926

Species of moth

Pectinophora scutigera, the Queensland pink bollworm or pinkspotted bollworm, is a moth of the family Gelechiidae. It was described by Holdaway in 1926 from Australia, where it occurs in coastal and central Queensland. It has also been recorded from Hawaii, New Guinea, Micronesia and New Caledonia.
