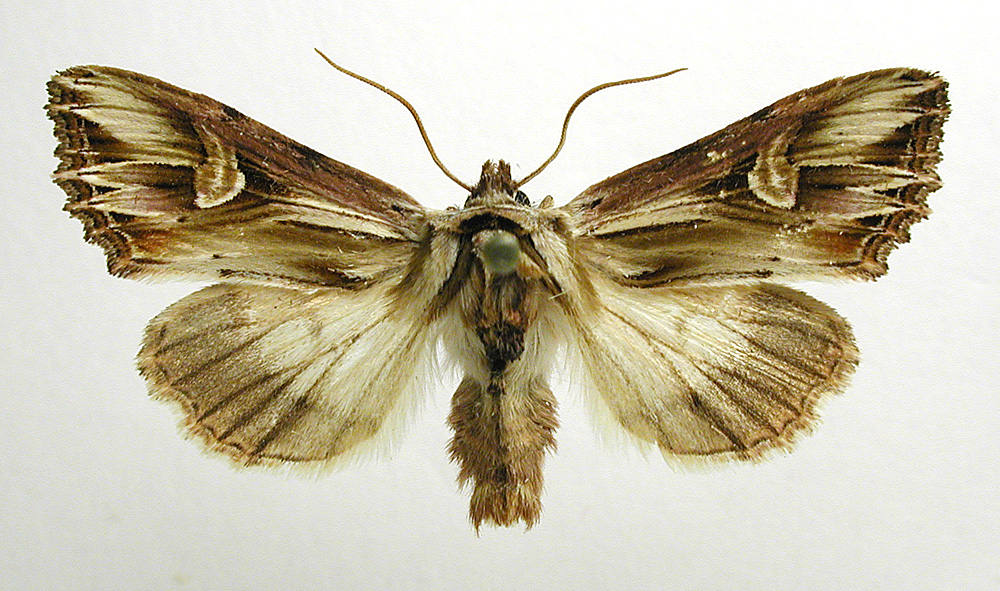
- Actinotia polyodon

Scientific classification
- Kingdom: Animalia
- Phylum: Arthropoda
- Class: Insecta
- Order: Lepidoptera
- Superfamily: Noctuoidea
- Family: Noctuidae
- Subfamily: Hadeninae; Guenée, 1837

= Hadeninae =

Former subfamily of moths

Hadeninae was formerly a subfamily of the moth family Noctuidae, but was merged into the subfamily Noctuinae. The tribes Apameini, Caradrinini, Elaphriini, Episemini, Eriopygini, Hadenini, Leucaniini, Orthosiini, and Xylenini were moved from Hadeninae to Noctuinae.
