= Malva maritima =

Malva maritima can refer to:

- Malva maritima (Gouan) Pau, a synonym of Malva subovata (DC.) Molero & J.M.Monts.
- Malva maritima Lam., a synonym of Malva tournefortiana L.
- Malva maritima Salisb., a synonym of Althaea officinalis L.
