= Annual mallow =

Annual mallow is a common name for several plants and may refer to:

- Malva trimestris
- Malope trifida

== See also ==
- Annual tree-mallow, Malva punctata
