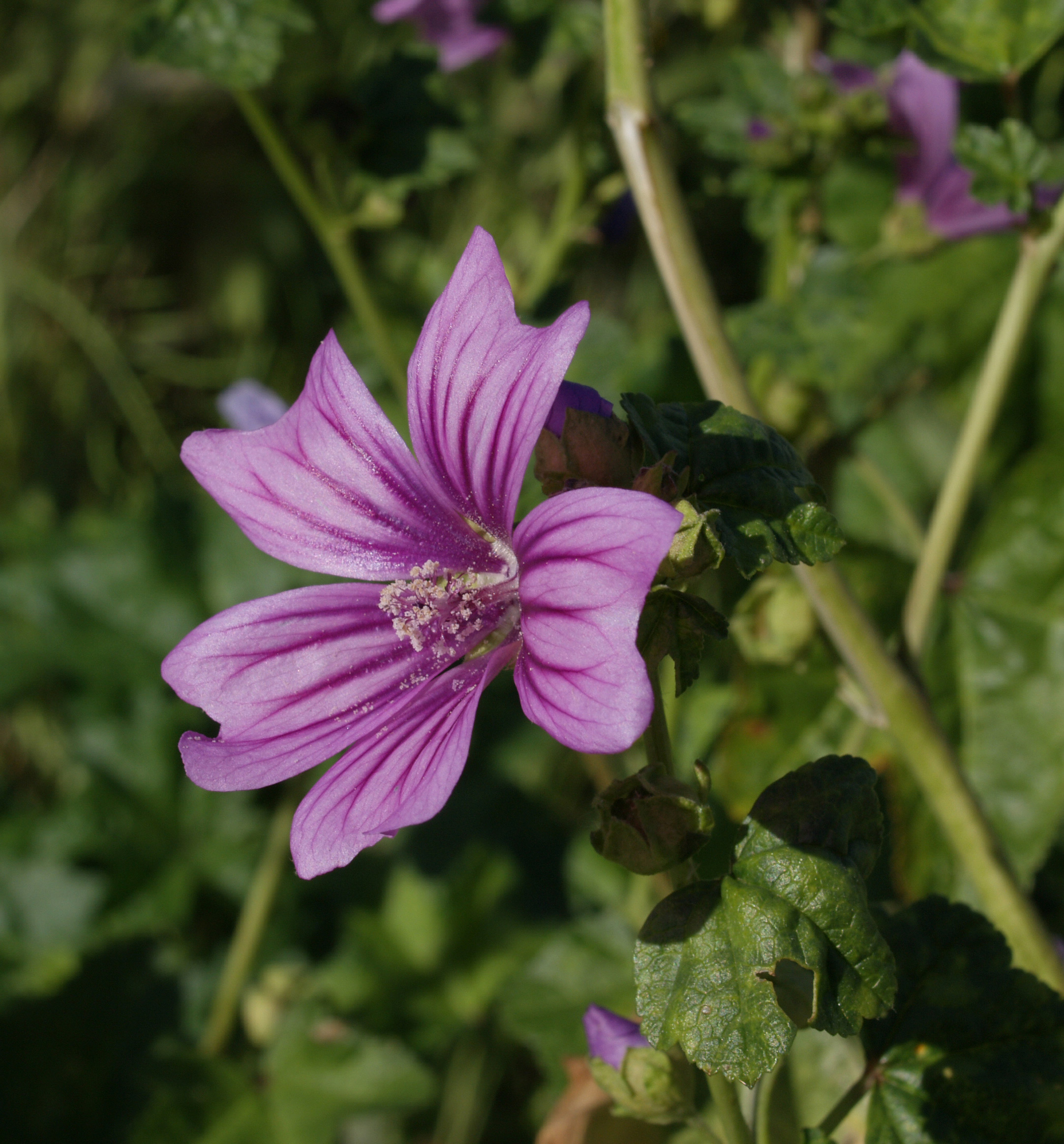
- Malva sylvestris

Scientific classification
- Kingdom: Plantae
- Clade: Tracheophytes
- Clade: Angiosperms
- Clade: Eudicots
- Clade: Rosids
- Order: Malvales
- Family: Malvaceae
- Subfamily: Malvoideae
- Tribe: Malveae
- Genus: Malva; L.

Type species
- Malva sylvestris

Species
- See text

Synonyms
- Anthema Medik.; Axolopha Alef.; Bismalva Medik.; Dinacrusa G.Krebs; Lavatera L.; Navaea Webb & Berthel.; Olbia Medik.; Saviniona Webb & Berthel.; Stegia DC.

= Malva =

Genus of flowering plants

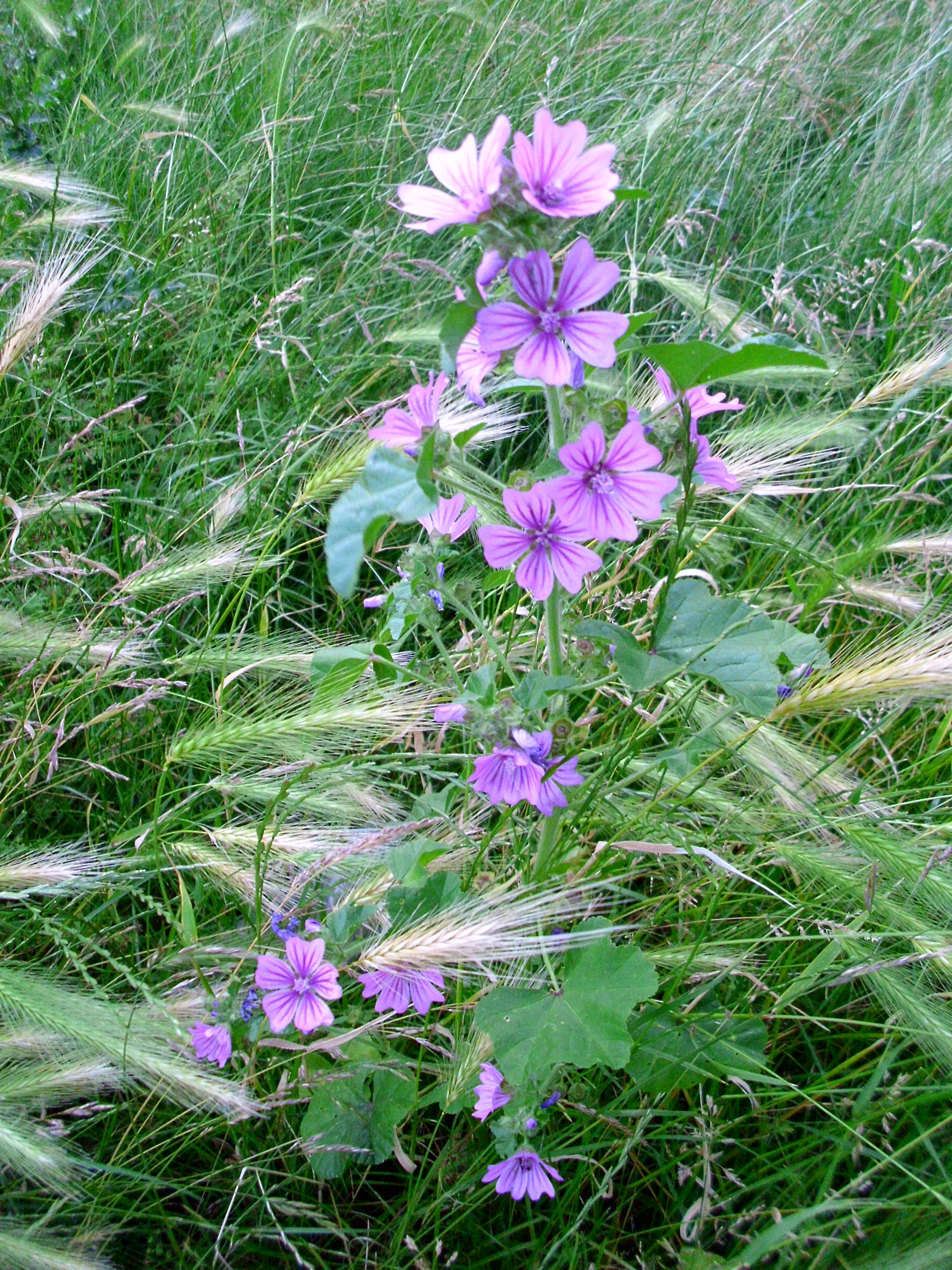
Malva sylvestris

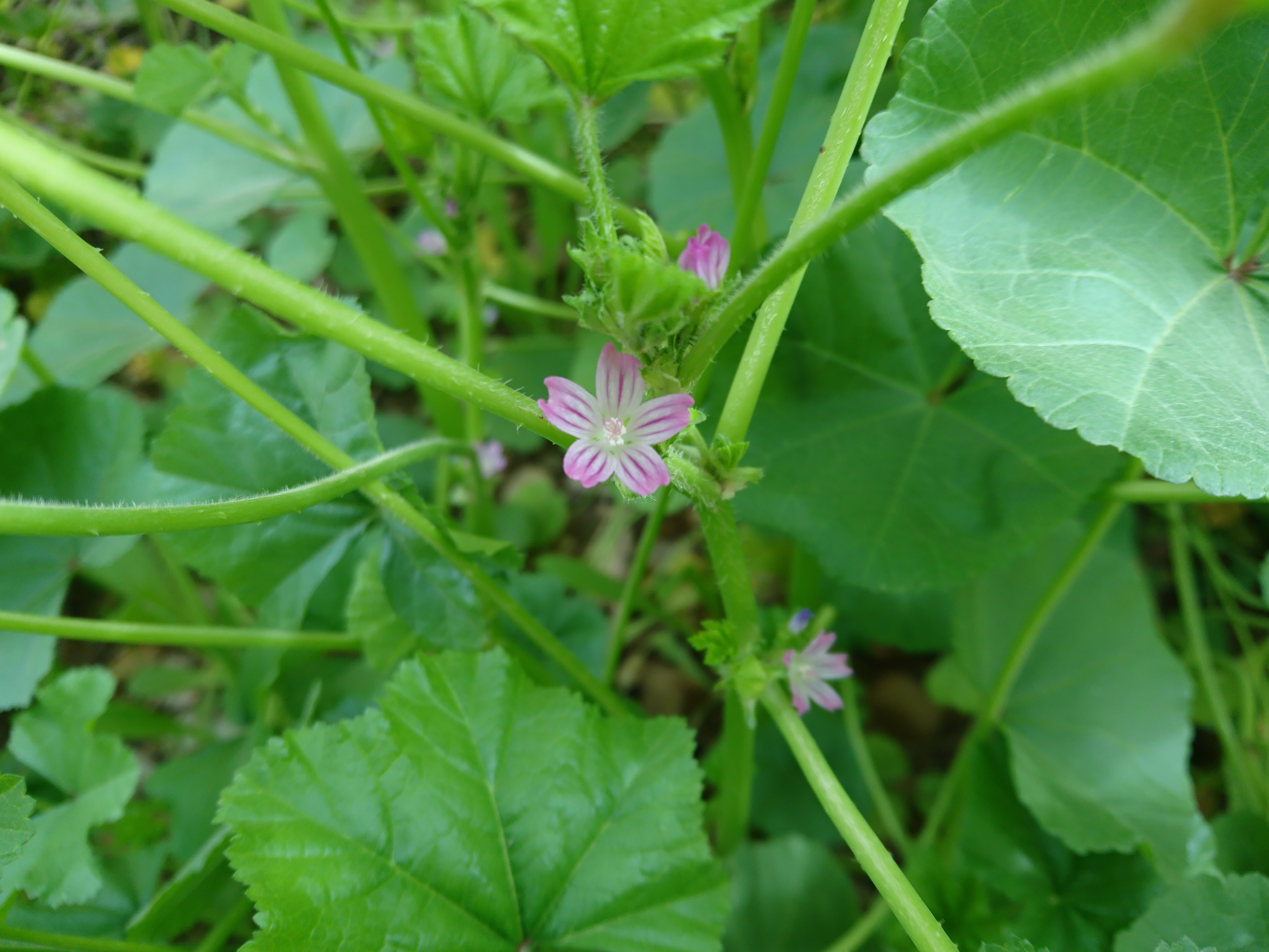
Cheeseweed, Behbahan, Iran

Malva is a genus of herbaceous or woody, annual, biennial, and perennial plants in the family Malvaceae. It is one of several closely related genera in the family to bear the common English name mallow. The genus is widespread throughout the temperate, subtropical and tropical regions of Africa, Asia and Europe.

The leaves are alternate, palmately lobed. The flowers are from 0.5–5 cm diameter, with five pink, lilac, purple or white petals.

== Etymology ==
The word "mallow" is derived from Old English "mealwe", which was imported from Latin "malva", cognate with Ancient Greek μαλάχη (malakhē) meaning "mallow", both perhaps reflecting a Mediterranean term. The Italian linguist Vincenzo Cocco proposed an etymological link to Georgian malokhi, comparing also Hebrew מַלּוּחַ (malúakh) meaning "salty".

In 1859, the colour mauve was named after the French name for this plant.

== Uses ==
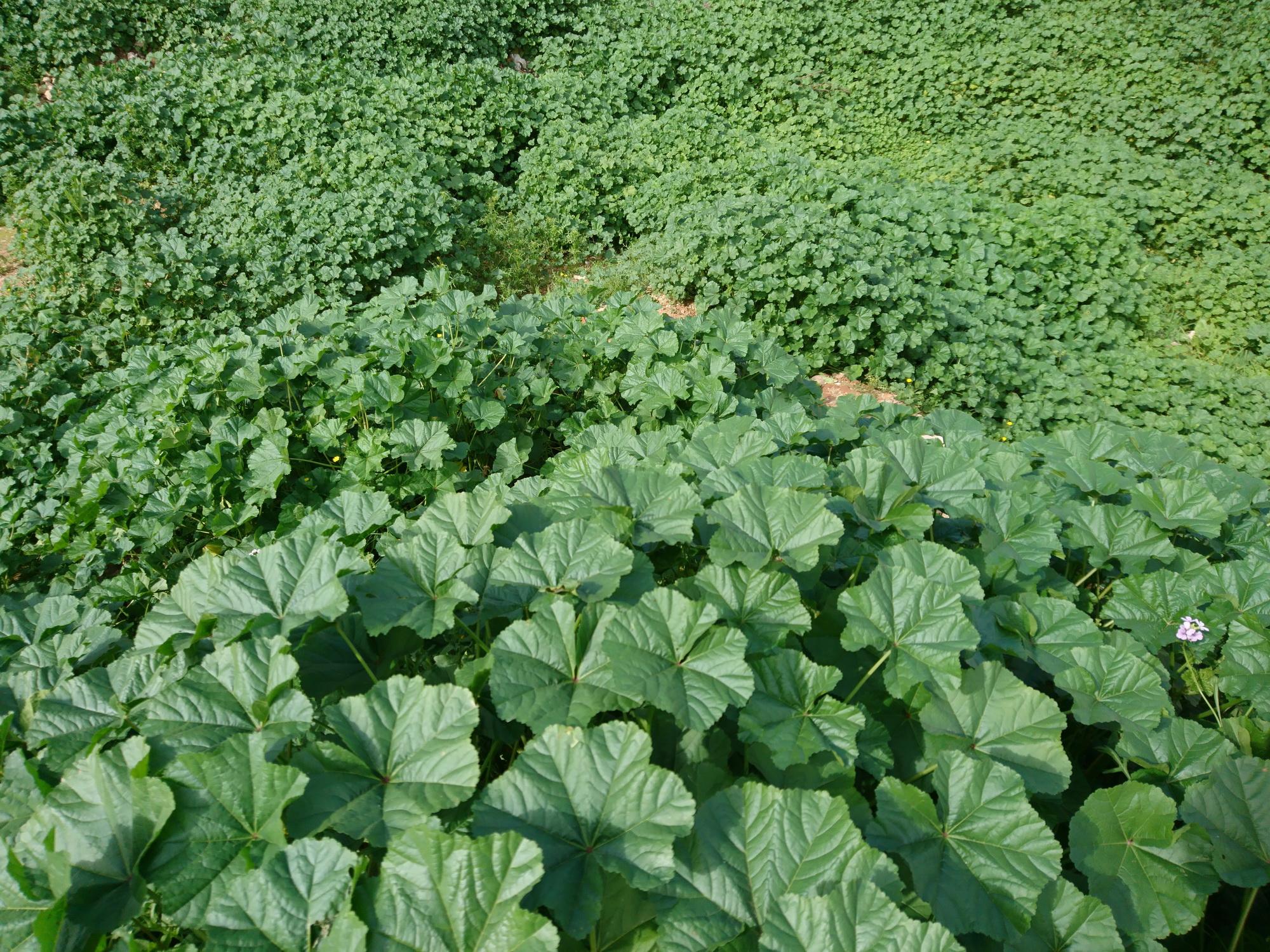
Wild Cheeseweed Field, Behbahan

=== Ornamental plant ===
Very easily grown, short-lived perennials are often grown as ornamental plants.

=== Food ===
Many species are edible as leaf vegetables and commonly foraged. Known as ebegümeci in Turkish, the leaves are used as a vegetable in Turkey in various forms such as stuffing the leaves with bulgur or rice or using the boiled leaves with seasoning as side dish. Malva verticillata (Chinese: 冬寒菜; pinyin: dōngháncài, Korean: 아욱 auk) is grown on a limited commercial scale in China; when made as a herbal infusion, it is used for its colon cleansing properties and as a weight loss supplement.

In the Levant, Malva nicaeensis leaves and fruit are used as food (e.g., khubeza patties, stuffed mallow, or as a stew), it is especially popular in areas with scarce food such as the Gaza Strip.

In Tunisia, mallow is traditionally consumed in a variety of dishes, typically with couscous.

Mild tasting, young mallow leaves can be a substitute for lettuce, whereas older leaves are better cooked as a leafy green vegetable. The buds and flowers can be used in salads. Small fruits that grow on the plants can also be eaten raw.

Bodos of Northeast India cultivate a subspecies of Malva called lapha and use it extensively in their traditional cuisine, although its use is not much known among other people of India except in the northern Indian state of Kashmir where Malva leaves are a highly cherished vegetable dish called "Soachal".

=== Medical use ===
In Catalonia (Spain) they use the leaves to cure the sting or paresthesia of the stinging nettle (Urtica dioica).

Leaves of various species Malva have been used in traditional Austrian medicine internally as tea or externally as baths for treatment of disorders of the skin, gastrointestinal tract and respiratory tract. The leaves can also be chewed to soothe coughs or sore throats.

== Cultivation ==
Cultivation is by sowing the seeds directly outdoors in early spring. The seed is easy to collect, and they will often spread themselves by seed.

Some Malva species are invasive weeds, particularly in the Americas where, excluding those species native to Baja California and California, most were introduced.

== History ==
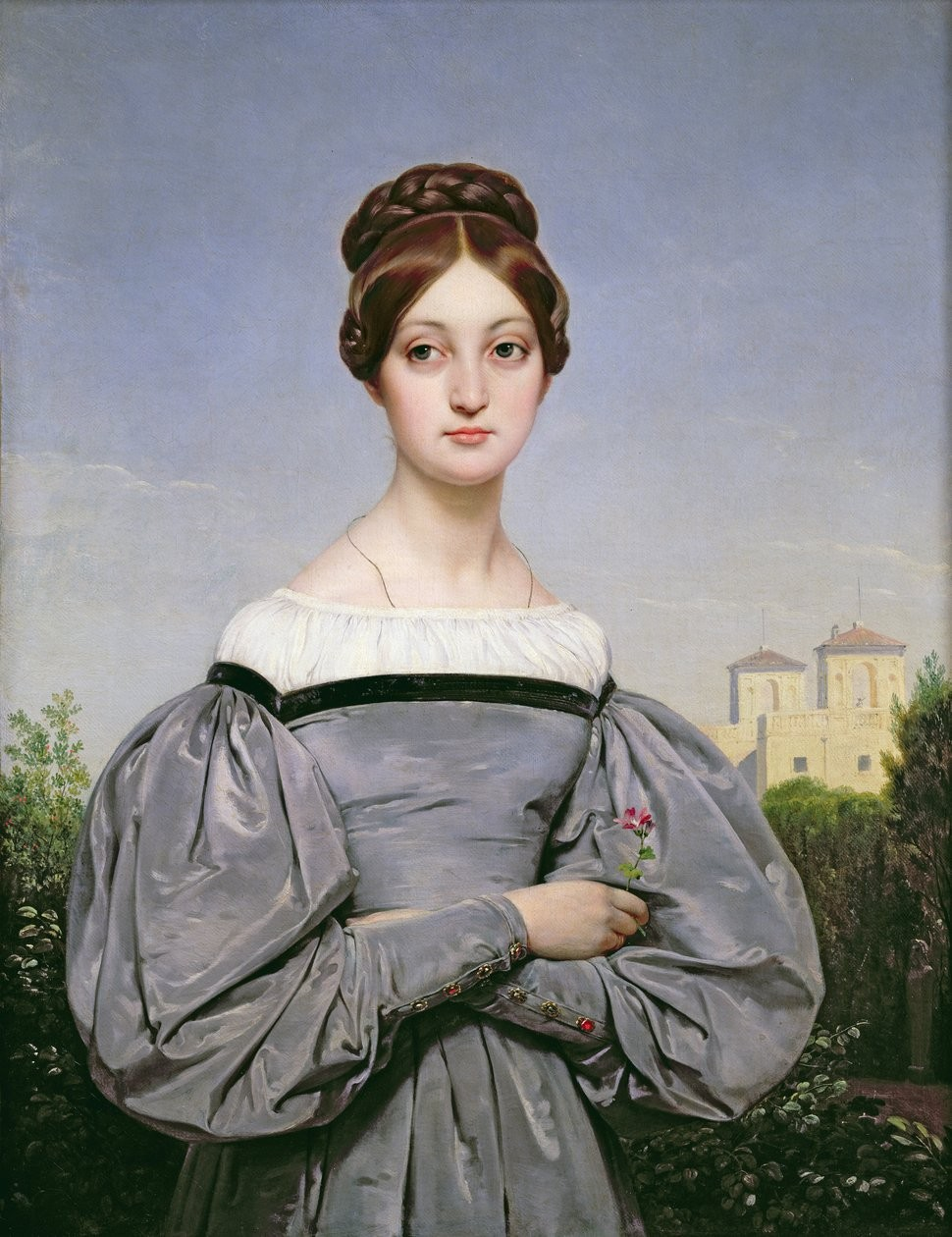
Portrait of Louise Vernet by Horace Vernet, 1830. She is shown clutching a mallow

The third century BC physician Diphilus of Siphnus wrote that "[mallow] juice lubricates the windpipe, nourishes, and is easily digested." Horace mentions it in reference to his own diet, which he describes as very simple: "Me pascunt olivae, / me cichorea levesque malvae" ("As for me, olives, endives, and mallows provide sustenance"). Lord Monboddo describes his translation of an ancient epigram that demonstrates Malva was planted upon the graves of the ancients, stemming from the belief that the dead could feed on such perfect plants.

== Species ==
The following 61 species are accepted:

- Malva acerifolia (Cav.) Alef.
- Malva × adulterina Wallr.
- Malva aegyptia L.
- Malva aethiopica C.J.S.Davis
- Malva agrigentina (Tineo) Soldano, Banfi & Galasso
- Malva alcea L. – greater musk-mallow, vervain mallow
- Malva arborea (L.) Webb & Berthel.
- Malva × arbosii Sennen
- Malva assurgentiflora (Kellogg) M.F.Ray – island mallow, mission mallow, royal mallow, island tree mallow
- Malva bucharica Iljin
- Malva cachemiriana (Cambess.) Alef.
- Malva cavanillesiana Raizada
- Malva × clementii (Cheek) Stace
- Malva × columbretensis (Juan & M.B.Crespo) Juan & M.B.Crespo
- Malva cretica Cav.
- Malva durieui Spach
- Malva × egarensis Cadevall
- Malva flava (Desf.) Alef.
- Malva hispanica L.
- Malva × inodora Ponert
- Malva × intermedia Boreau
- Malva leonardii I.Riedl
- Malva lindsayi (Moran) M.F.Ray
- Malva × litoralis Dethard. ex Rchb.
- Malva longiflora (Boiss. & Reut.) Soldano, Banfi & Galasso
- Malva ludwigii (L.) Soldano, Banfi & Galasso
- Malva lusitanica (L.) Valdés
- Malva maroccana (Batt. & Trab.) Verloove & Lambinon
- Malva microphylla (Baker f.) Molero & J.M.Monts.
- Malva moschata L. – musk-mallow
- Malva multiflora (Cav.) Soldano, Banfi & Galasso
- Malva neglecta Wallr. – dwarf mallow, buttonweed, cheeseplant, cheeseweed, common mallow, roundleaf mallow
- Malva nicaeensis All. – French mallow, bull mallow
- Malva oblongifolia (Boiss.) Soldano, Banfi & Galasso
- Malva occidentalis (S.Watson) M.F.Ray
- Malva olbia (L.) Alef.
- Malva oxyloba Boiss.
- Malva pacifica M.F.Ray
- Malva pamiroalaica Iljin
- Malva parviflora L. – least mallow, cheeseweed, cheeseweed mallow, small-whorl mallow
- Malva phoenicea (Vent.) Alef.
- Malva preissiana Miq. – Australian hollyhock
- Malva punctata (All.) Alef.
- Malva pusilla Sm. – small mallow
- Malva qaiseri Abedin
- Malva setigera K.F.Schimp. & Spenn.
- Malva stenopetala (Coss. & Durieu ex Batt.) Soldano, Banfi & Galasso
- Malva stipulacea Cav.
- Malva subovata (DC.) Molero & J.M.Monts.
- Malva sylvestris L. – common mallow, high mallow
- Malva × tetuanensis Pau
- Malva thuringiaca (L.) Vis.
- Malva tournefortiana L.
- Malva trimestris (L.) Salisb.
- Malva unguiculata (Desf.) Alef.
- Malva valdesii (Molero & J.M.Monts.) Soldano, Banfi & Galasso
- Malva verticillata L. – Chinese mallow, cluster mallow
- Malva vidalii (Pau) Molero & J.M.Monts.
- Malva waziristanensis Blatt.
- Malva weinmanniana (Besser ex Rchb.) Conran
- Malva xizangensis Y.S.Ye, L.Fu & D.X.Duan
