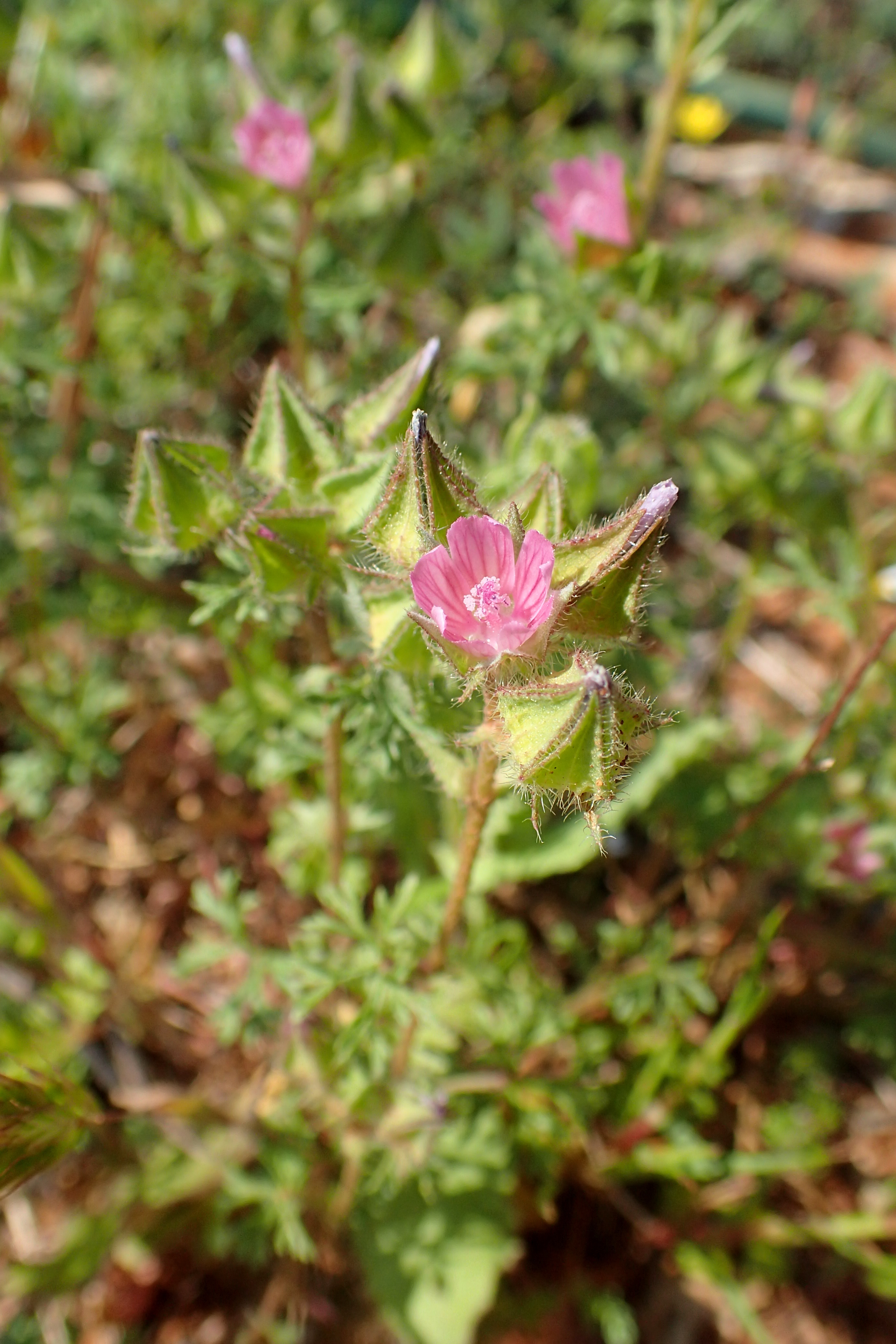
- Flower and flower buds
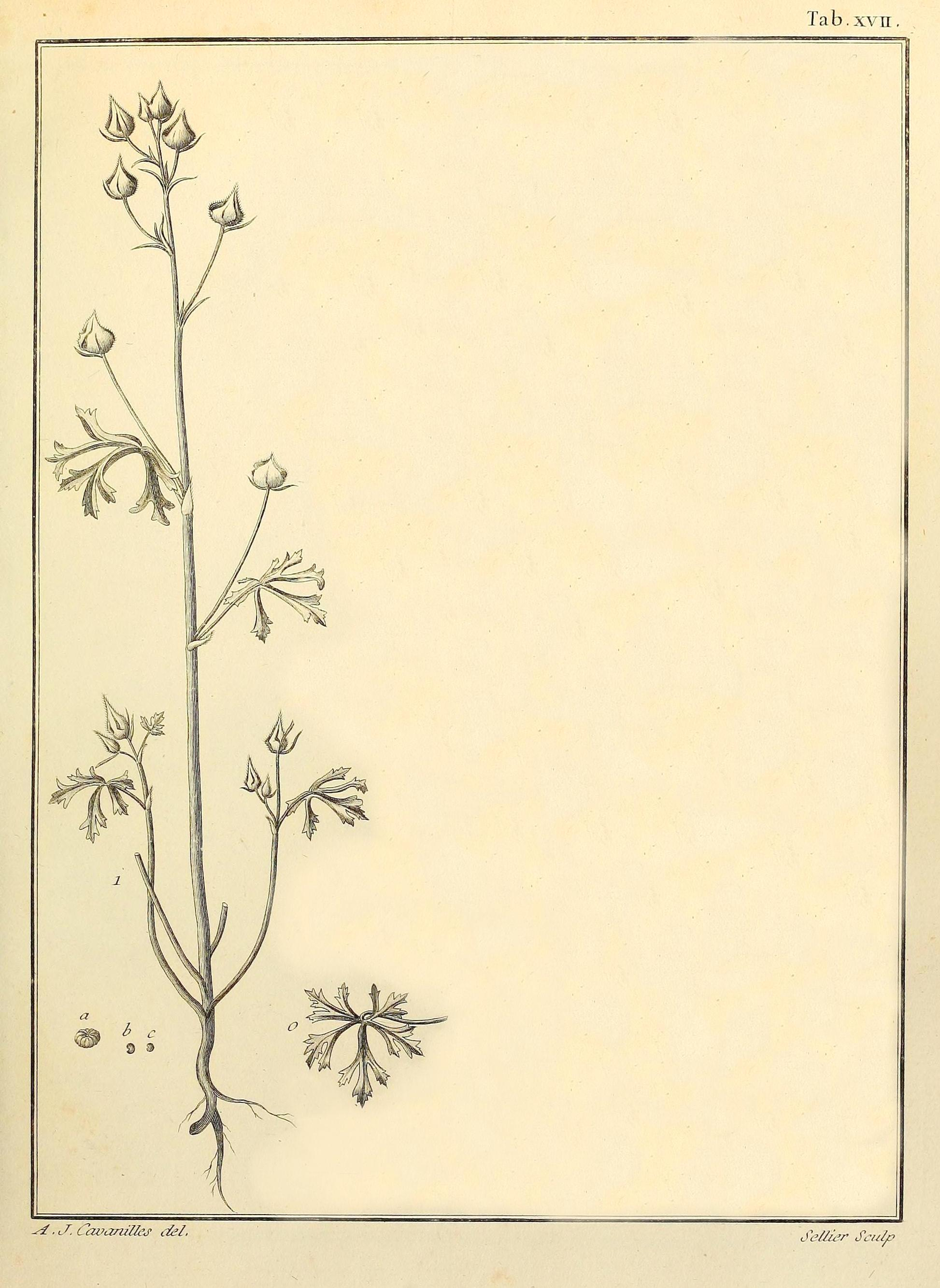
- Botanical illustration

Scientific classification
- Kingdom: Plantae
- Clade: Embryophytes
- Clade: Tracheophytes
- Clade: Angiosperms
- Clade: Eudicots
- Clade: Rosids
- Order: Malvales
- Family: Malvaceae
- Genus: Malva
- Species: M. aegyptia

Binomial name
- Malva aegyptia L.

Synonyms
- List: Axolopha aegyptia Alef.; Dinacrusa aegyptia (L.) G.Krebs; Malva aegyptia var. armeniaca (Iljin) Pakravan; Malva aegyptiaca Steud.; Malva armeniaca Iljin; Malva diphylla Moench; Malva effimbriata Iljin; Malva elegantifolia Iljin; Malva iljinii I.Riedl; Malva latisecta Iljin; Malva leiocarpa Iljin; Malva libyca Pomel; Malva mediterranea Iljin; Malva pichleri Iljin

= Malva aegyptia =

Species of flowering plant

Malva aegyptia, the Egyptian mallow, is a species of flowering plant in the family Malvaceae. It is native to North Africa, Spain, Greece, and western Asia as far as Turkmenistan, and has been introduced to South Africa. With Althaea hirsuta it is a parent of the ancient hybrid × Malvalthaea transcaucasica.
