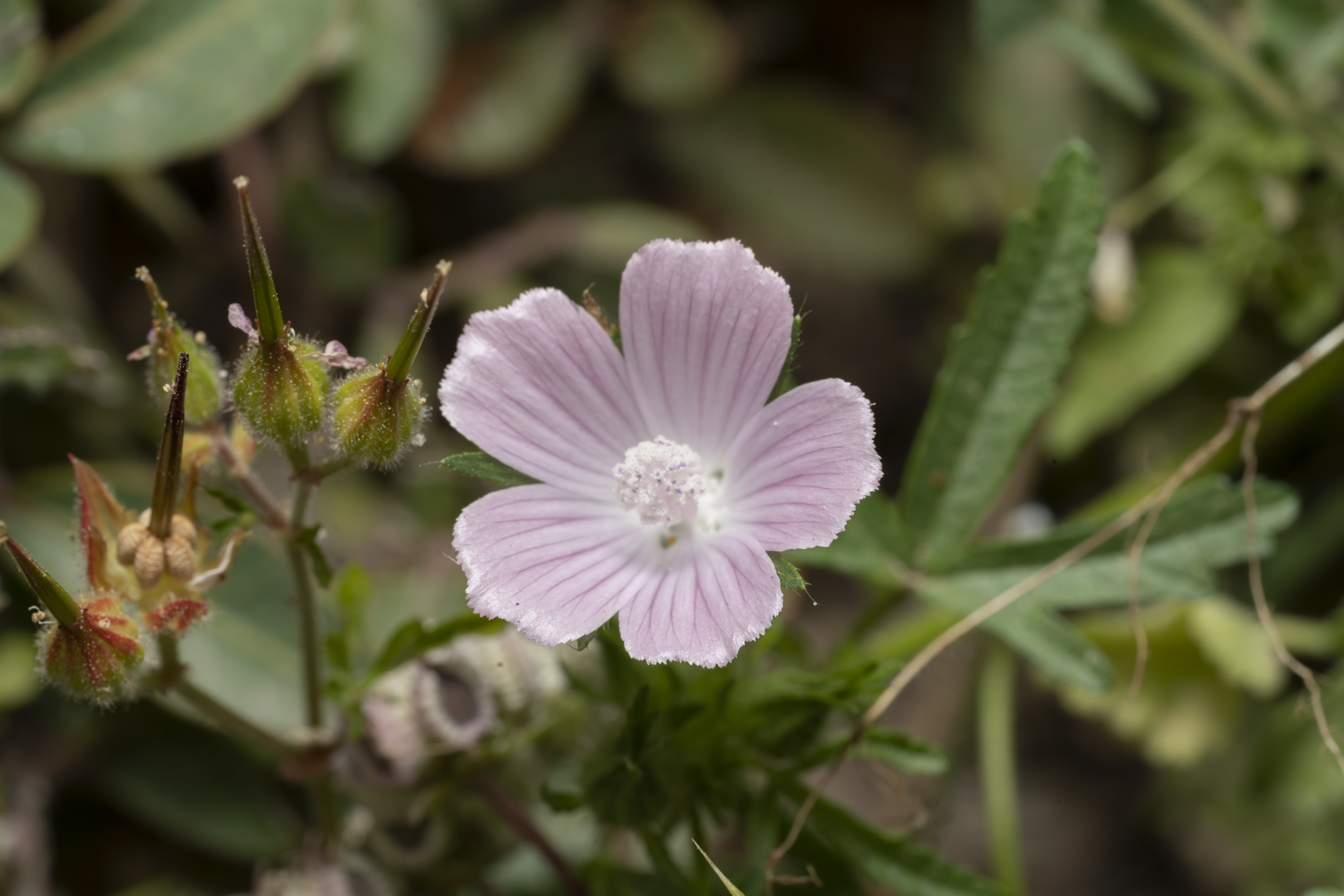

Scientific classification
- Kingdom: Plantae
- Clade: Tracheophytes
- Clade: Angiosperms
- Clade: Eudicots
- Clade: Rosids
- Order: Malvales
- Family: Malvaceae
- Genus: Malva
- Species: M. cretica

Binomial name
- Malva cretica Cav.

Synonyms
- Althaea hirsuta Sieber ex Steud.; Dinacrusa cretica (Cav.) G.Krebs; Malva hirsuta Ten.

= Malva cretica =

Species of flowering plant

Malva cretica is a species of flowering plant in the family Malvaceae, native to Tunisia, Sardinia, Corsica, Sicily, Italy, Albania, Greece, the eastern Aegean Islands, Crete, Cyprus, and Turkey, and introduced to France. There may be a subspecies, Malva cretica subsp. althaeoides, present in Spain.
