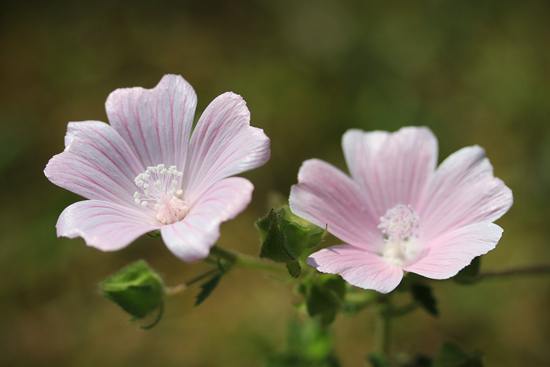
- Flowers
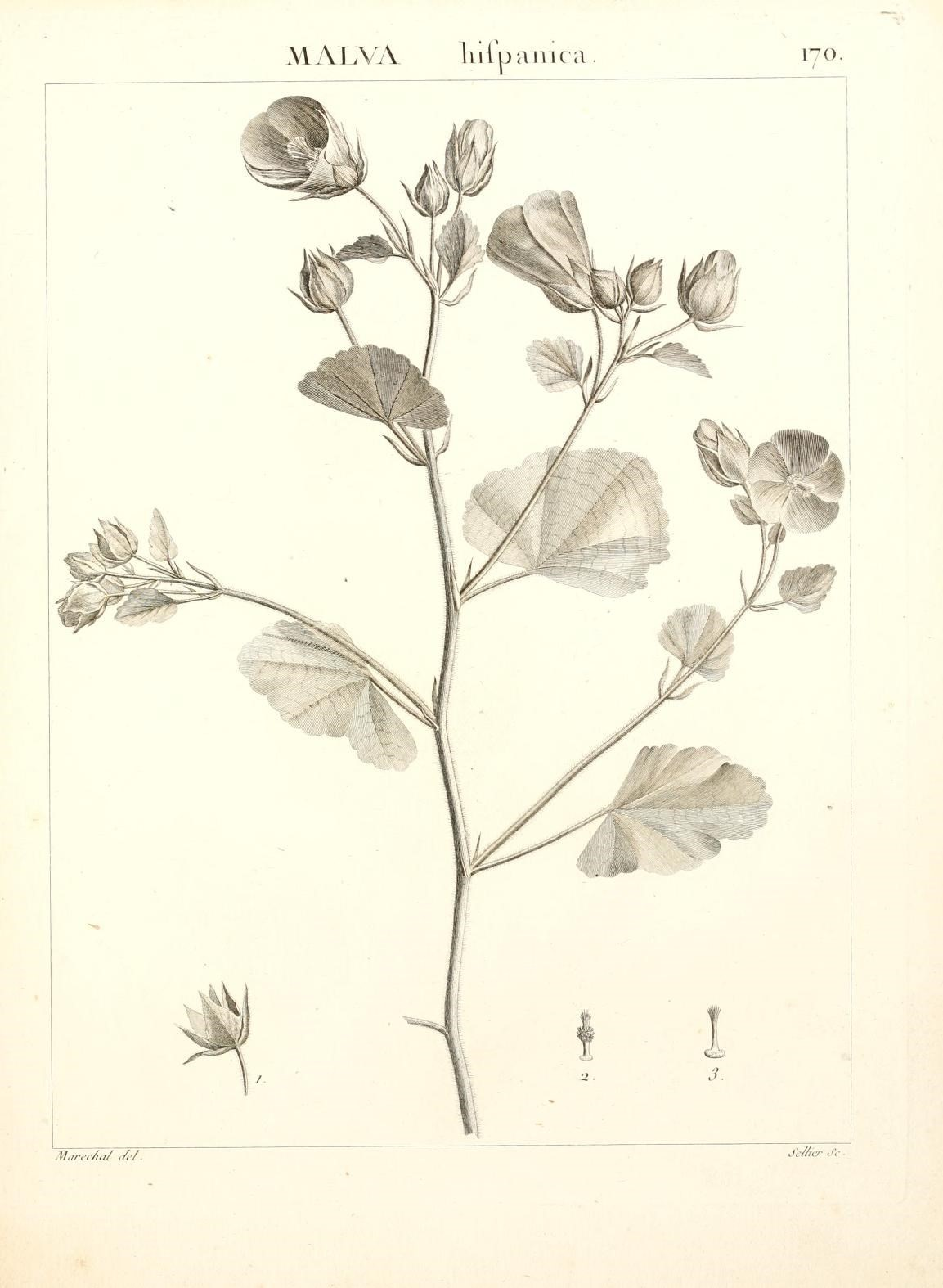
- Botanical illustration

Scientific classification
- Kingdom: Plantae
- Clade: Tracheophytes
- Clade: Angiosperms
- Clade: Eudicots
- Clade: Rosids
- Order: Malvales
- Family: Malvaceae
- Genus: Malva
- Species: M. hispanica

Binomial name
- Malva hispanica L.

Synonyms
- Malva cuneifolia Cav.; Malva spithamea Cav.

= Malva hispanica =

Species of flowering plant

Malva hispanica, the Spanish mallow, is a species of flowering plant in the family Malvaceae, native to the western Mediterranean. Uniquely in its genus, Malva hispanica flowers possess a bilobed epicalyx, which is derived from an ancestral trimerous structure and represents a loss of the adaxial epicalyx lobe.
