= Malva ludwigii =

Scientific classification
- Kingdom: Plantae
- Clade: Tracheophytes
- Clade: Angiosperms
- Clade: Eudicots
- Clade: Rosids
- Order: Malvales
- Family: Malvaceae
- Genus: Malva
- Species: M. ludwigii

Binomial name
- Malva ludwigii (L.) Soldano, Banfi & Galasso]]

Synonyms
- List: Althaea gariepina E.Mey. ex Boiss.; Althaea garipensis E.Mey.; Althaea laevis Moench; Althaea ludwigii L.; Althaea ludwigii var. microcalyculata Dobignard; Axolopha ludwigii (L.) Alef.; Dinacrusa ludwigii (L.) G.Krebs; Malva malwensis Edgew.

Species of flowering plant

Malva ludwigii (syn. Althaea ludwigii) is a widespread species of flowering plant in the family Malvaceae. It is native to northern Africa, the Middle East, central Asia, and India, and disjunctly to Namibia and South Africa. A desert-adapted annual, it is also somewhat weedy, being found in cultivated land and on roadsides.
