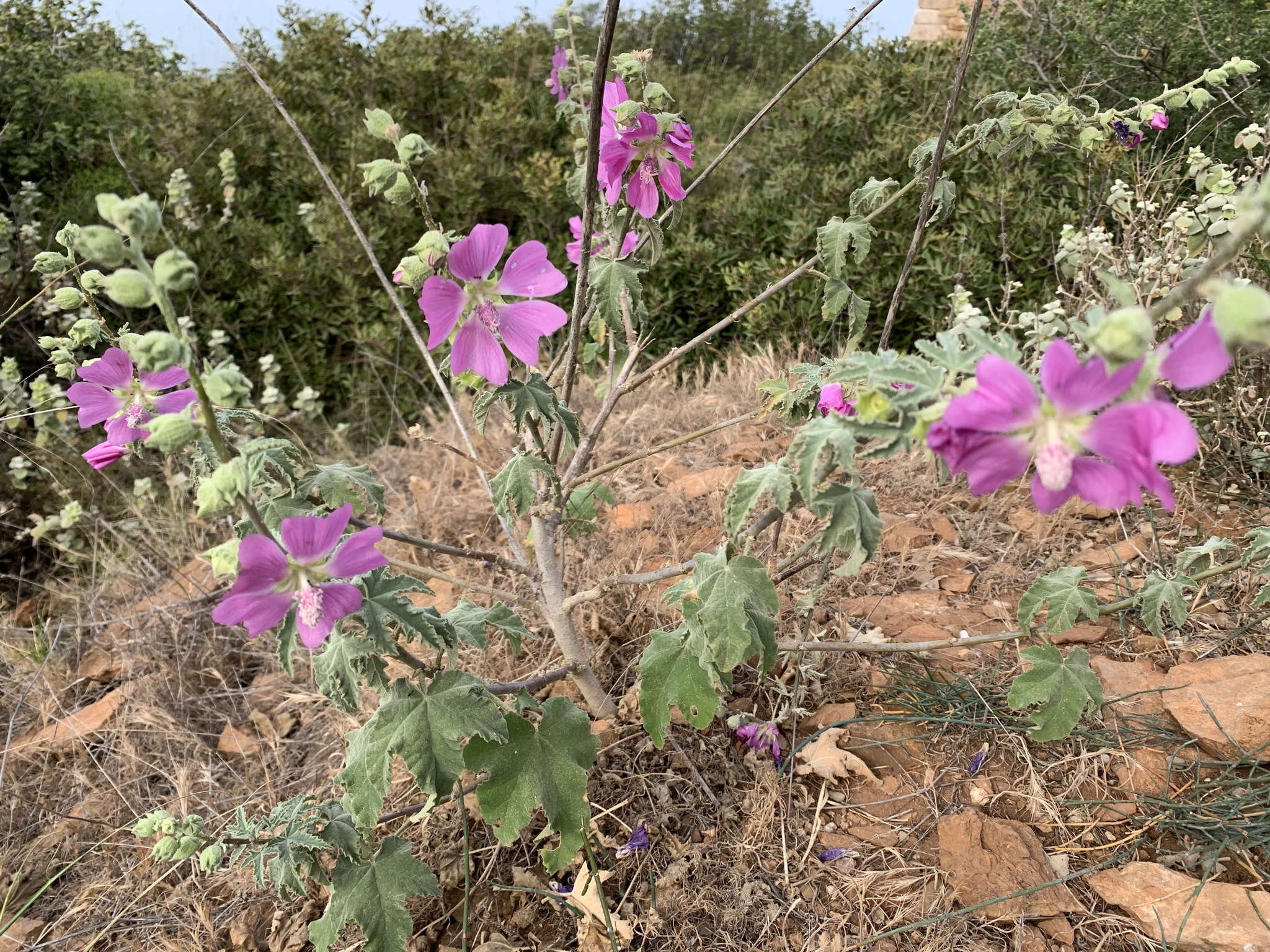

Scientific classification
- Kingdom: Plantae
- Clade: Embryophytes
- Clade: Tracheophytes
- Clade: Angiosperms
- Clade: Eudicots
- Clade: Rosids
- Order: Malvales
- Family: Malvaceae
- Genus: Malva
- Species: M. unguiculata

Binomial name
- Malva unguiculata (Desf.) Alef.

Synonyms
- Synonym list: Althaea unguiculata (Desf.) Kuntze; Lavatera unguiculata Desf.; Lavatera bryoniifolia Mill.; Lavatera sphaciotica Gand.; Lavatera tomentosa Dum.Cours.

= Malva unguiculata =

Species of flowering plant in the mallow family

Malva unguiculata, the bryony-leaved tree-mallow, is a very tall perennial tree-mallow with large pink flowers native to the East Mediterranean.

== Description ==
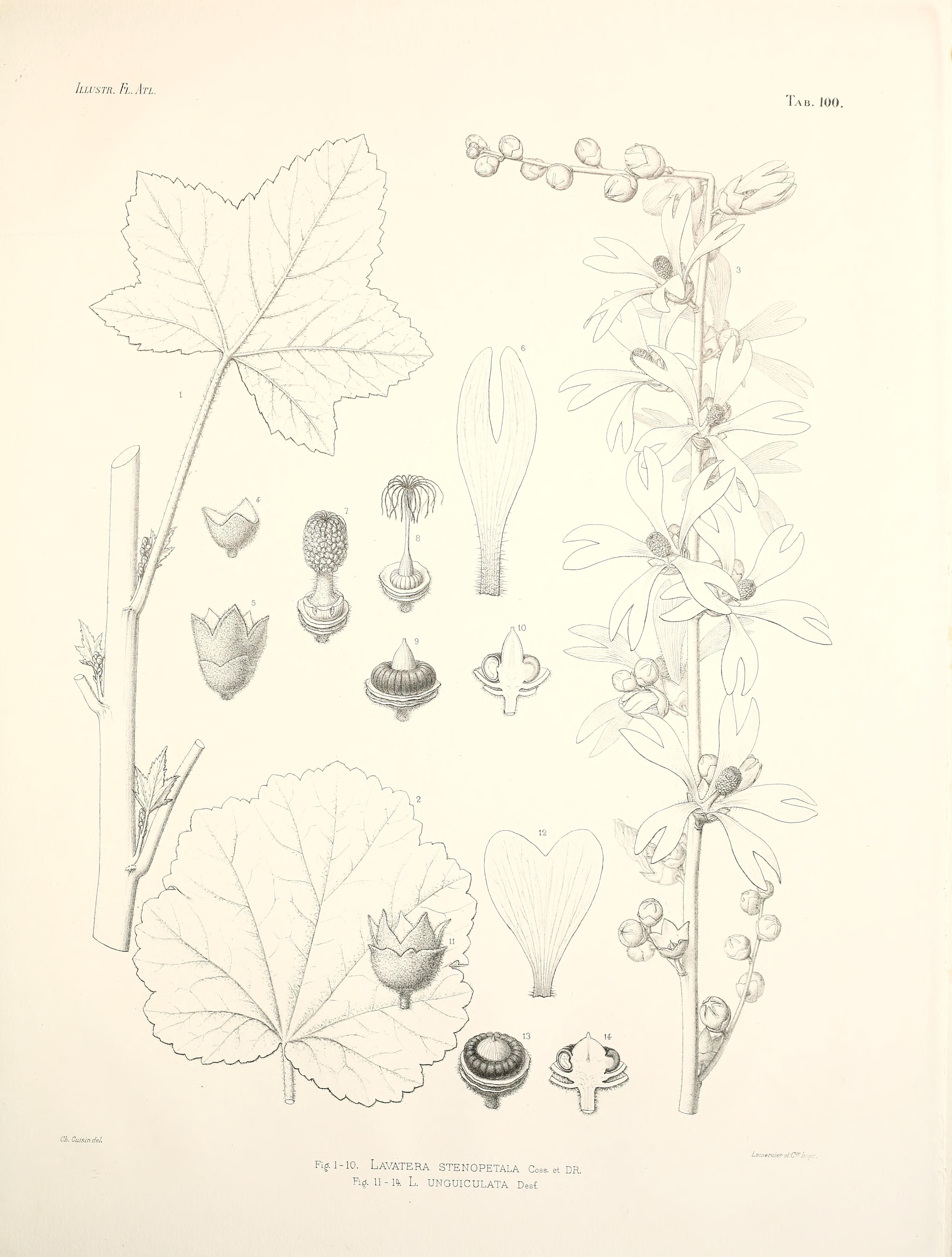
Malva unguiculata fig. 11–14

A very tall (3 m) tree-mallow, notable for the 3–5-triangular-lobed leaves whose end lobes are much to very much larger than the side lobes. The pinkish to violet flowers (petals 20–25 mm) have pale centres and are in groups of 1–2 at the leaf stalks, flower stalks short, reaching only 15 mm at fruiting. Found at cliffs and streambanks, in Turkey 0–130 m.

The stem below is trunk-like and hairless, parts above with starlike hairs (stellate) giving a dusty whitened look.

The 3-part epicalyx is stellate-haired and mostly embraces the calyx like a cup. Fruit segments are rough but not rugose.

== Distribution ==
Cyprus, East Aegean Is., Greece, Crete, Libya, Palestine, Sicilia, Turkey.
