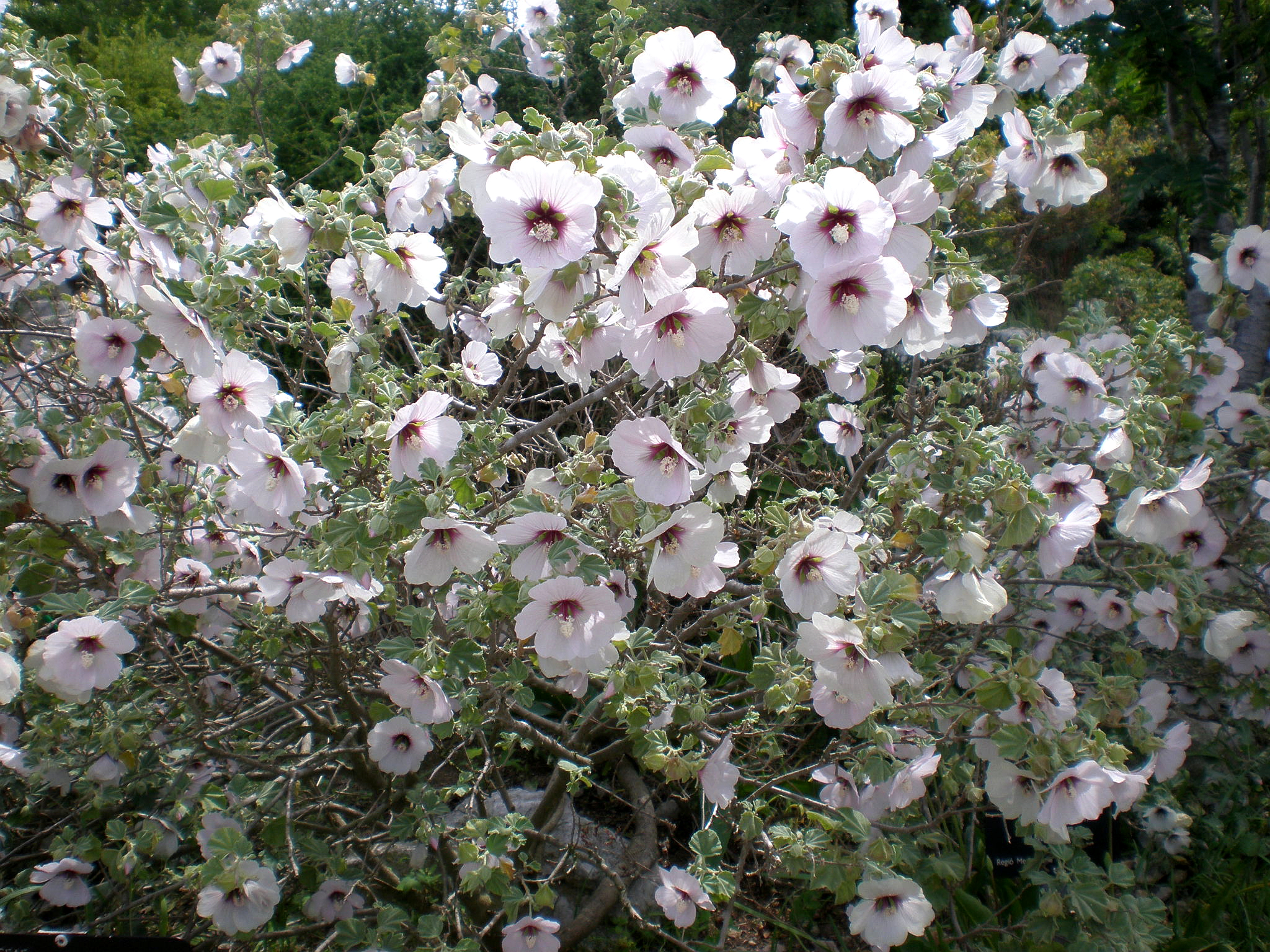
- At the Jardí Botànic de Barcelona
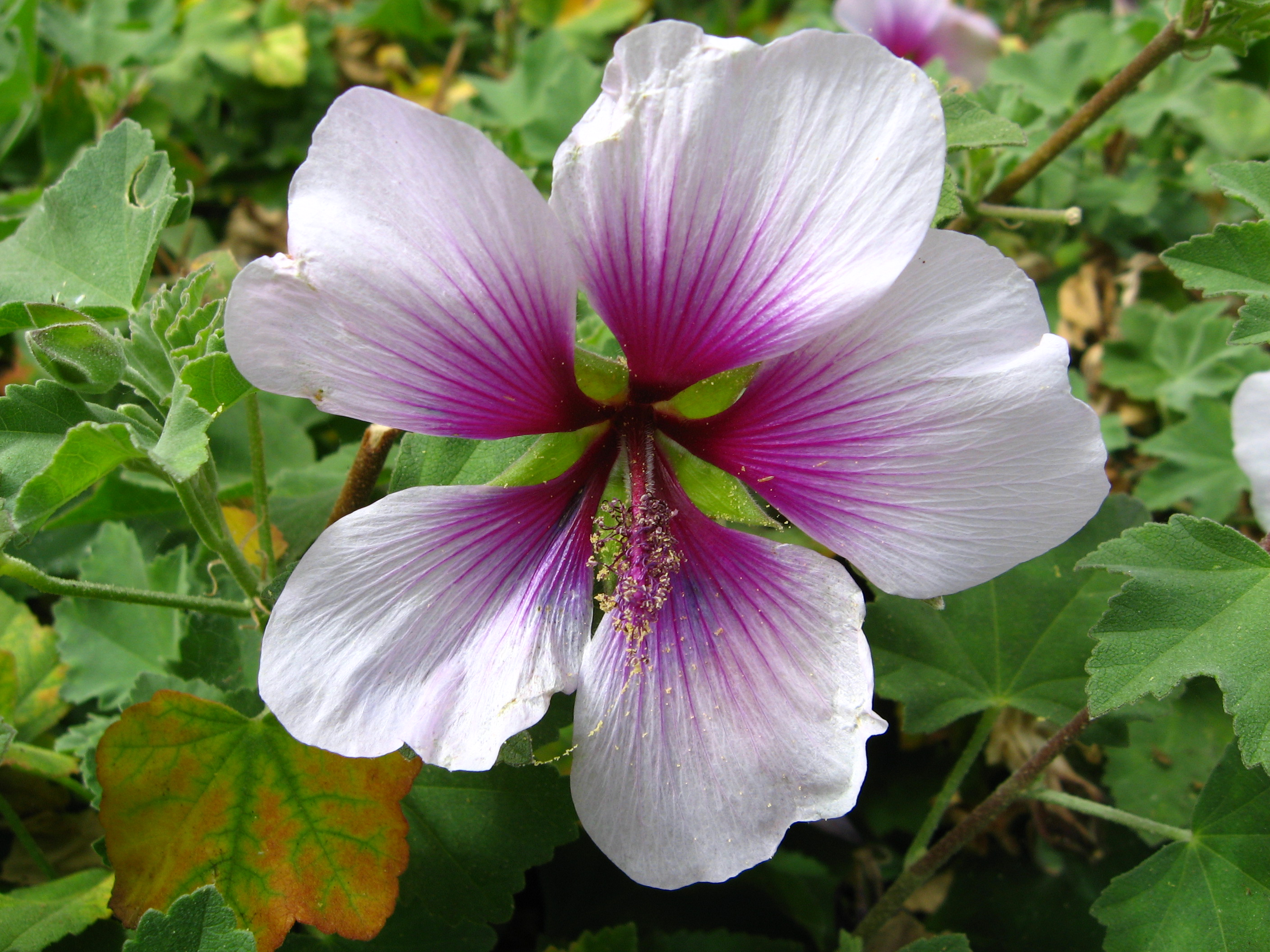
- Close-up of flower

Scientific classification
- Kingdom: Plantae
- Clade: Tracheophytes
- Clade: Angiosperms
- Clade: Eudicots
- Clade: Rosids
- Order: Malvales
- Family: Malvaceae
- Genus: Malva
- Species: M. subovata

Binomial name
- Malva subovata (DC.) Molero & J.M.Monts.

Synonyms
- List: Althaea maritima (Gouan) Kuntze; Althaea micans (L.) Kuntze; Axolopha maritima (Gouan) Alef.; Axolopha wigandii Alef.; Lavatera bicolor Rouy; Lavatera gallica Nyman; Lavatera hispanica Mill.; Lavatera maritima Gouan; Lavatera maritima subsp. bicolor (Rouy) Rouy; Lavatera maritima subsp. rupestris (Pomel) Greuter & Burdet; Lavatera micans L.; Lavatera rupestris Pomel; Lavatera subovata DC.; Malva africana (Cav.) Soldano, Banfi & Galasso; Malva africana subsp. bicolor (Rouy) Soldano, Banfi & Galasso; Malva maritima (Gouan) Pau; Malva micans (L.) Alef.; Malva subovata subsp. rupestris (Pomel) Molero & J.M.Monts.; Malva wigandii (Alef.) M.F.Ray; Malva wigandii f. bicolor (Rouy) B.Bock; Olbia canescens Moench; Olbia micans (L.) Moench

= Malva subovata =

Species of flowering plant

Malva subovata, or the tree mallow, is a species of flowering plant in the family Malvaceae, native to the shores of the western and central Mediterranean. When previously known as Lavatera maritima it gained the Royal Horticultural Society's Award of Garden Merit.

== Subtaxa ==
The following subspecies are accepted:

- Malva subovata subsp. bicolor (Rouy) Iamonico
- Malva subovata subsp. subovata
