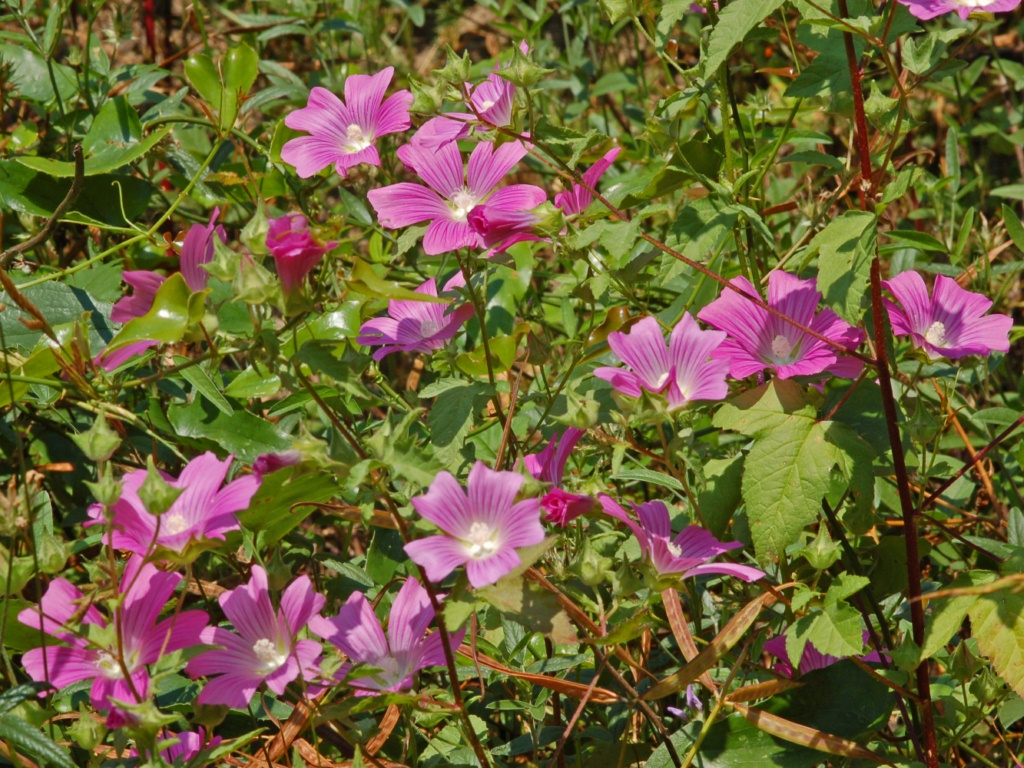

Scientific classification
- Kingdom: Plantae
- Clade: Tracheophytes
- Clade: Angiosperms
- Clade: Eudicots
- Clade: Rosids
- Order: Malvales
- Family: Malvaceae
- Genus: Malva
- Species: M. punctata

Binomial name
- Malva punctata All. Alef.

Synonyms
- Lavatera biennis M.Bieb.; Lavatera micans sensu Pau; Althaea punctata Kuntze; Lavatera thuringiaca Savi; Lavatera punctata L.; Olbia deflexa Presl

= Malva punctata =

Species of tree

Malva punctata (previously known as Lavatera punctata), commonly called spotted-stalked tree-mallow or annual tree mallow, is an annual herbaceous plant belonging to the genus Malva of the family Malvaceae.

== Description ==
Malva punctata reaches on average 20–90 cm (7.9–35.4 in) of height. The stem is erect and covered with scattered hairs. The leaves are alternate, trilobed with the central lobe larger than the others, petiolate with stipules, the lowest are kidney-shaped and slightly lobed, while the upper ones are pentagonal. The flowers grow in the axils of the leaves. Calyx is campanulate, five-lobed, with five triangular pink petals with purple veins, of about 15–3 centimetres (5.9–1.2 in), three times longer than the calyx. The flowering period extends from May through June.

== Distribution ==
Plant of western Mediterranean origin is distributed from the South of France and Italy to Albania, Greece, Palestine, Israel, Asia Minor and Turkey.

== Habitat ==
These plants grow at an altitude of 0–600 metres (0–1,969 ft) above sea level. They prefer rocky soils in sunny areas and fallow fields, hedgerows, beds of streams and road margins.

== Botanical gallery ==
Photos from Antalya except where indicated

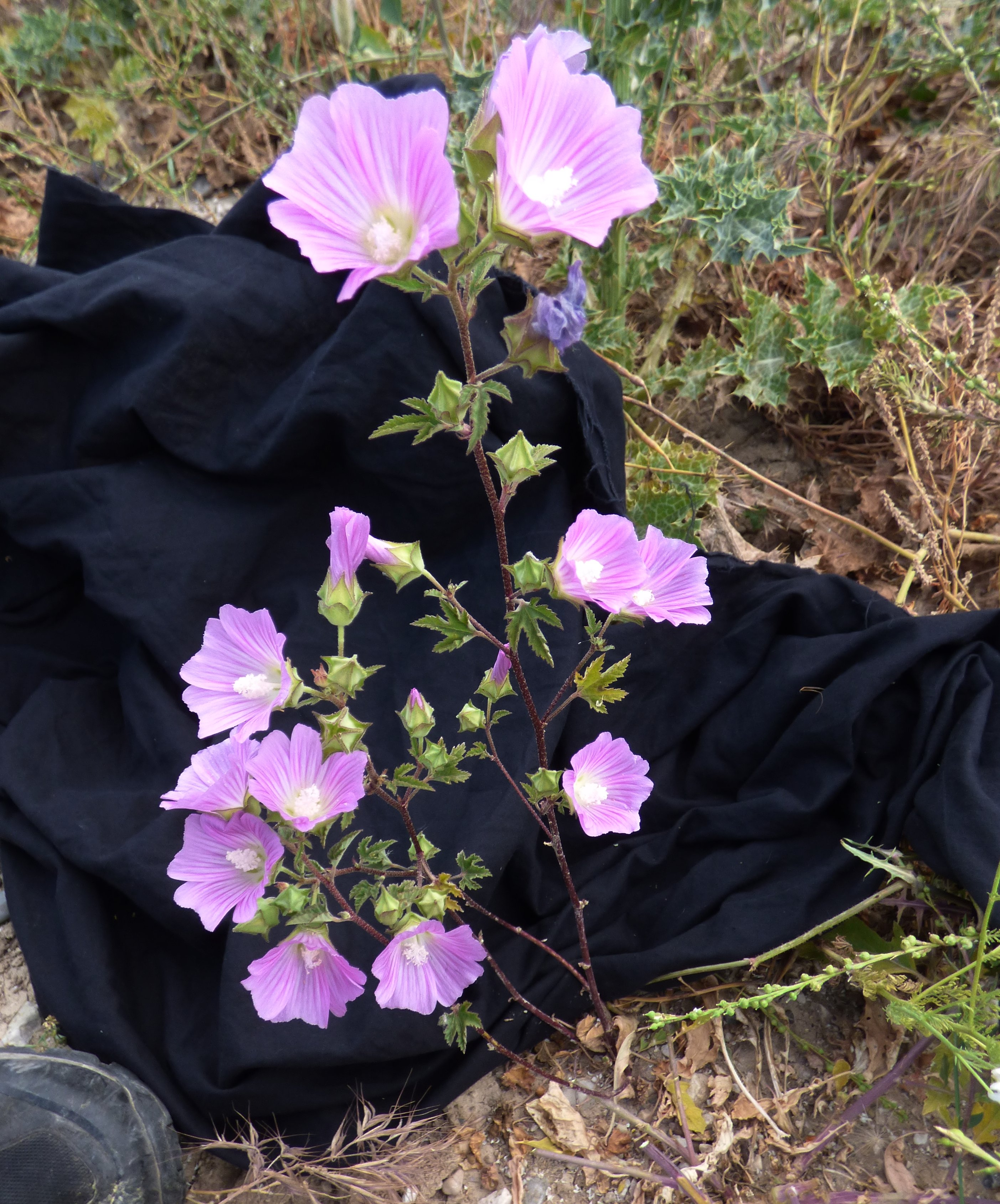
General appearance

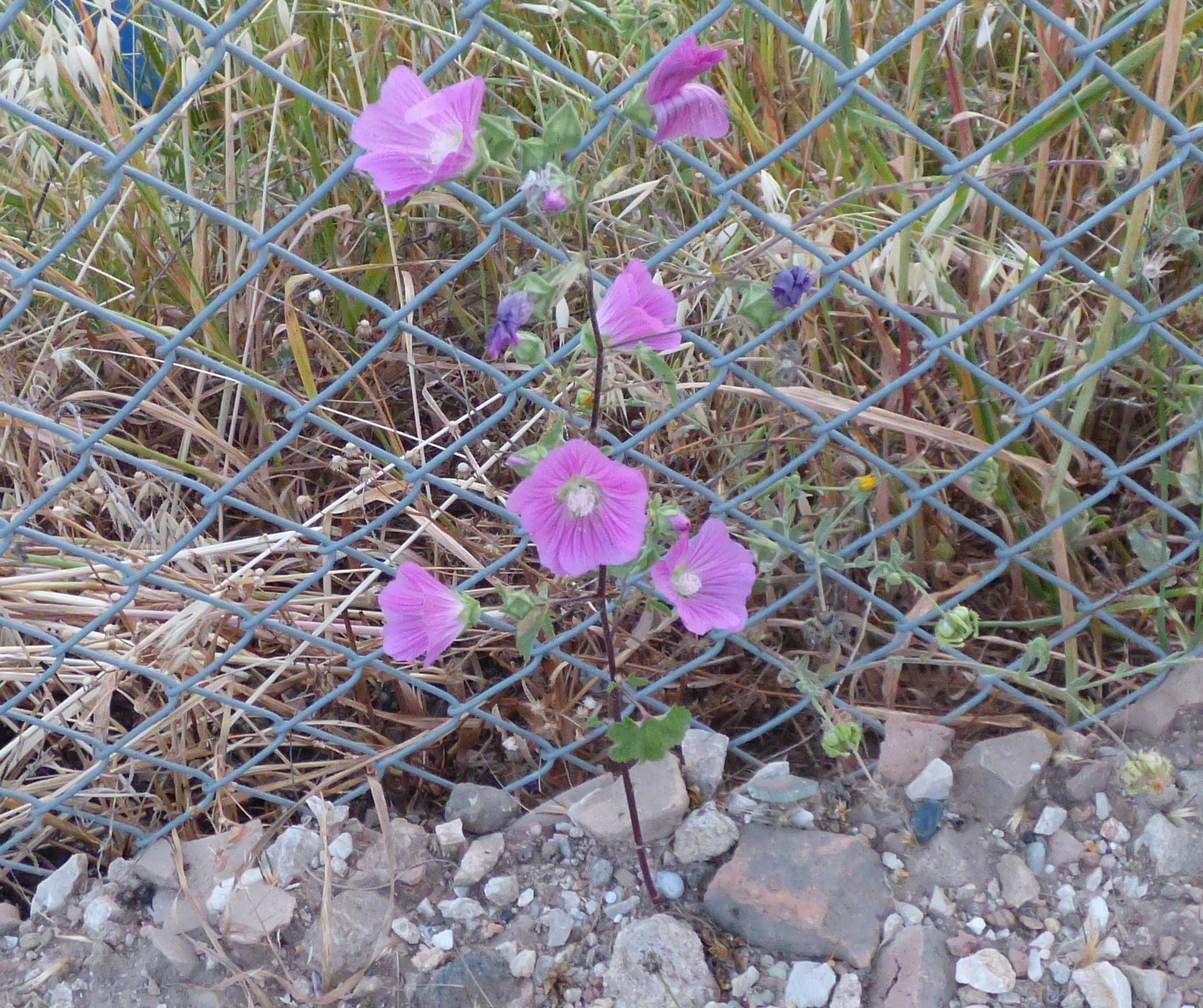
General appearance

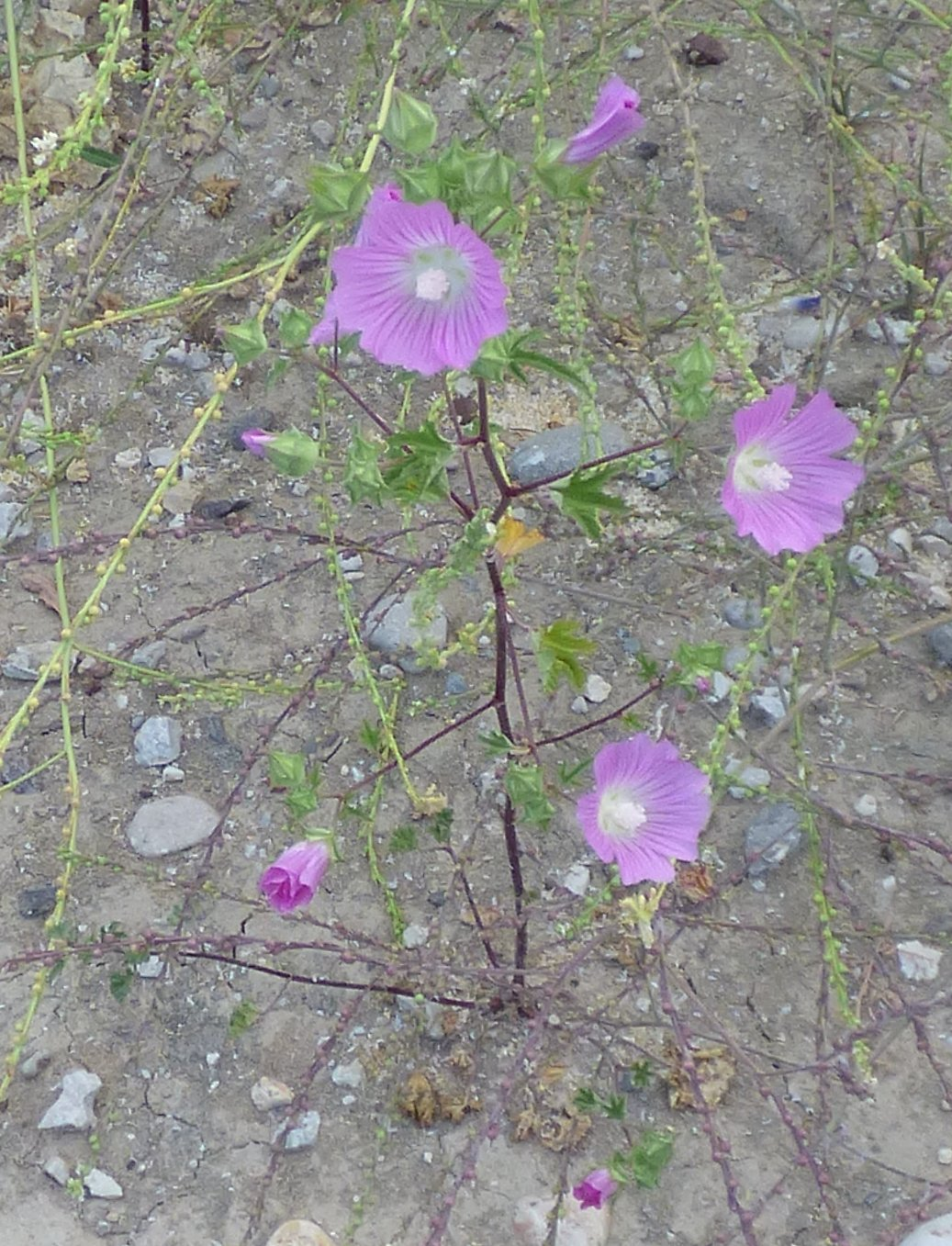
General appearance

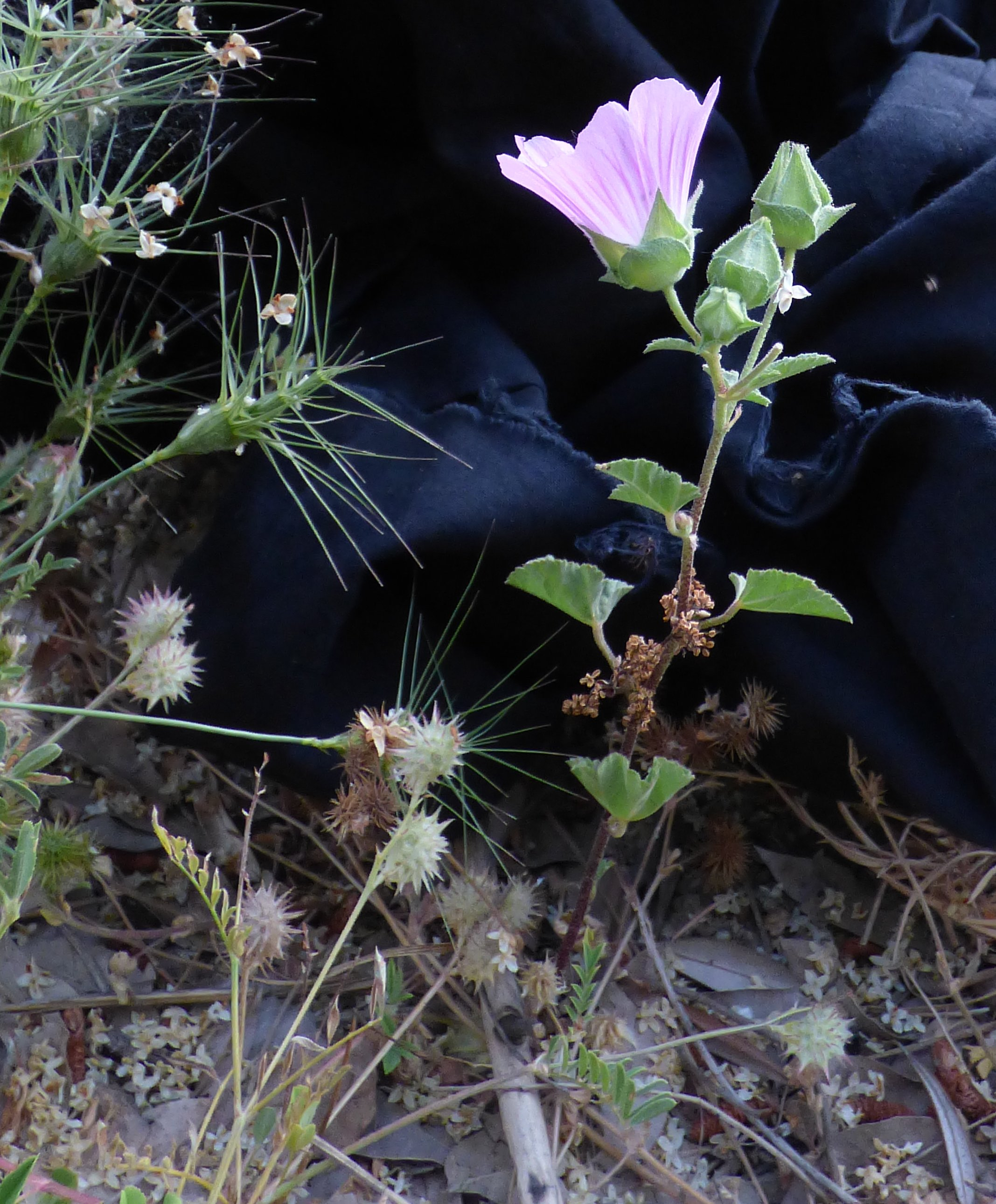
General appearance

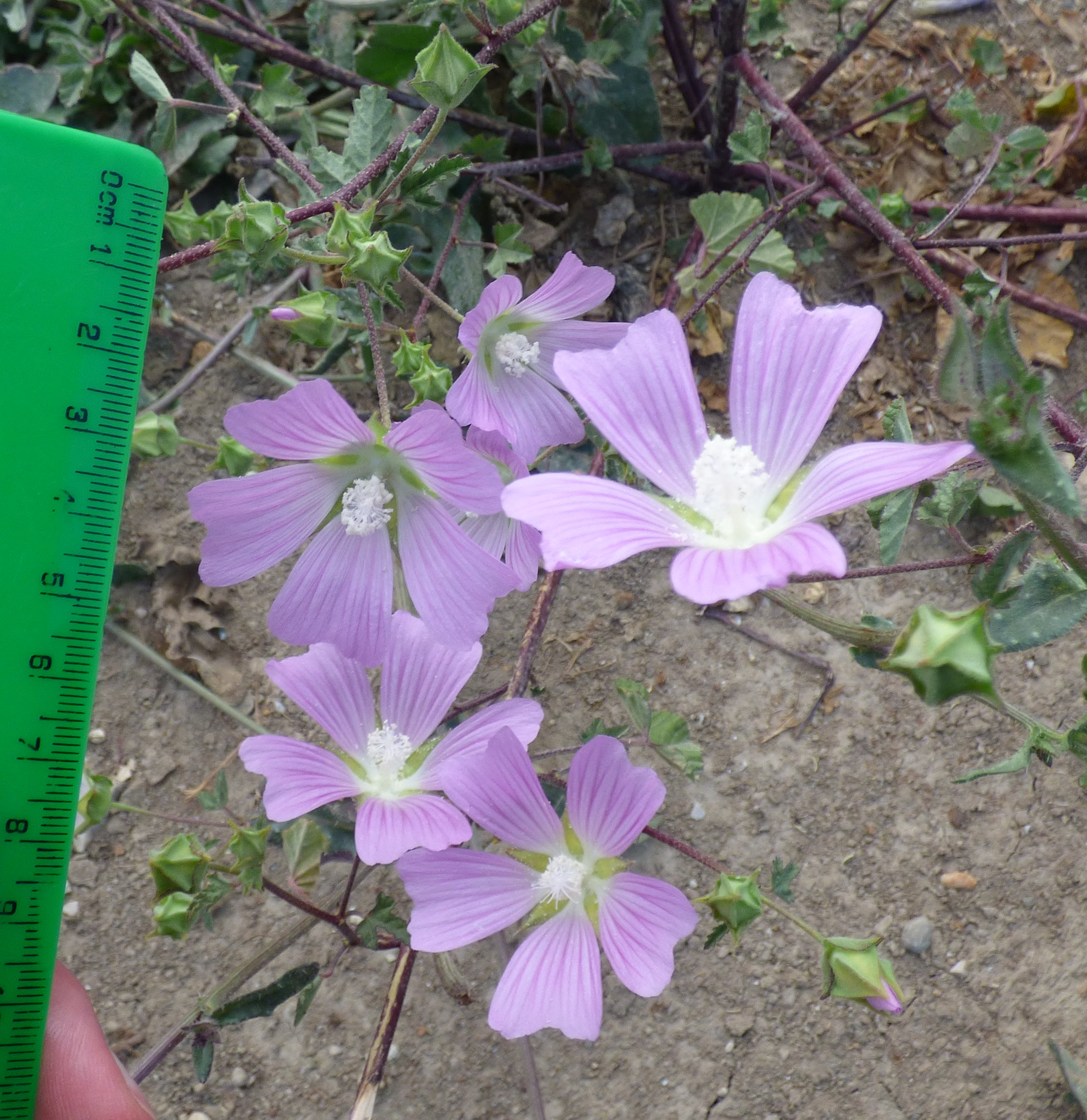
Flowers

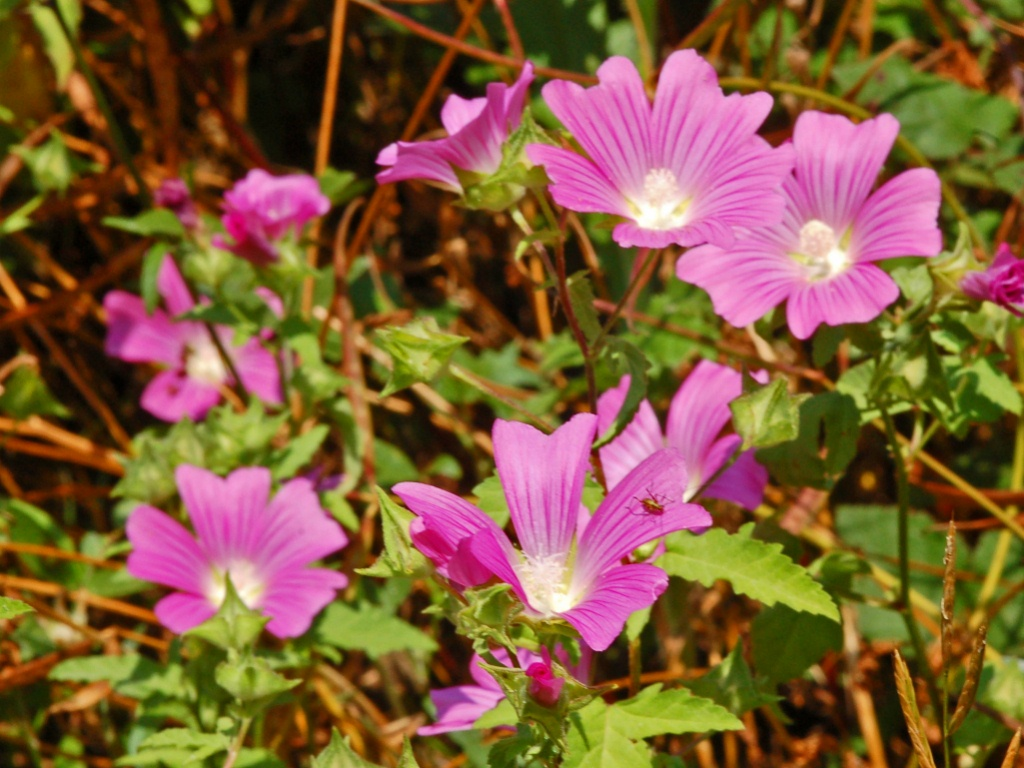
Flowers, bolder coloured (Italy)

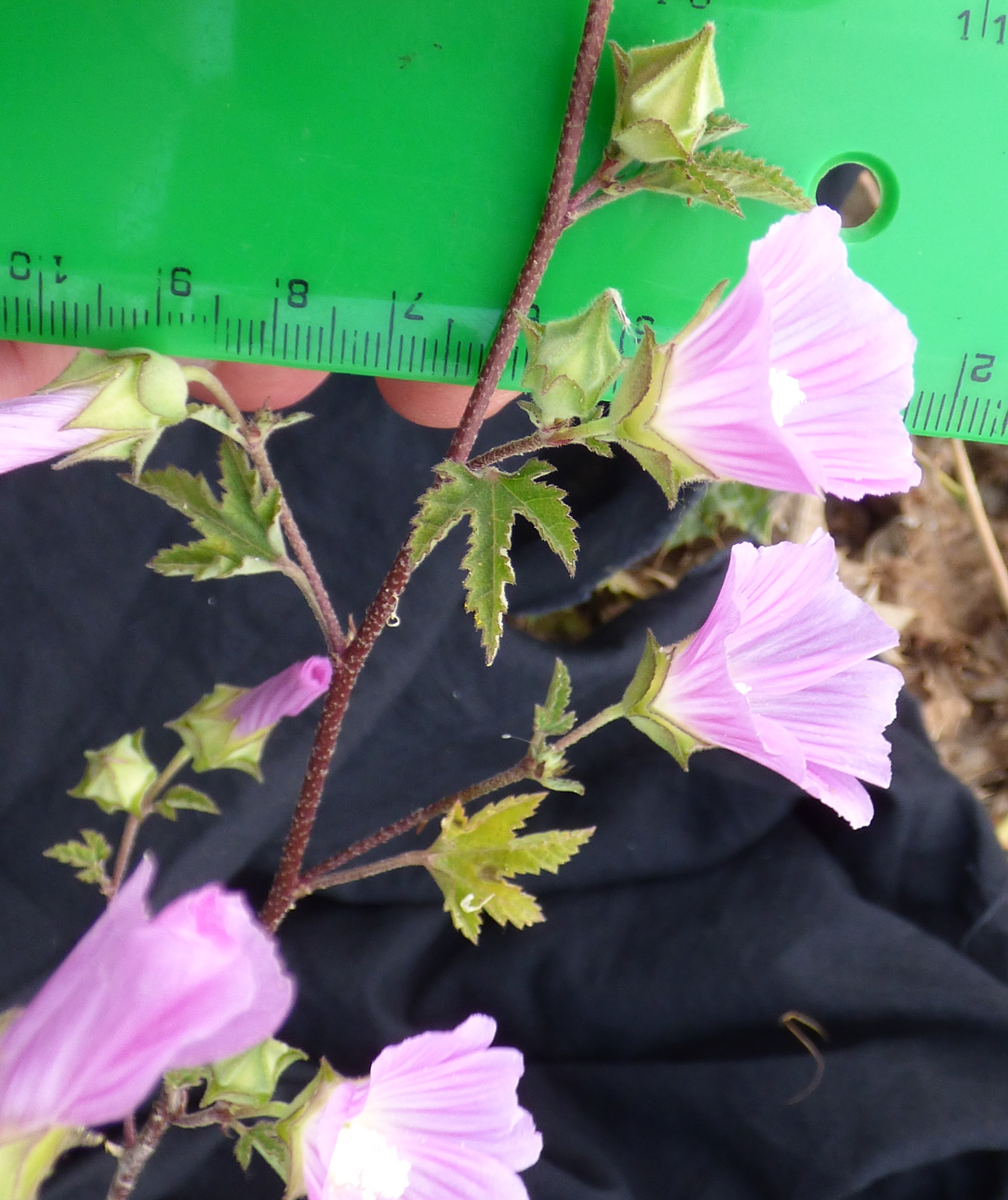
Inflorescence with upper leaves

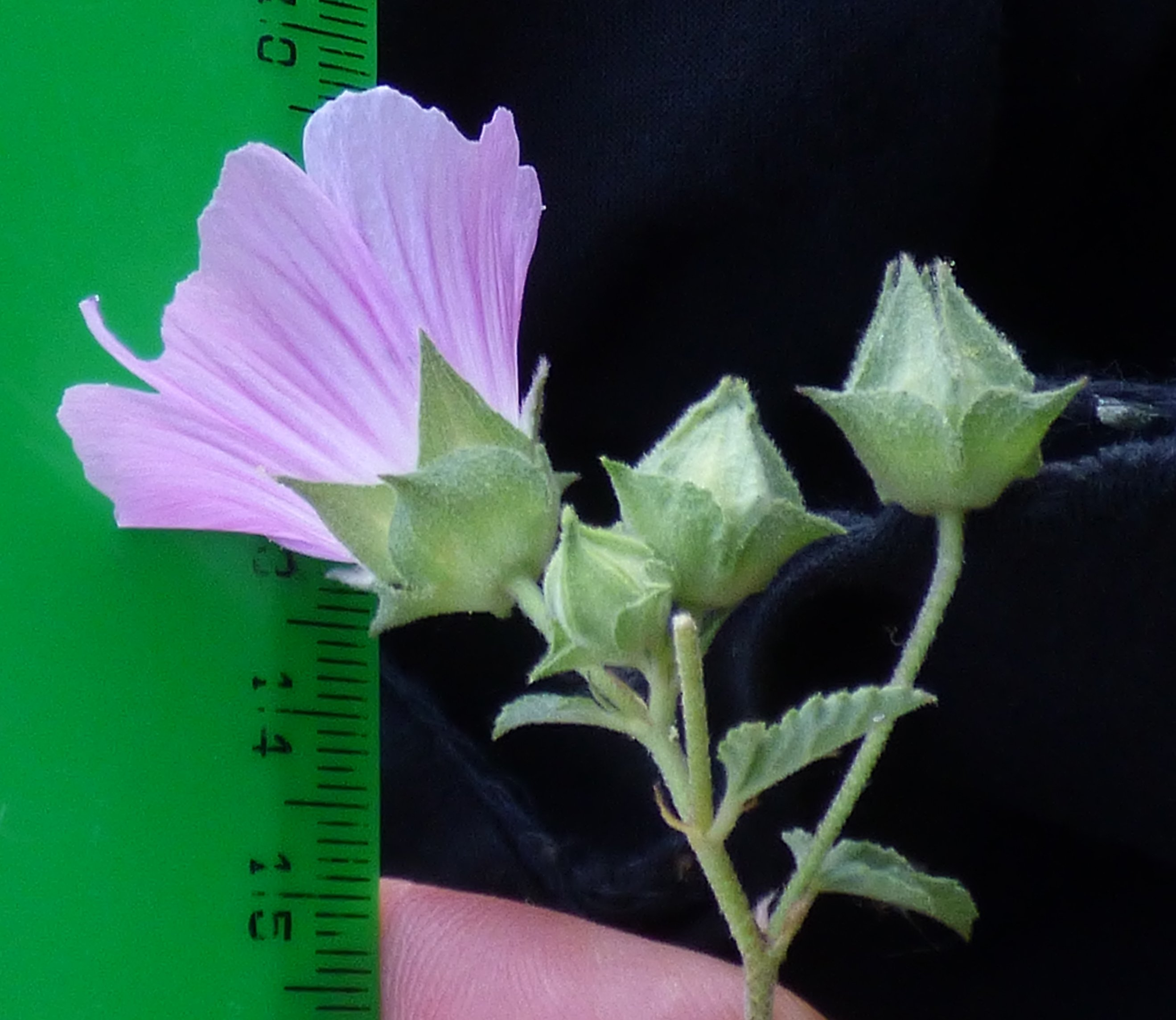
Flowers showing 5-part calyx, with outer 3-part epicalyx (the 3 parts broad)

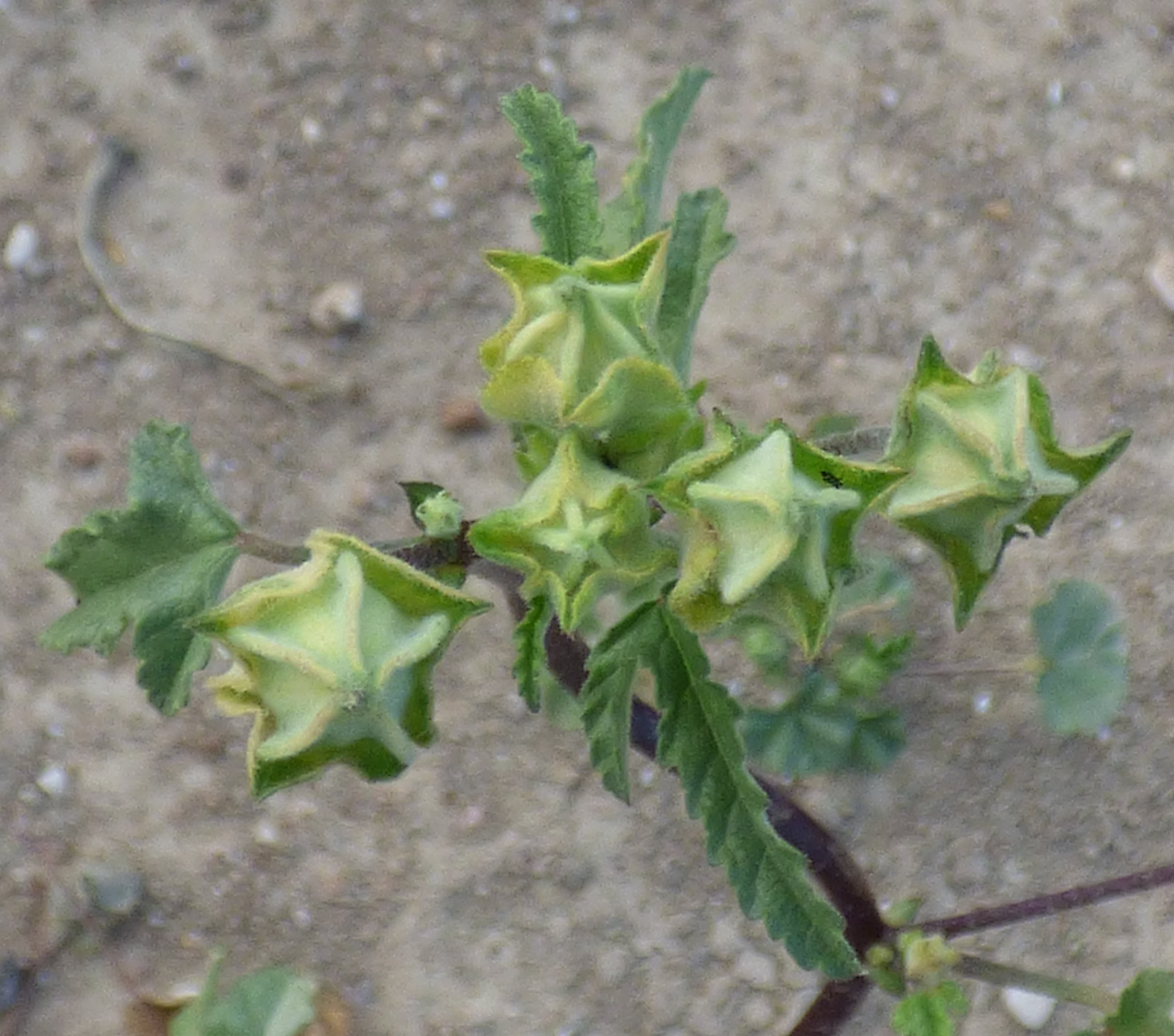
Unopened flowers showing 5-part calyx and 3-broad-part epicalyx

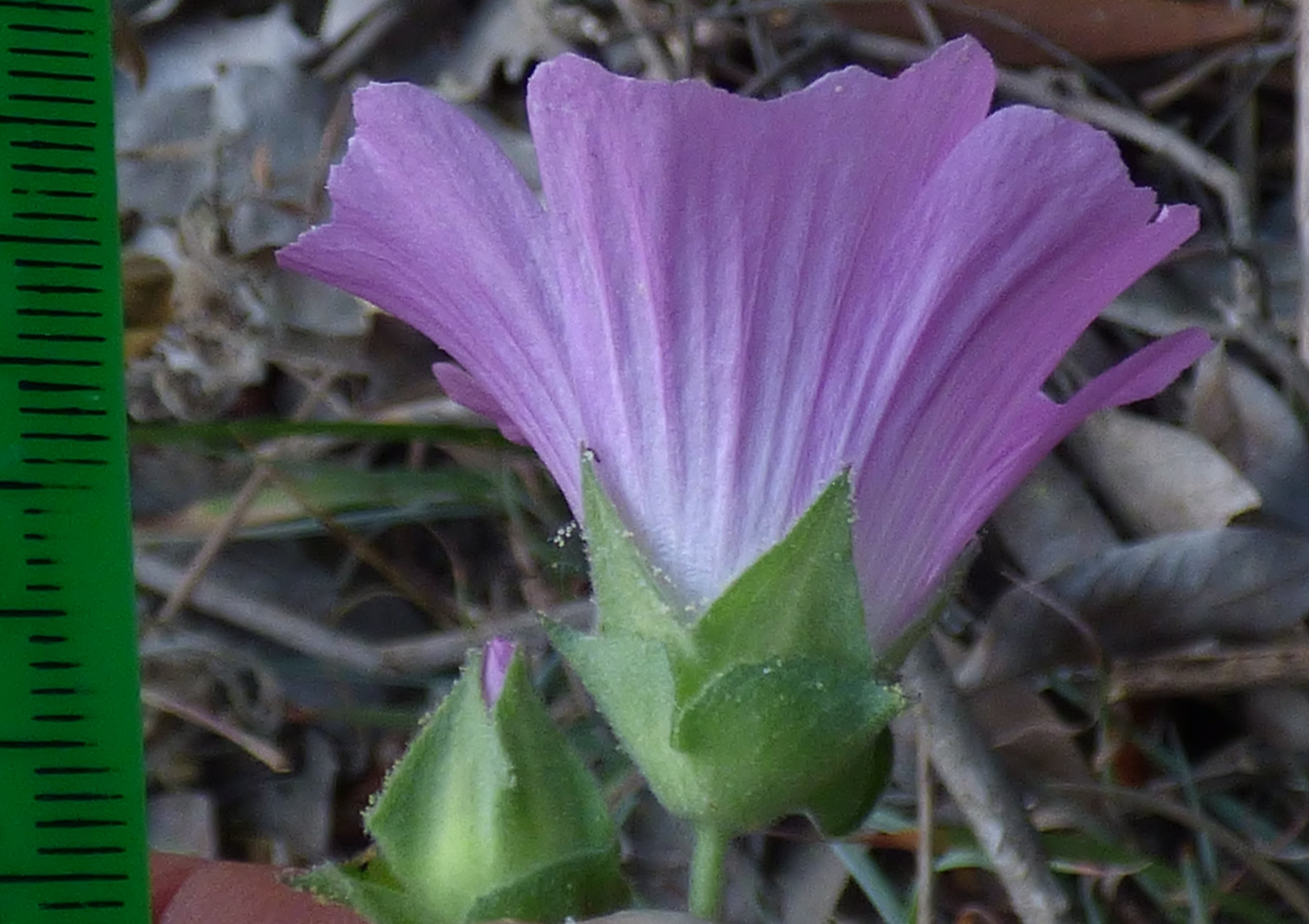
Flower, side

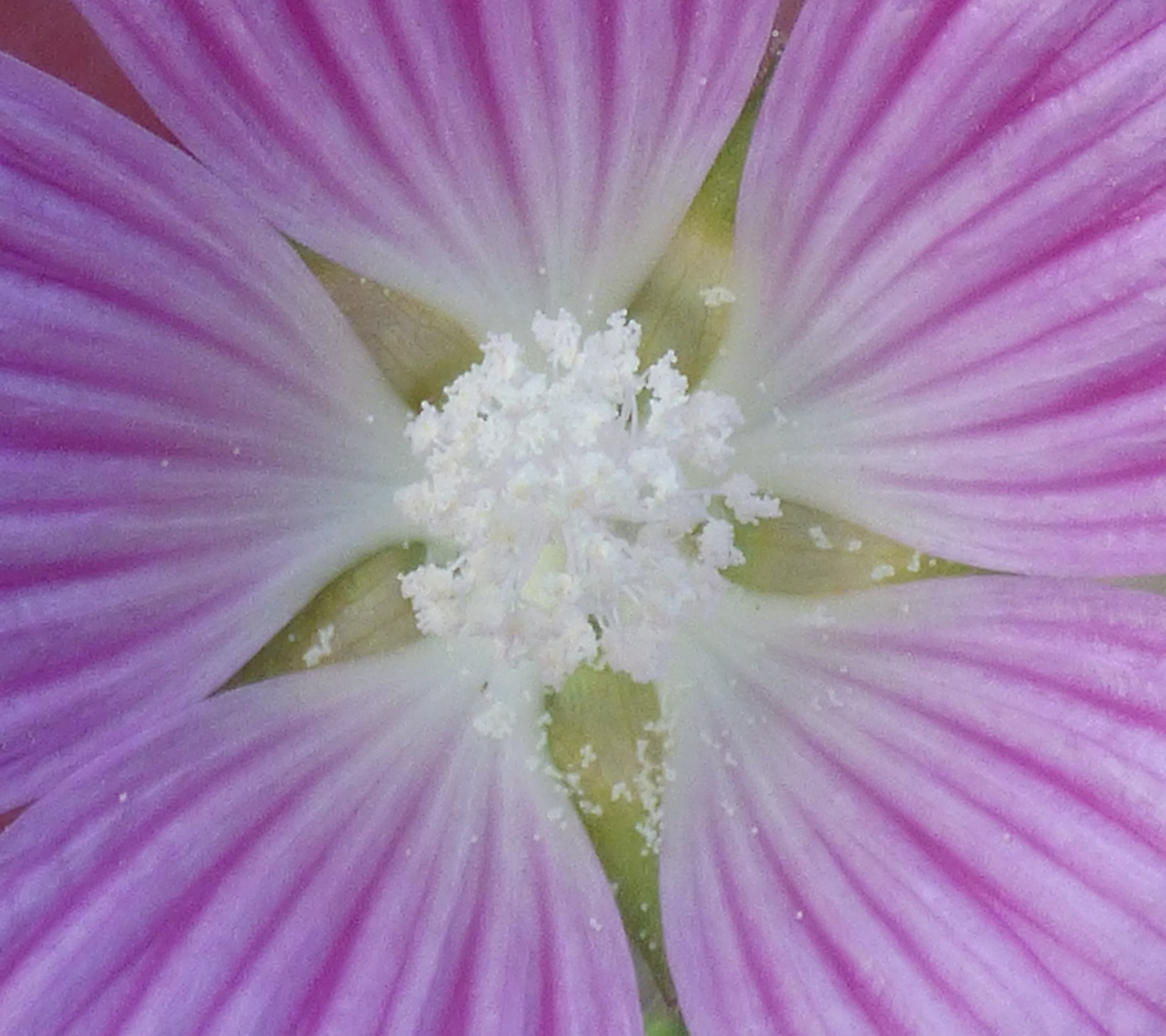
Flower centre

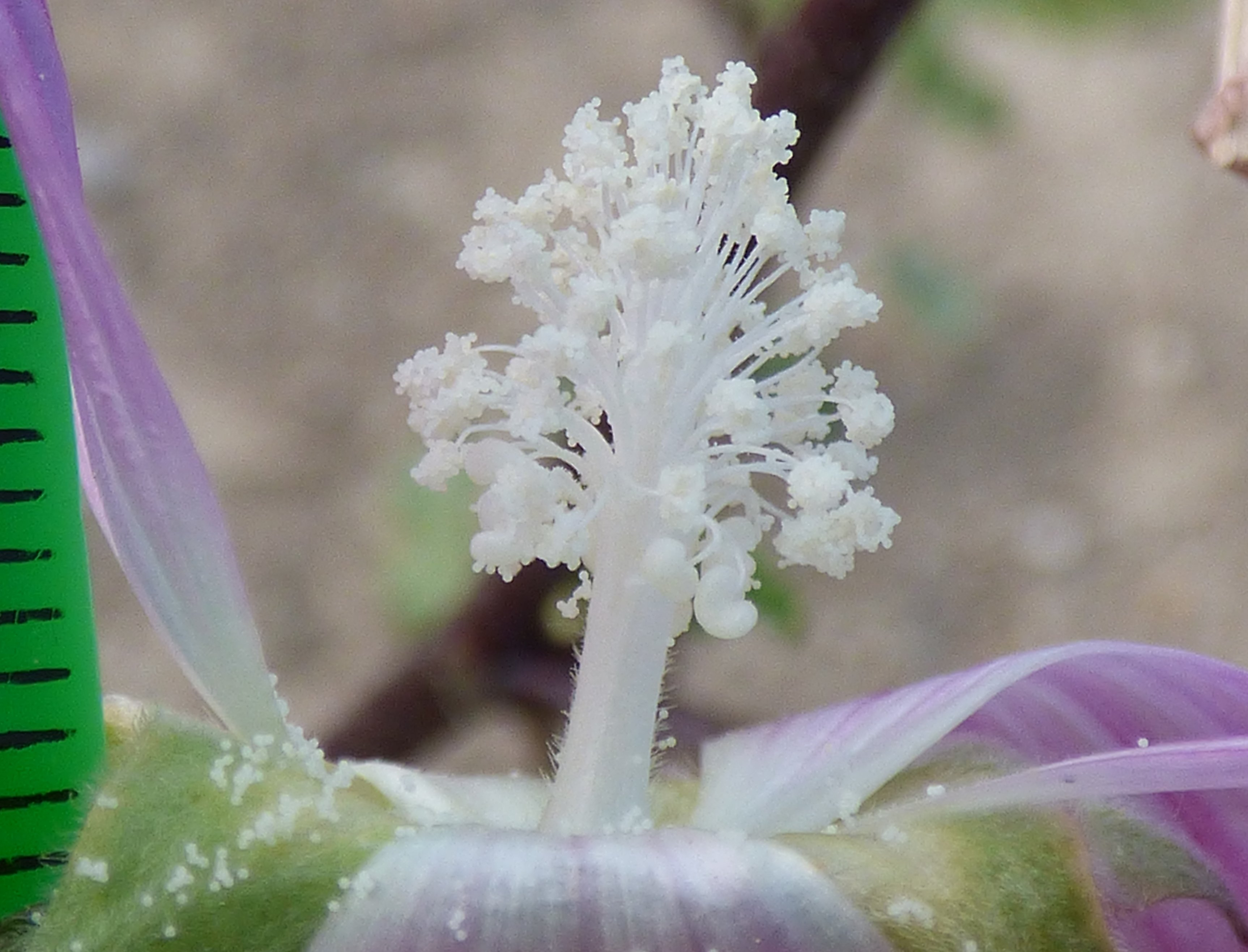
Floral organs

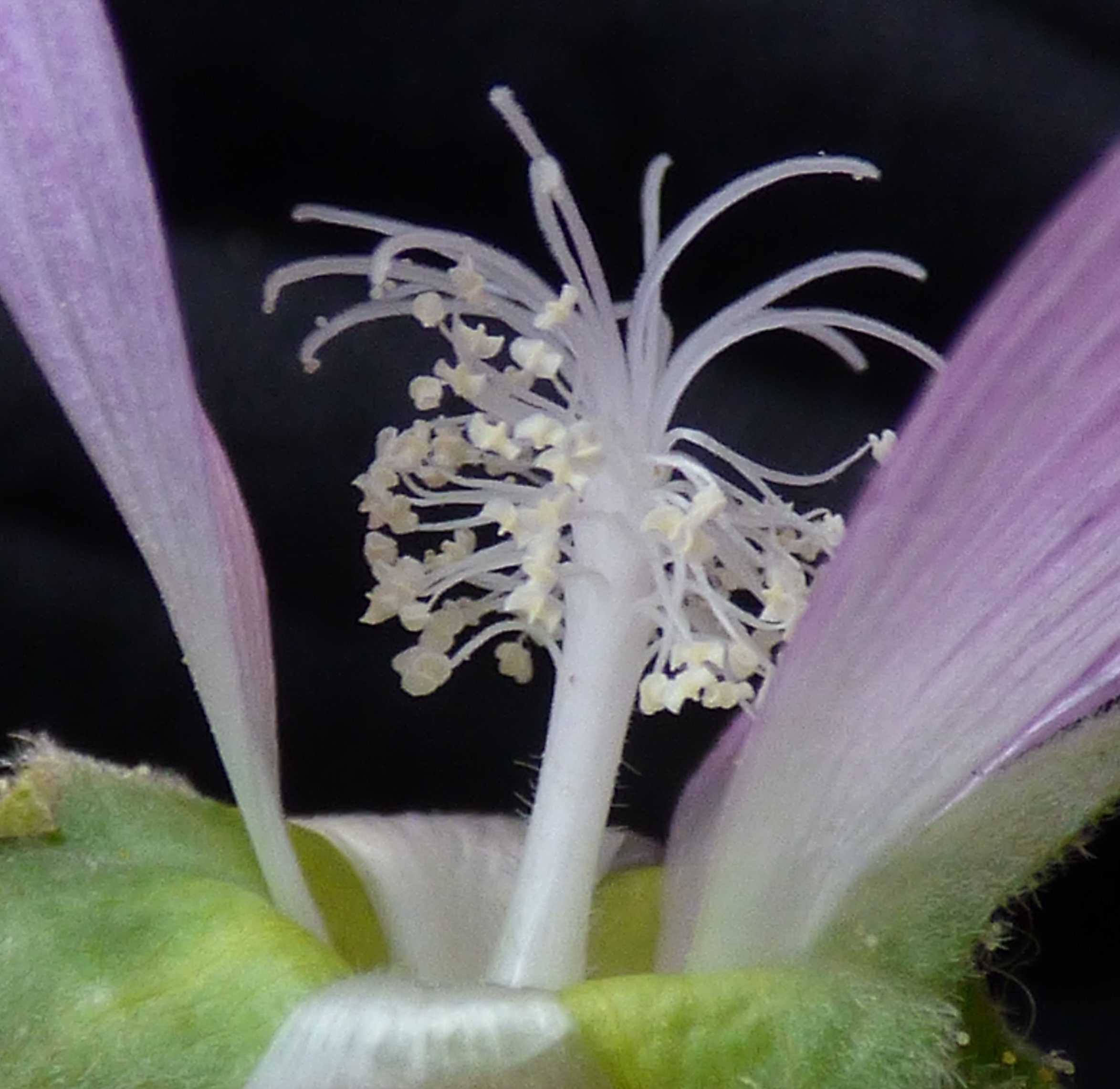
Floral organs

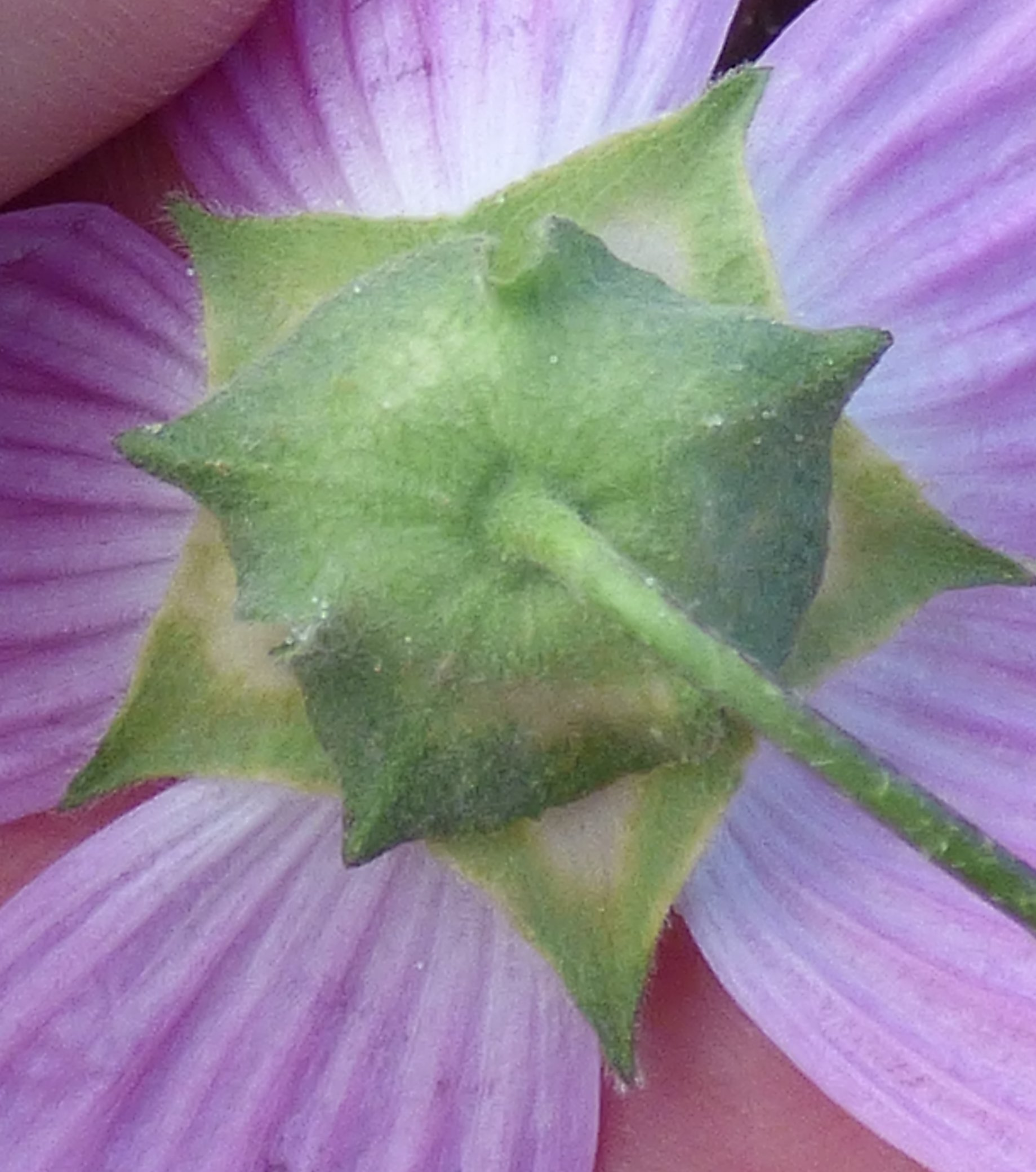
Underside showing 5-part calyx and 3-broad-part epicalyx

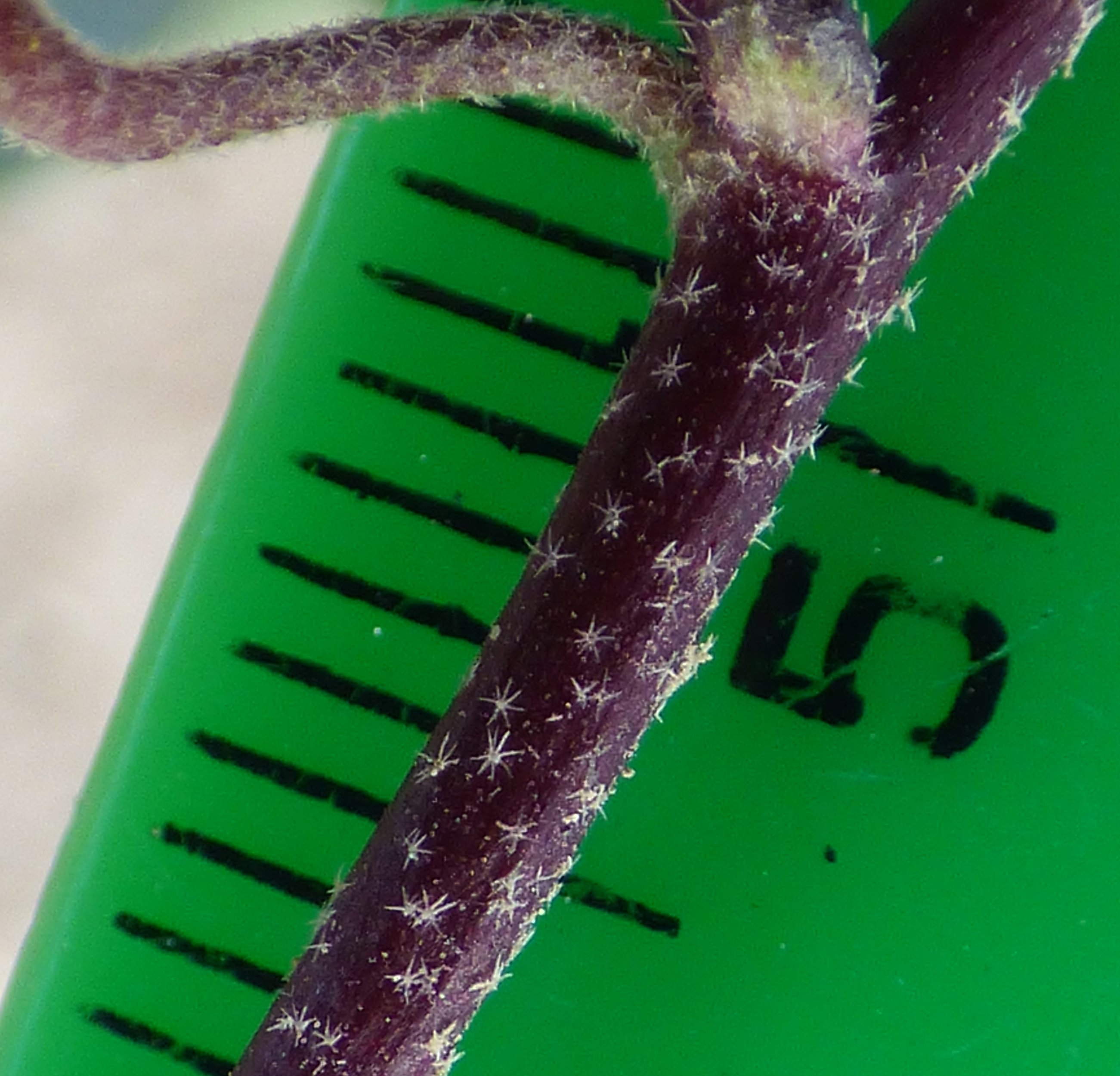
Stems stellate-haired

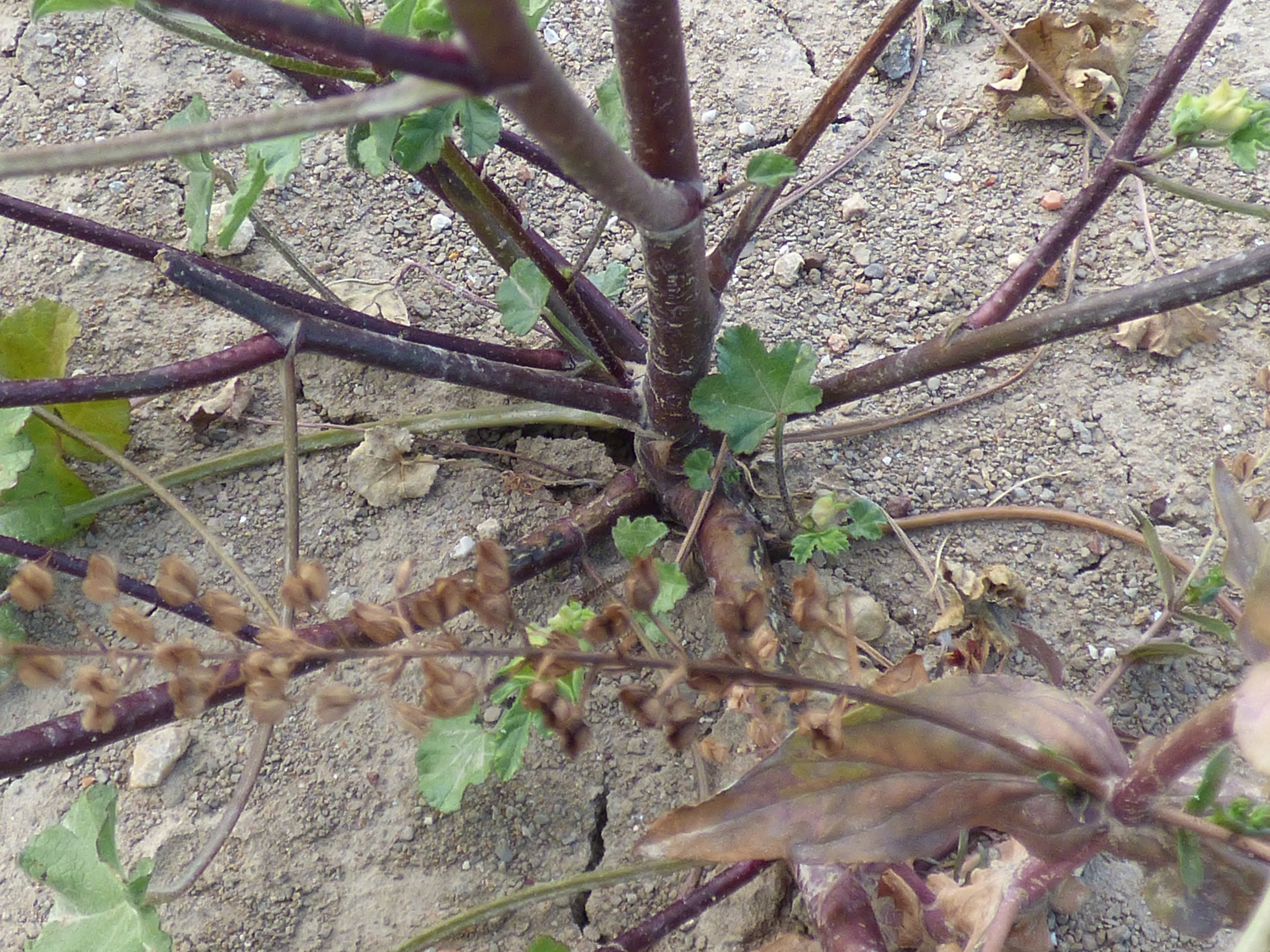
Annual plant base

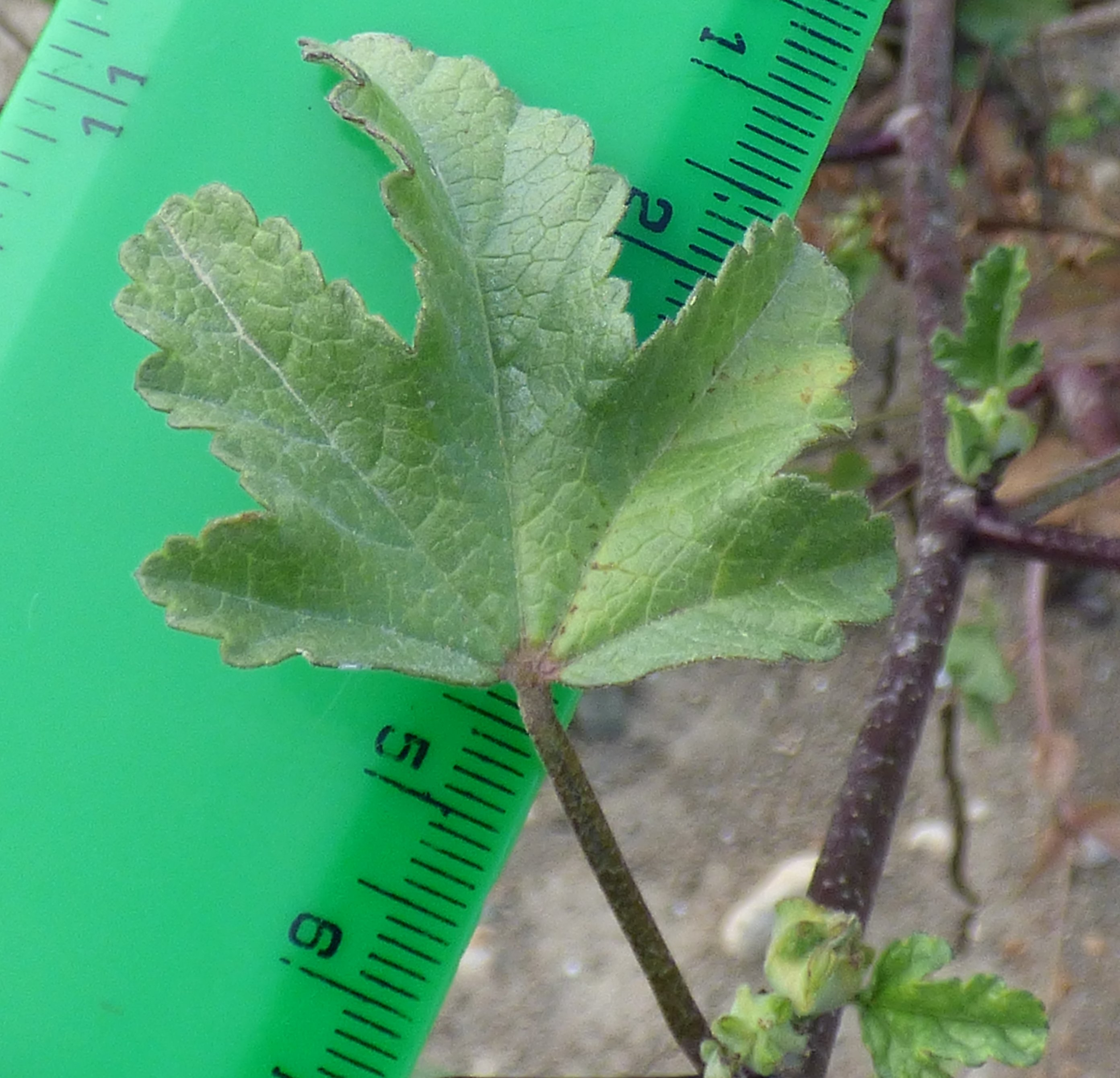
Leaf upperside

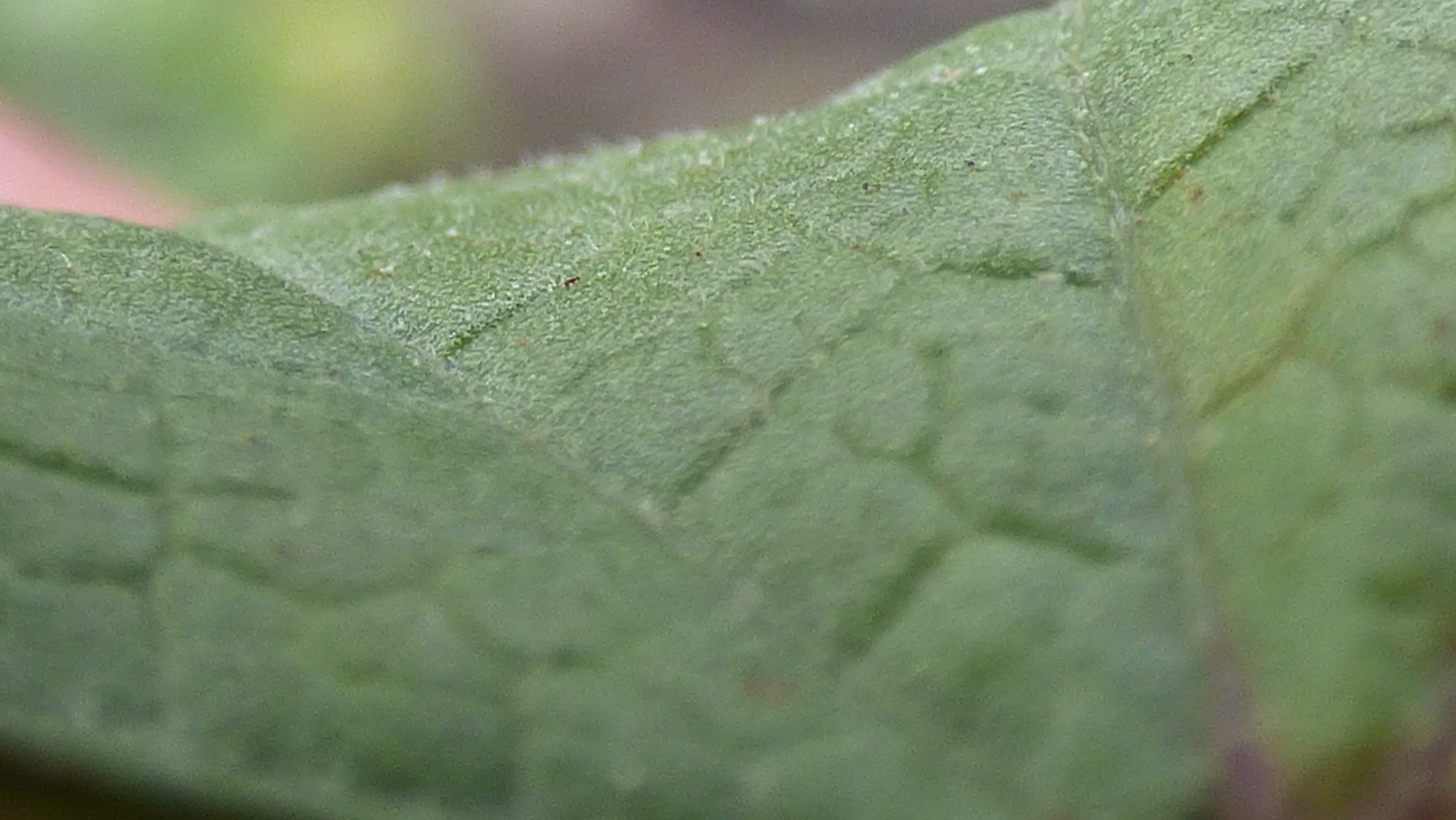
Leaf upperside

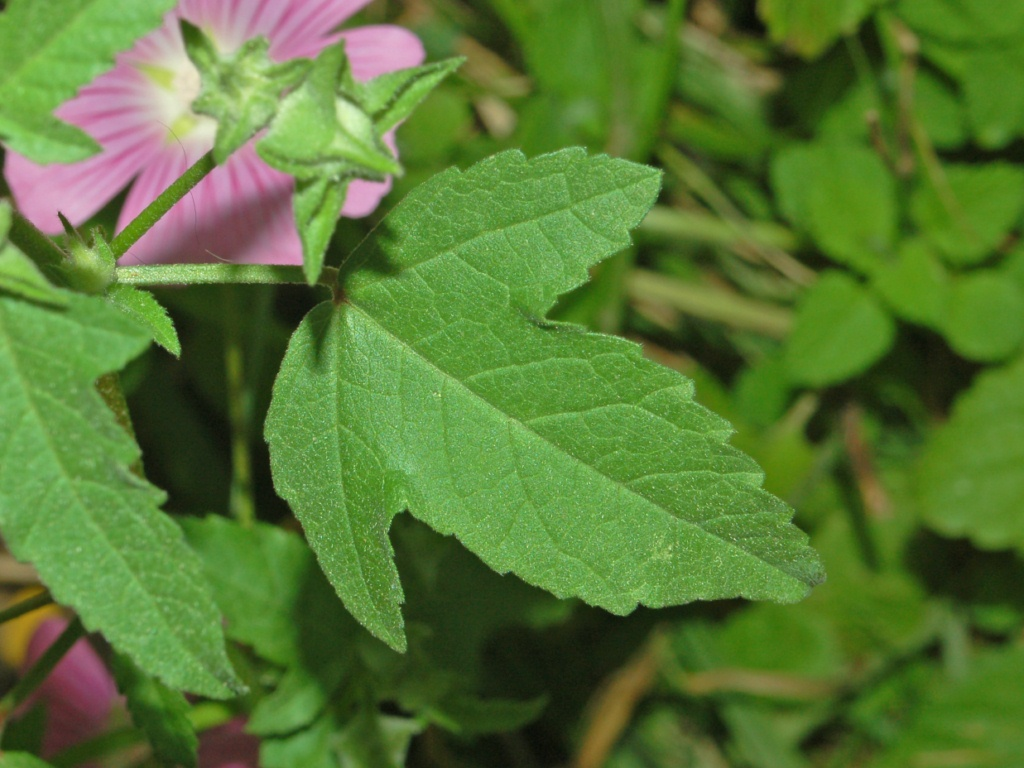
Leaf Upperside (Italy)

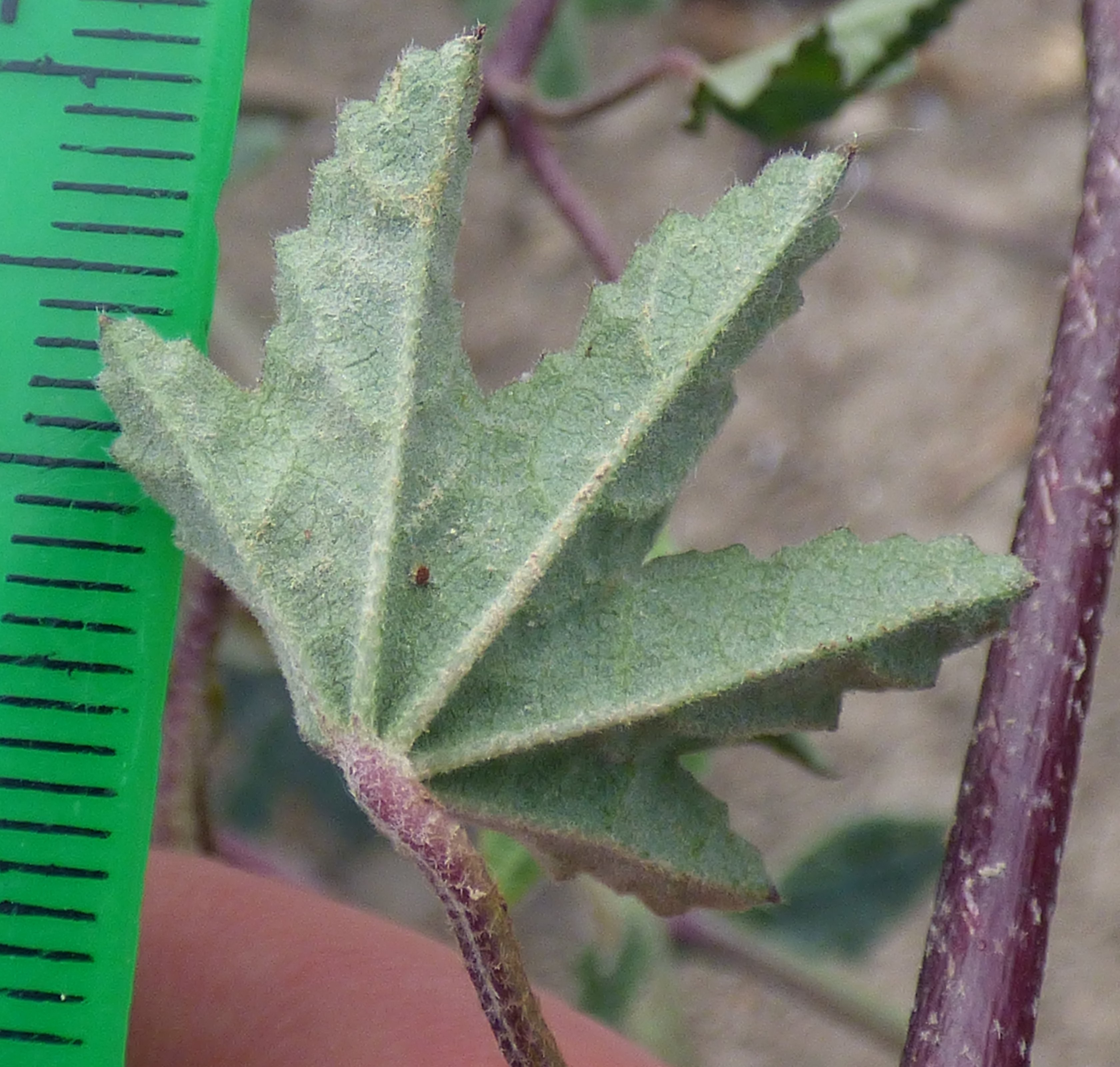
Leaf underside

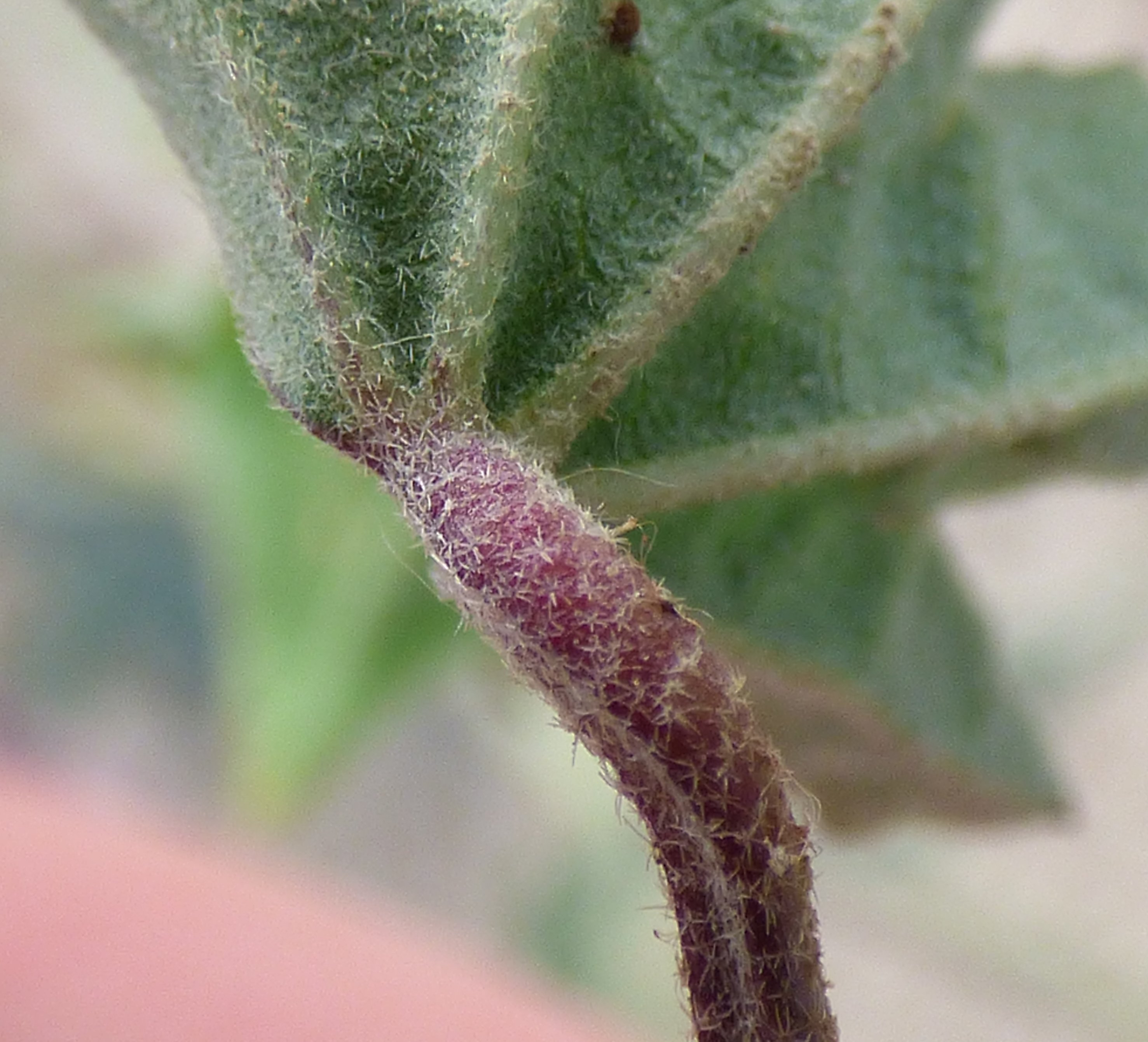
Leaf underside (may be less hairy)
