= Diphilus (physician) =

Ancient Greek physician

Diphilus (Greek: Δίφιλος) of Siphnus was an ancient Greek physician. He was a contemporary of Lysimachus, king of Thrace, about the beginning of the 3rd century BC. He wrote a work entitled, On Diet fit for Persons in good and bad Health, which is frequently quoted by Athenaeus, but of which nothing remains but the short fragments preserved by him.
