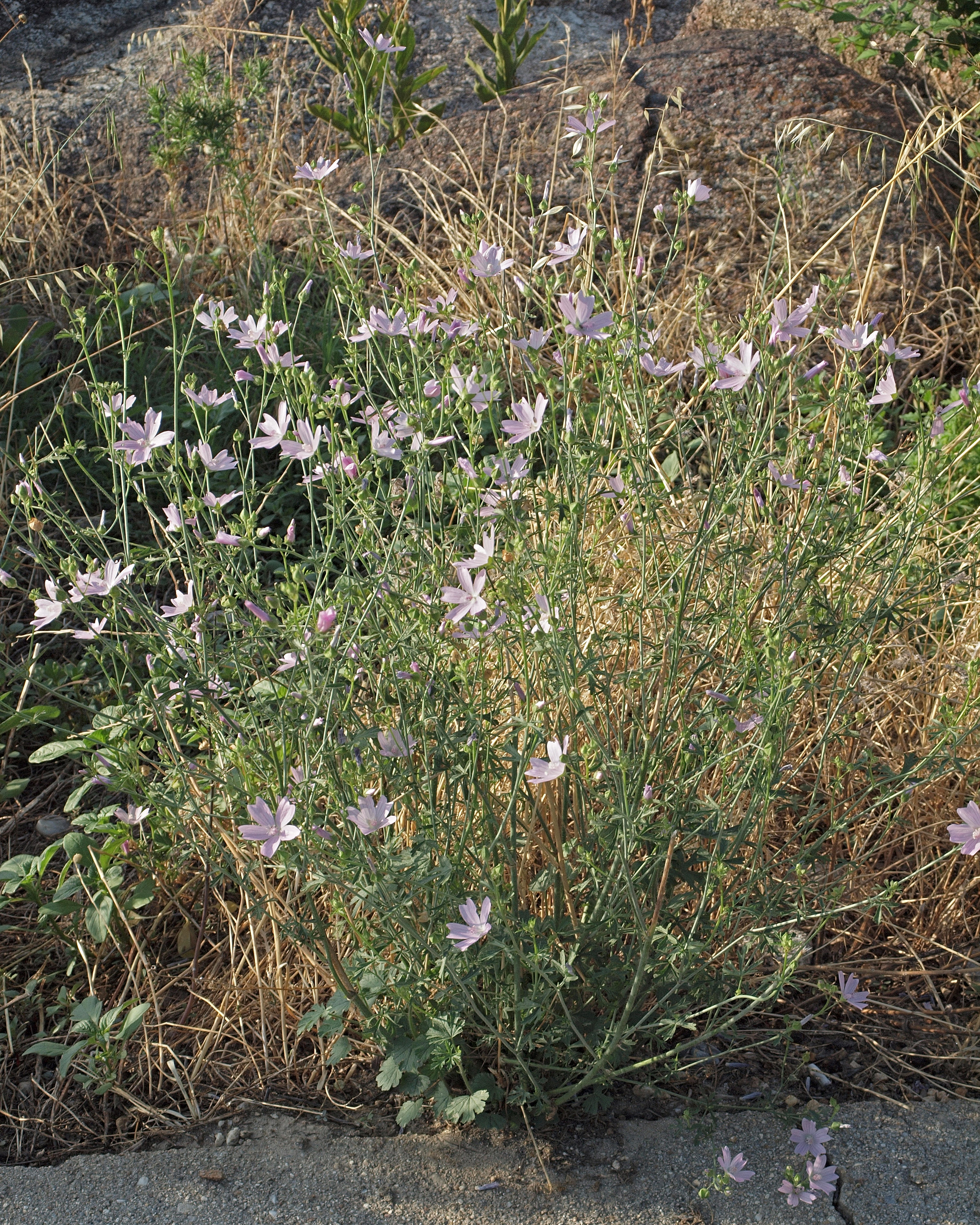
- Habit

Scientific classification
- Kingdom: Plantae
- Clade: Tracheophytes
- Clade: Angiosperms
- Clade: Eudicots
- Clade: Rosids
- Order: Malvales
- Family: Malvaceae
- Genus: Malva
- Species: M. tournefortiana

Binomial name
- Malva tournefortiana L.

Synonyms
- List: Bismalva tournefortiana (L.) Fourr.; Malva colmeiroi Willk.; Malva cuneata Merino; Malva hornemannii Bubani; Malva maritima Lam.; Malva tenuifolia Desr.; Malva tournefortii Timb.-Lagr.

= Malva tournefortiana =

Pyrenees Mallow

Species of flowering plant

Malva tournefortiana, the pyrenees mallow, is a species of flowering plant in the family Malvaceae, native to Morocco, Portugal, Spain and France. A hexaploid, it is in section Bismalva with M. moschata and M. alcea.
