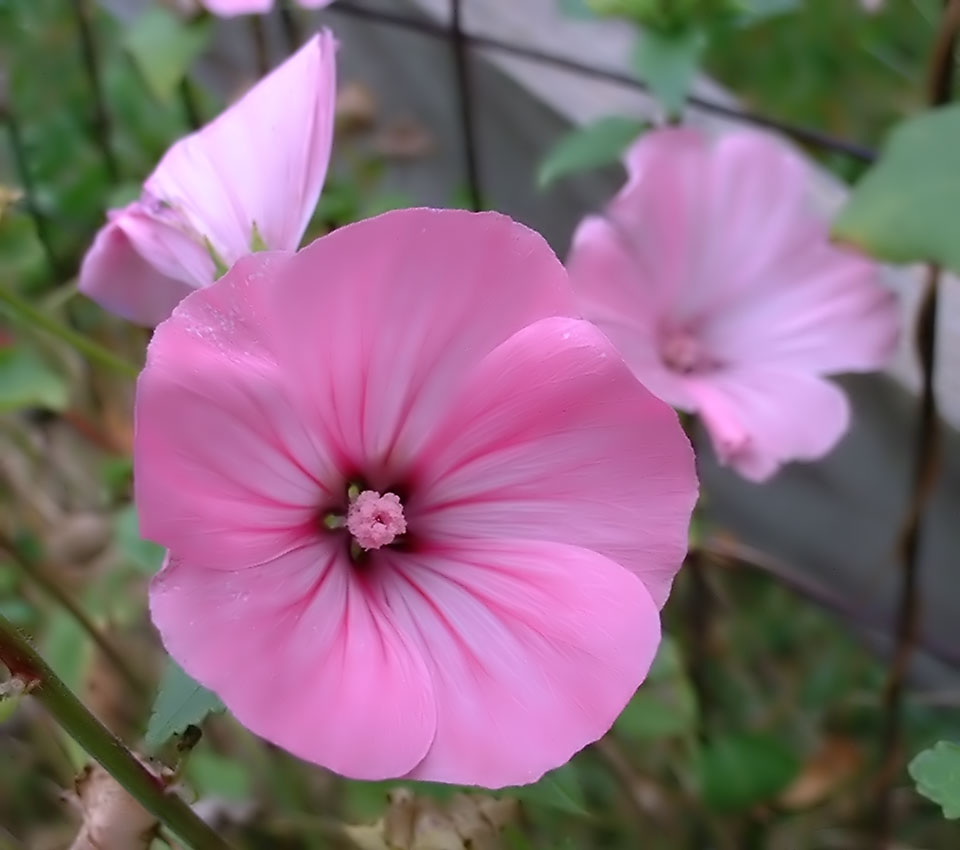

Scientific classification
- Kingdom: Plantae
- Clade: Tracheophytes
- Clade: Angiosperms
- Clade: Eudicots
- Clade: Rosids
- Order: Malvales
- Family: Malvaceae
- Genus: Malva
- Species: M. trimestris

Binomial name
- Malva trimestris L.

= Malva trimestris =

Annual mallow

Species of plant

Malva trimestris (synonyms Althaea trimestris, Lavatera trimestris), common names annual mallow, rose mallow, royal mallow, regal mallow, and common annual tree mallow is a species of flowering plant native to the Mediterranean region.

It is an annual growing to 120 cm (47 in) tall by 45 cm (18 in) wide, producing shallow funnel-shaped flowers in summer, in shades of white and pink, with maroon centres and maroon veining on the petals. The Latin trimestris literally means "of three months", referring to the growing and flowering period.

This plant is widely cultivated, often under the name Lavatera trimestris. Numerous cultivars have been developed for garden use, all of which are annuals to be sown in spring for flowering the same year. The cultivars 'Beauty Series' and 'Silver Cup' have gained the Royal Horticultural Society's Award of Garden Merit.
