= Great Famine of 1695–1697 =

Famine in Northern Europe (1695–1697)

The Great Famine of 1695–1697, or simply the Great Famine, was a catastrophic famine that affected the present-day Finland and Estonia (1695–1697), Latvia, Norway (in 1696) and Sweden (1696–1698), all of which then belonged to the Kingdom of Sweden with the exception of Norway. The areas worst affected were Finland and Norrland in Sweden proper.

The Great Famine of 1695–1697 was concurrent with the "Seven Ill Years", a period of national famine in Scotland in the 1690s.

== Finland ==
In Finland, then part of Sweden, the Great Famine of 1695–97 was also referred to as "The Years of Many Deaths" (Suuret kuolonvuodet) by some Finnish historians, because it killed about a third of the Finnish population in only two years, or about 150,000 out of 500,000. People widely relied on eating bark bread. It was Finland's worst demographic catastrophe.

The summer of 1695 was particularly cold, and grains grew abnormally slowly. Rye was reported to grow as late as August 6, and early frost destroyed the little that had grown. January and February 1696 were exceptionally warm, and the sowing was started as early as mid-February, but the frost that came in March destroyed what had already been sown. The abundant snow caused massive floods in the Spring, which delayed the harvest again.

People resorted to begging on the streets for food, and even cannibalism was reported at least once. The consumption of famine foods appears to have caused death by diarrhea in 1696.

Mortality peaked in the spring and summer of 1697, with the spread of dysentery, typhus and typhoid.

== Sweden ==
From 1688 onward, Sweden had been affected by early frost and bad harvests. This culminated in the winter of 1695, which was described as the coldest since 1658 and the rye did not flower before July. Because of this, the Great Famine of 1695 is also referred to as Det stora svartåret ("The Great Black Year"). The harvest of 1696, furthermore, was reportedly so bad that each farm produced only one loaf of rye bread.

Outside of Finland, the northernmost provinces of Sweden were the most severely affected. Desperate famine victims from the countryside left for the cities in search for food, especially to the capital of Stockholm, where in the spring of 1697 the streets were reportedly strewn with corpses and people dying of starvation.

During 1696–1698, the crude death rate in northern and central Sweden was over double its normal value. In the south, the surplus from Scania's modest harvest was sent to adjacent counties; in addition, several hundred thousand barrels of grain were imported from the Baltics.

Israel Kolmodin wrote the psalm Den blomstertid nu kommer in 1695 in connection to the famine, intended as a prayer to God that the next summer would bring food.

== Norway ==
Following a year with epidemic-related mortality and a failed September harvest (due to cold) in 1695, the famine hit major parts of Norway in the winter and spring of 1696.

== Causes ==
The 1690s marked the lowest point of the Little Ice Age, of colder and wetter weather. This reduced the elevation at which crops could be grown and shortened the growing season by up to two months in extreme years, as it did in the 1690s. The massive eruptions of volcanoes at Hekla in Iceland (1693) and Serua (1693) and Aboina (1694) in Indonesia may also have polluted the atmosphere and filtered out significant amounts of sunlight.

== See also ==
- Little Ice Age
- Great Northern War plague outbreak
- List of famines
- Finnish famine of 1866–1868
- Swedish famine of 1867–1869
- Great Famine of 1693–1694
