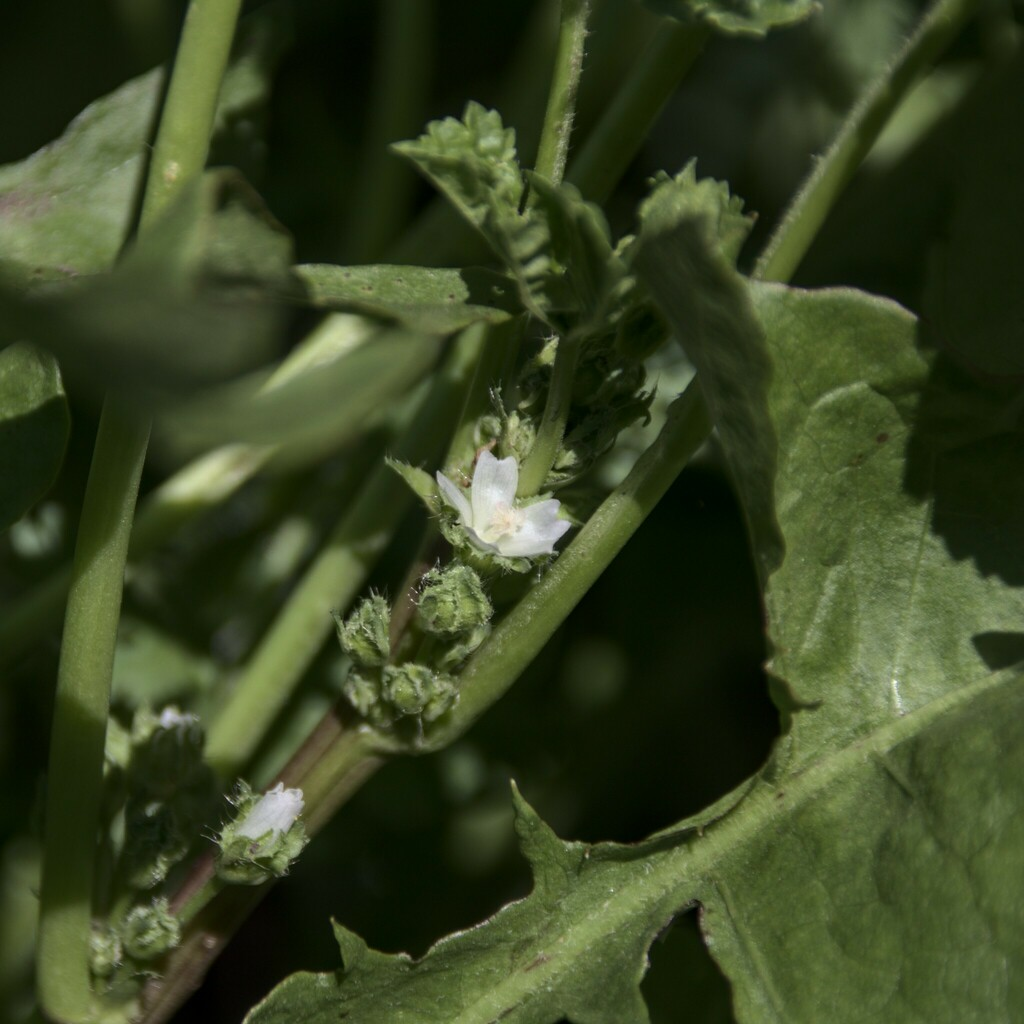
- Sverdlovsk, Russia

Scientific classification
- Kingdom: Plantae
- Clade: Tracheophytes
- Clade: Angiosperms
- Clade: Eudicots
- Clade: Rosids
- Order: Malvales
- Family: Malvaceae
- Genus: Malva
- Species: M. pusilla

Binomial name
- Malva pusilla Sm.

Synonyms
- List: Althaea borealis (Wallman) Alef.; Malva borealis Wallman; Malva bracteata Rchb.; Malva crenata Kit.; Malva henningii Goldb.; Malva humifusa J.Henning; Malva lignescens Iljin; Malva minor Garsault; Malva obtusa Torr. & A.Gray; Malva parviflora Huds.; Malva pseudoborealis Schur; Malva repens Gueldenst.; Malva rosea Roxb. ex Wight & Arn.; Malva rotundifolia L.; Malva rotundifolia var. grandior Wahlenb.; Malva rotundifolia var. henningii (Goldb.) Trevir.; Malva rotundifolia var. leiocarpa H.Lindb.; Malva rotundifolia var. pusilla (Sm.) Gray

= Malva pusilla =

Plant species in the mallow family

Malva pusilla, also known as Malva rotundifolia (the latter of which is now officially rejected by botanists), the low mallow, small mallow, or the round-leaved mallow, is an annual and biennial herb species of the Mallow genus Malva in the family of Malvaceae. Malva is a genus that consists of about 30 species of plants. This genus consists of plants named mallows. Mallows grow in many regions, including temperate, subtropical, and tropical areas.

== Distribution ==
Malva pusilla is native to temperate and Mediterranean Europe, Turkey, Caucasia, and northwest Iran. It is invasive to North America, Europe, and Korea. In the United States, in can specifically be found in the states of California, Iowa, Illinois, Indiana, Massachusetts, Maryland, Michigan, Minnesota, Missouri, North Dakota, Nebraska, New Mexico, Ohio, Oklahoma, Pennsylvania, South Dakota, Tennessee, Texas, Virginia, Wisconsin and Wyoming.

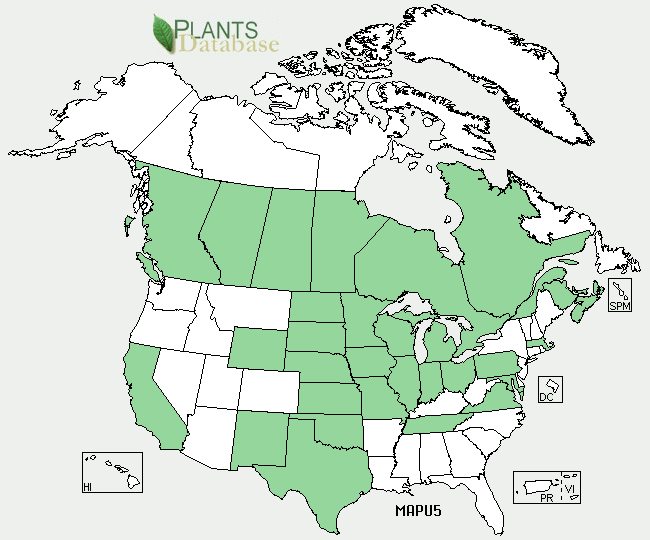
"Invasive distribution of Malva pusilla in North America"

== Habitat and ecology ==
Malva pusilla can be found widely in wastelands, grasslands, pastures, and by roadsides. It is easy to grow in ordinary garden conditions in moist, fertile soil and a sunny setting. It is prone to predation by rabbits and infestation by rust fungus.

== Invasiveness ==
Mallows can be used as garden flowers. However, some species may be considered weeds, especially in areas where they are not native. Malva pusilla grows rapidly as a weed in gardens and farmlands. It is considered hard to get rid of because of its long and tough taproots. Among cultivated crops, it can be very competitive and it can spread very quickly. Herbicide control options of this mallow are limited and not highly effective.

== Morphology ==
Malva pusilla stems can grow to a height of 4–20 inches (100–510 mm). Malva pusilla leaves are attached alternately to the stem. Leaves have orbicular shape (widely triangular) with palmate venation and serrate margins. In the past, mallows were often referred to as cheesepants because the carpel is shaped similarly to a triangular wedge of cheese.

== Flowers and seeds ==
The Malva pusilla flower consists of five petals of white, sometimes pale pink, color with pink venation. Petals and calyx are about the same length. It has many stamens and the filaments are fused. Flowering begins in June and July and ends in September and October. Flowers bloom in groups of 2 to 5 at the base of the leaf stalks. The flower's nectar is located near the upper surface of the sepals. It is self-pollinating with the aid of insects. The flowers are hermaphrodite, consisting of both female and male parts. There are usually 8 to 12 seeds per flower that are arranged in a ring. The tough seed coat enables it to remain dormant in the soil for up to 100 years. Seeds tend to germinate late in the springtime during temperatures of 15–20 °C (59–68 °F).

== Uses ==
=== Dyes ===
Dyes can be obtained from the Malva pusilla plant and seed heads, such as cream, yellow, and green. The root can also be used as a toothbrush.

=== Food ===
Some species of mallows are eaten as a leaf vegetable. The leaves and seeds of Malva pusilla are edible. They have a mild and pleasant flavor that can be used in salads. Known in Arabic as khobeza (Arabic: خُبَيْزَة khubayzah, literally 'small bread'), it serves as famine food. In April 2024, the New York Times reported that Gazans under siege were eating it to stave off starvation.

=== Medicinal ===
Malva pusilla has medicinal uses. The leaves are demulcent, which can be used as a soothing agent to relieve minor pain and membrane inflammation. They can be used to treat inflammation of the digestive and urinary systems. The seed of the Malva pusilla can be used in the treatment of coughs, bronchitis, ulcers, and hemorrhoids. It can also be applied externally to treat diseases of the skin. Although there have been no indications of dangerous toxicity, the leaves of Malva pusilla can be highly concentrated in nitrates, which can be dangerous to animals.

== Cross hybridization ==
Extensive hybridization can be done within the Mallow genus Malva. A cross between Malva pusilla and Malva neglecta is Malva ×henningii. A cross between Malva pusilla and Malva sylvestris is Malva ×littoralis.

== See also ==
Khubeza patties
