= Finnish famine of 1866–1868 =

- Country: Grand Duchy of Finland
- Period: 1866–1868
- Total deaths: 150,000
- Causes: weather (cold, rainy)

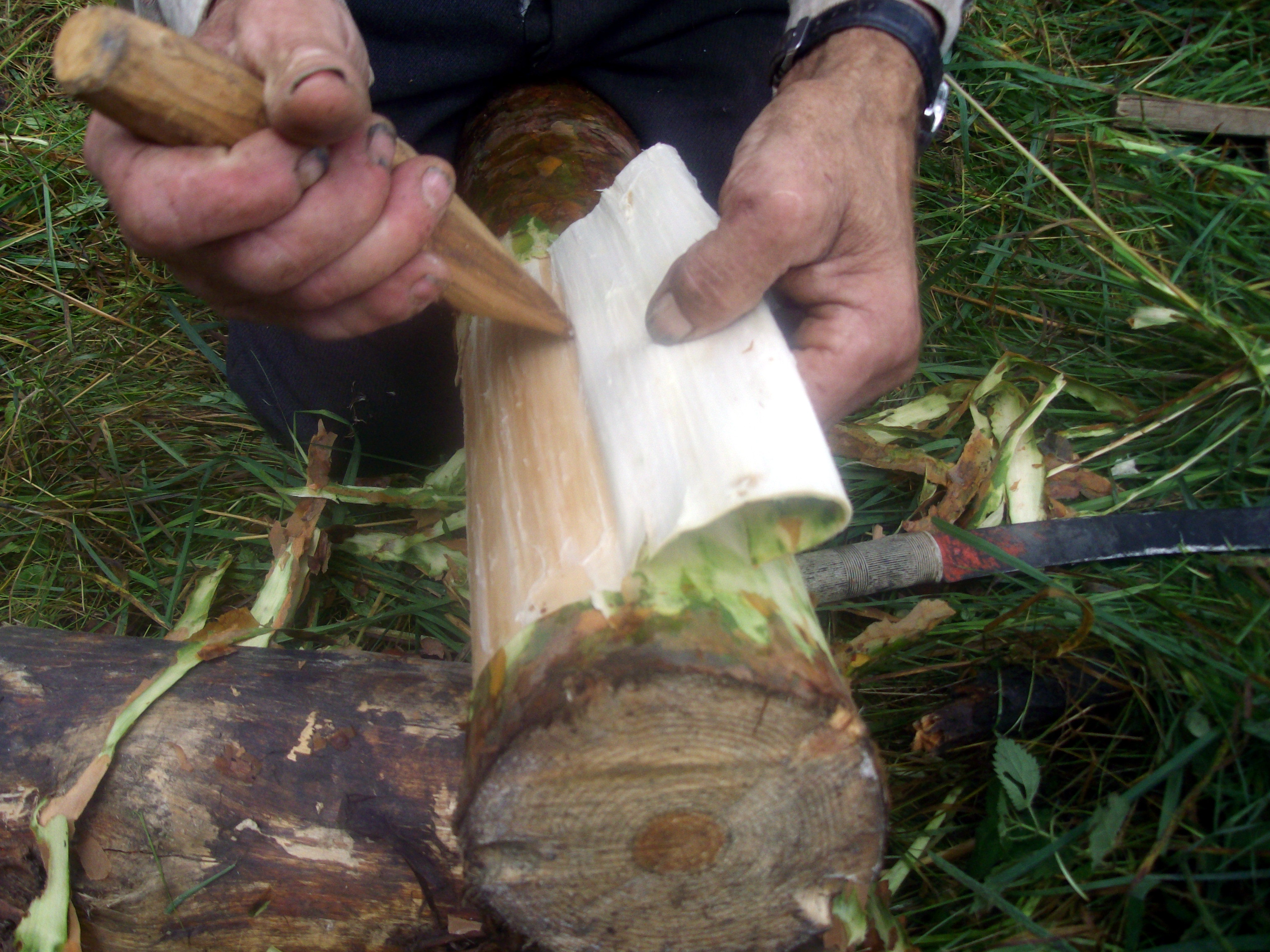
Pine bark served as famine food in Finland.

The Finnish famine of 1866–1868 was the last famine in Finland, and (along with the subsequent Swedish famine of 1867–1869) the last major famine in Northern Europe.

In Finland, the famine is known as "the great hunger years", or suuret nälkävuodet. About 8.5% of the entire population died of hunger; in the hardest-hit areas up to 20%. The total death toll was 270,000 in three years, about 150,000 in excess of normal mortality. The worst-hit areas were Satakunta, Tavastia, Ostrobothnia, and North Karelia.

== Causes ==
Parts of the country had suffered poor harvests in previous years, most notably in 1862. The summer of 1866 was extremely rainy, and staple crops failed widely: potatoes and root vegetables rotted in the fields, and conditions for sowing grain in the autumn were unfavourable. When stored food ran out, thousands took to the roads to beg.

The following winter was hard, and spring was late. In Helsinki, the average temperature in May 1867 was +1.8 °C (35.2 °F), about 6 °C (11 °F) below the long-time average and by far the coldest May in the meteorological record of Helsinki since observations commenced in 1829. In many places, lakes and rivers remained frozen until June.

After a promisingly warm midsummer, freezing temperatures in early September ravaged crops; as a result, the harvest was about half the average. By the autumn of 1867, people were dying by the thousands.

== Disease ==
1866–68 saw what was thought of at the time as typhus killing 270,000 people in the region. Municipalities that were particularly badly hit were Eno, Ilomantsi, Pielisjärvi and Rautavaara in North Karelia, and Ostrobothnia, Satakunta and Häme.

== Actions ==
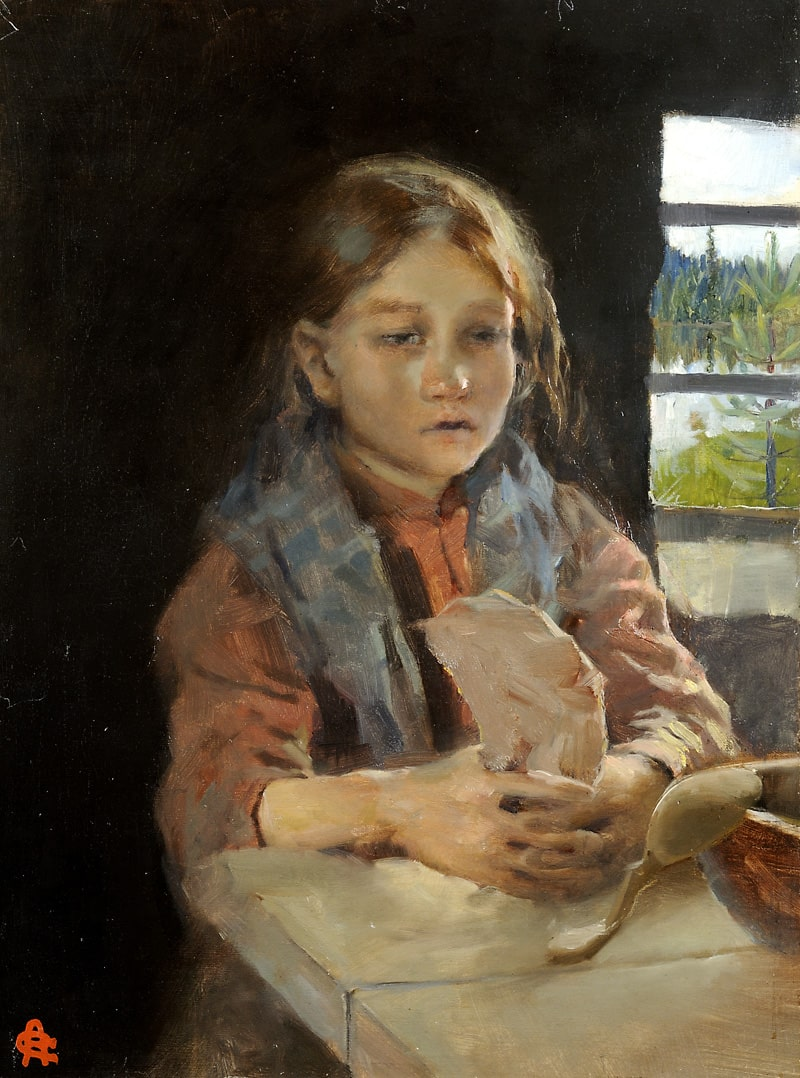
Girl Singing The Bark bread Song By Akseli Gallen Kallela

The government of the Grand Duchy of Finland was ill-equipped to handle a crisis of such magnitude. There was no money readily available to import food from largely monopolized Central European markets, and the government was slow to recognize the severity of the situation. Finance minister Johan Vilhelm Snellman, in particular, did not want to borrow, lest Finland's recently introduced currency, the Finnish markka, be weakened because of high interest rates. When money was finally borrowed from the Rothschild bank of Frankfurt in late 1867, the crisis was already full blown, and grain prices had risen in Europe. In addition, it was difficult to transport what little aid could be mustered in a country with poor communications. A number of emergency public works projects were set up, foremost among them the construction of the railway line from Riihimäki to Saint Petersburg.

== Aftermath ==
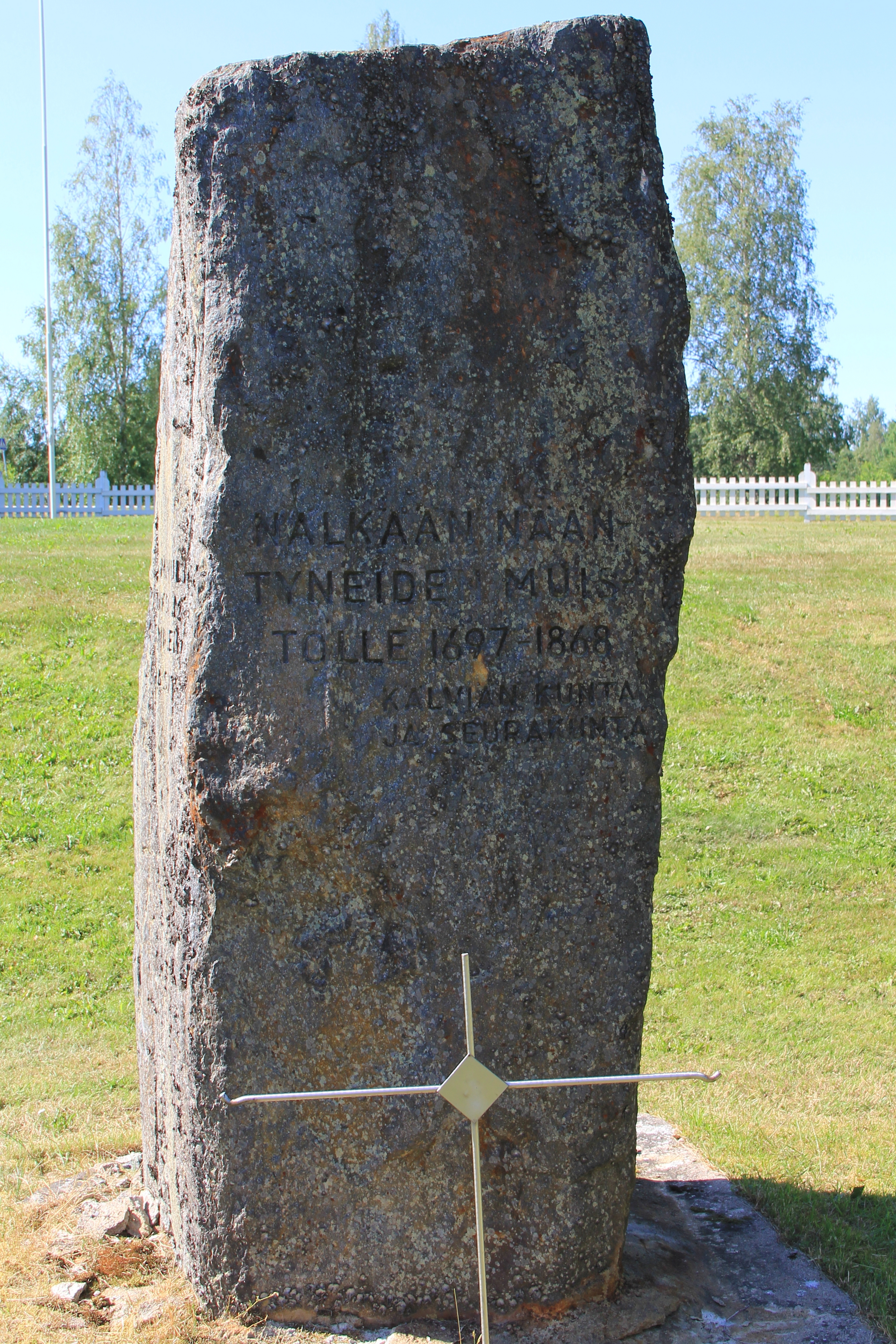
Memorial for victims of famine, Kokkola, Finland. Memorial is dedicated to victims of Great Famine of 1695–1697 and Finnish famine of 1866–1868

The weather returned to normal in 1868, and that year's harvest was somewhat better than average, yet, contagious diseases that had spread in the previous year took many additional lives.

Programs were launched to increase the diversity of Finnish agriculture, and rapidly improving communications made a recurrence of such a famine less likely.

In general, ordinary Finns at the time saw the famine as an act of God. Few would have expected the crown to be able to do much more, and blame was directed mainly at local officials. No significant working class political movement had developed yet that could have capitalized politically on the crisis. The urban population was small, and for the people of the countryside, the first priority was to resume normal lives. In short, the famine did not threaten the social order, but its memory cast a long shadow.

Because of the famine, many Finns immigrated into Murmansk.

== See also ==
- Great Famine of 1695–1697
- List of famines
- Russian famine of 1601–1603
