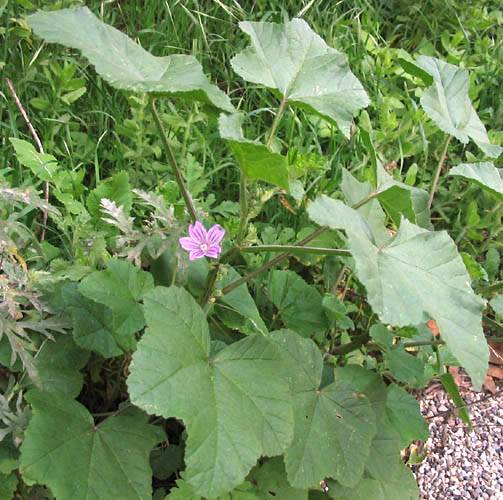

Scientific classification
- Kingdom: Plantae
- Clade: Tracheophytes
- Clade: Angiosperms
- Clade: Eudicots
- Clade: Rosids
- Order: Malvales
- Family: Malvaceae
- Genus: Malva
- Species: M. nicaeensis

Binomial name
- Malva nicaeensis All.

Synonyms
- Malva arvensis

= Malva nicaeensis =

Species of flowering plant

Malva nicaeensis is a species of flowering plant in the mallow family known by the common names bull mallow and French mallow. It grows up to 60 centimetres (24 in) tall, producing pinkish flowers. It grows in the Middle East, where it has variously served as food.

== Description ==
Malva nicaeensis is an annual or biennial herb producing a hairy, upright stem up to 60 centimetres (24 in) long. The leaves are up to 12 cm wide and have several slight lobes along the edges.

Flowers appear in the leaf axils, each with pinkish to light purple petals around 1 cm long. The disc-shaped fruit has several segments.

== Distribution and habitat ==
In the Levant, mallows grow profusely after the first winter rains.

== Uses ==
The leaves and stems are edible, and are widely collected for food, as they make an excellent garnish when chopped and fried in olive-oil with onions and spices. In Israel, the plant is renowned for having fed the besieged Jewish settlers in the 1948 Battle for Jerusalem, its use similar to spinach. A particularly famous preparation are the Khubeza patties. Apicius, a collection of Roman cookery recipes, mentions garum being used as a fish stock to flavor cooked mallows.

== Botanical gallery ==
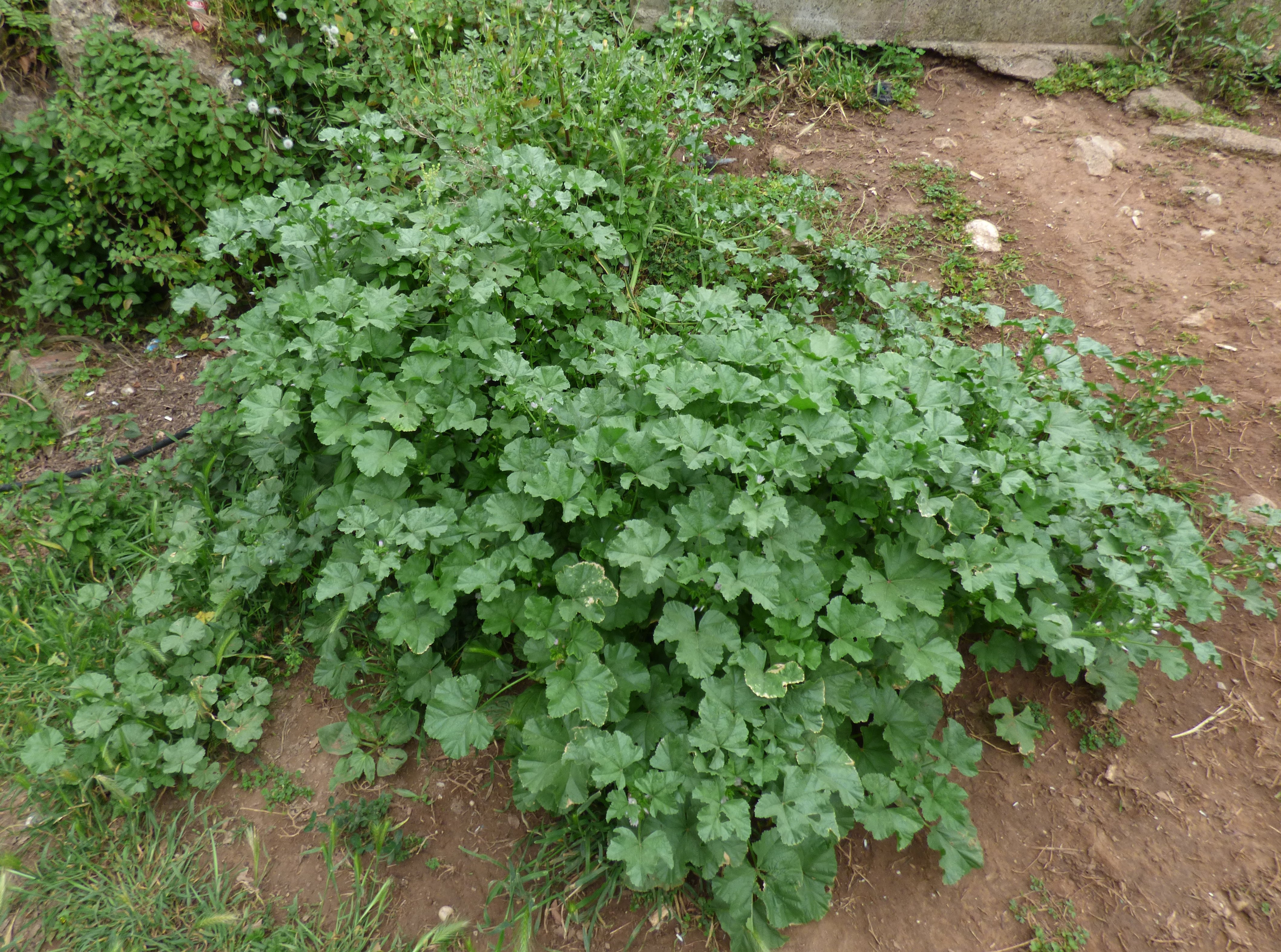
Plant form, general

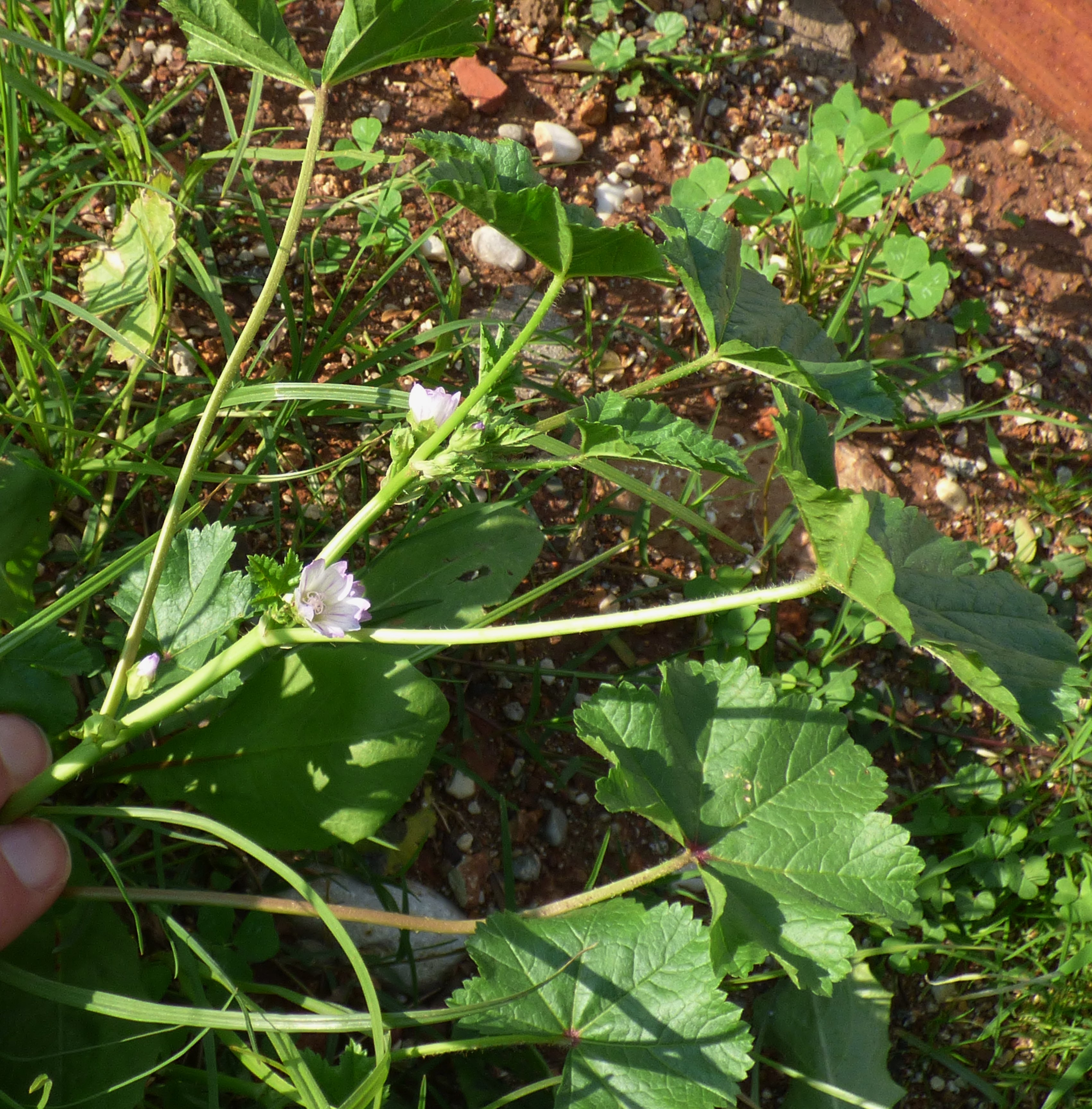
Plant form closer

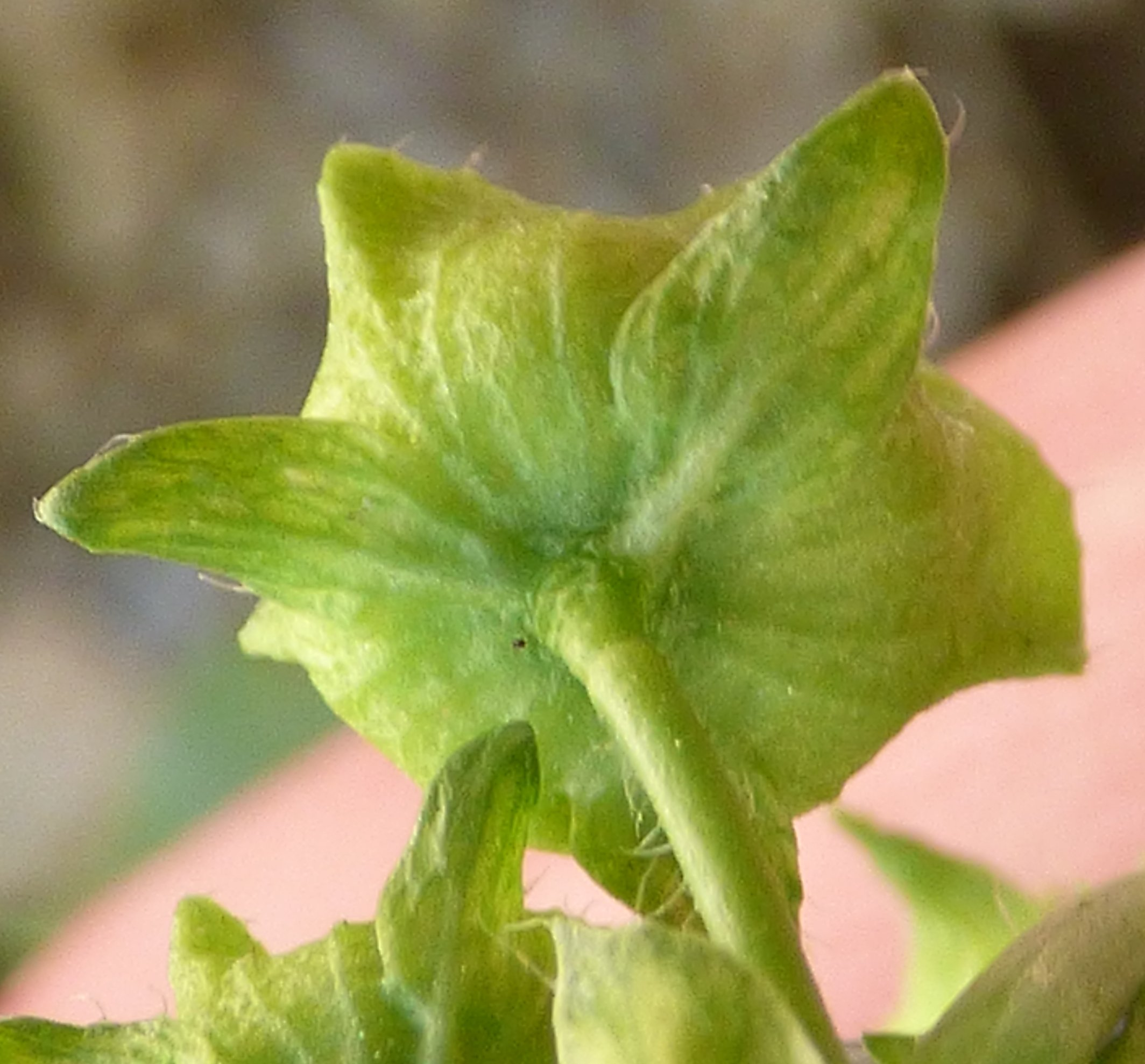
Epicalyx 3 broad segments, lacking stellate hairs

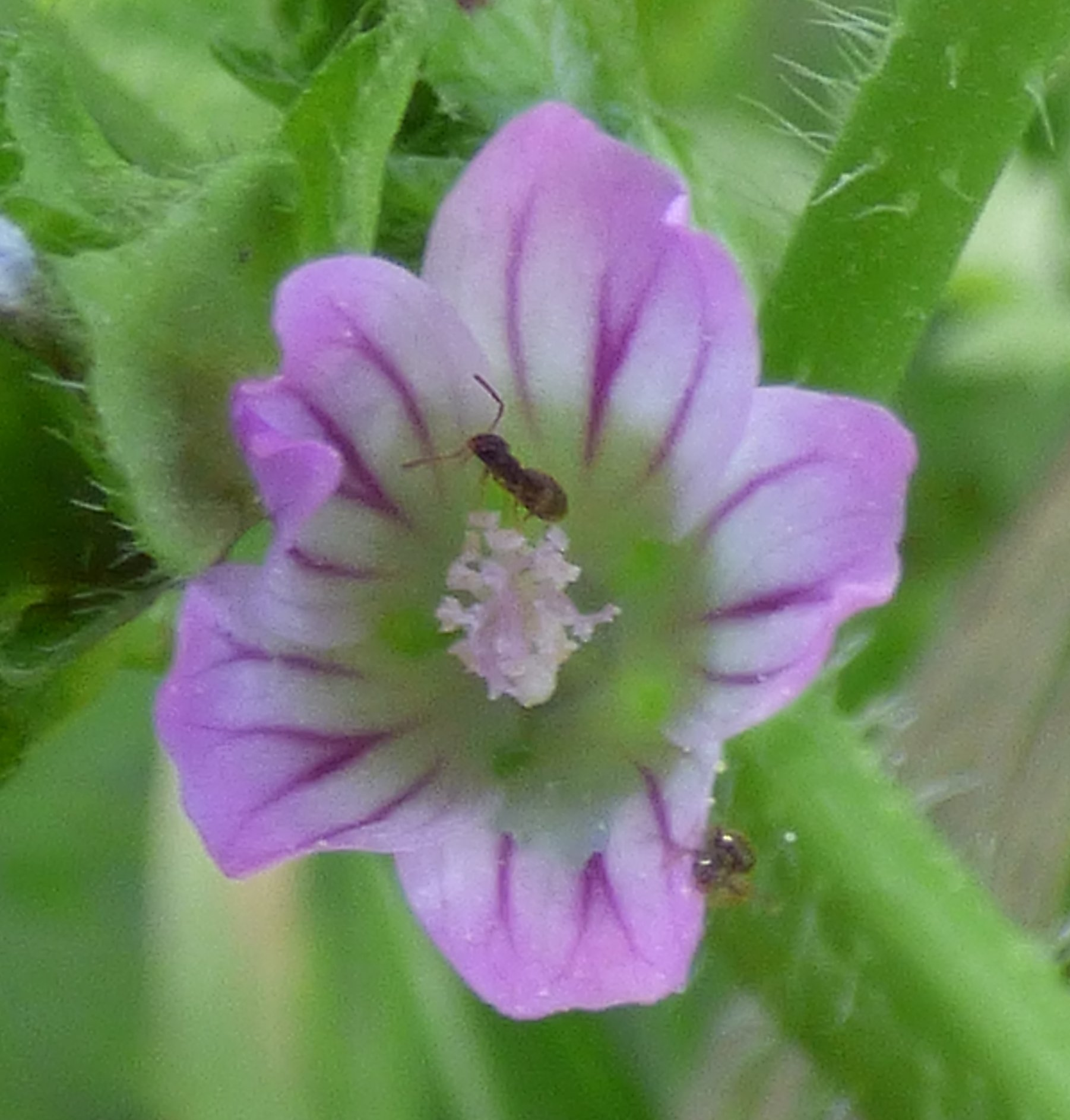
Flower, pinky with bold veins, may be paler

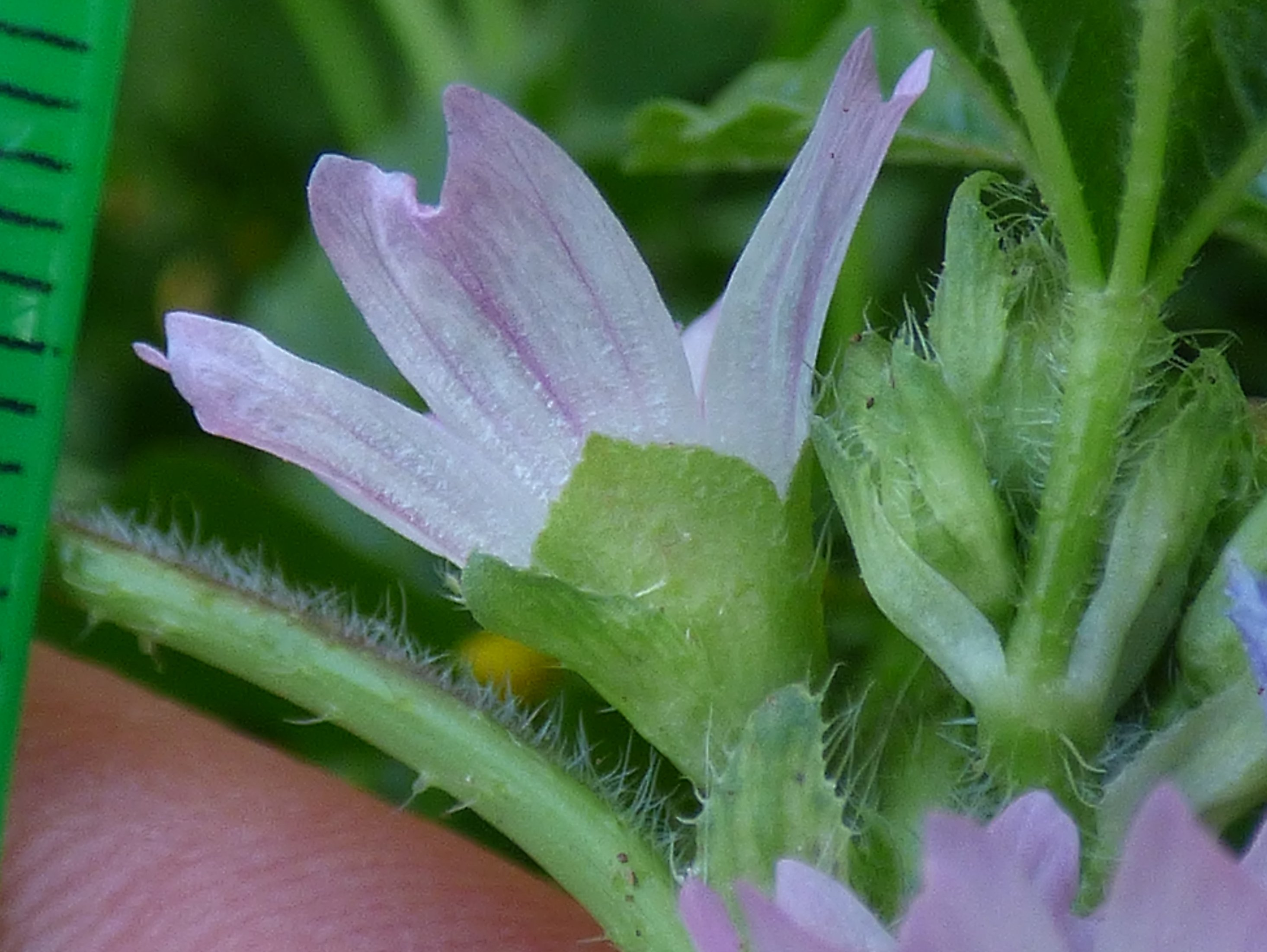
Flower showing calyx with 5 broad parts, epicalyx with 3 broad parts, sparsely hairy with simple hairs

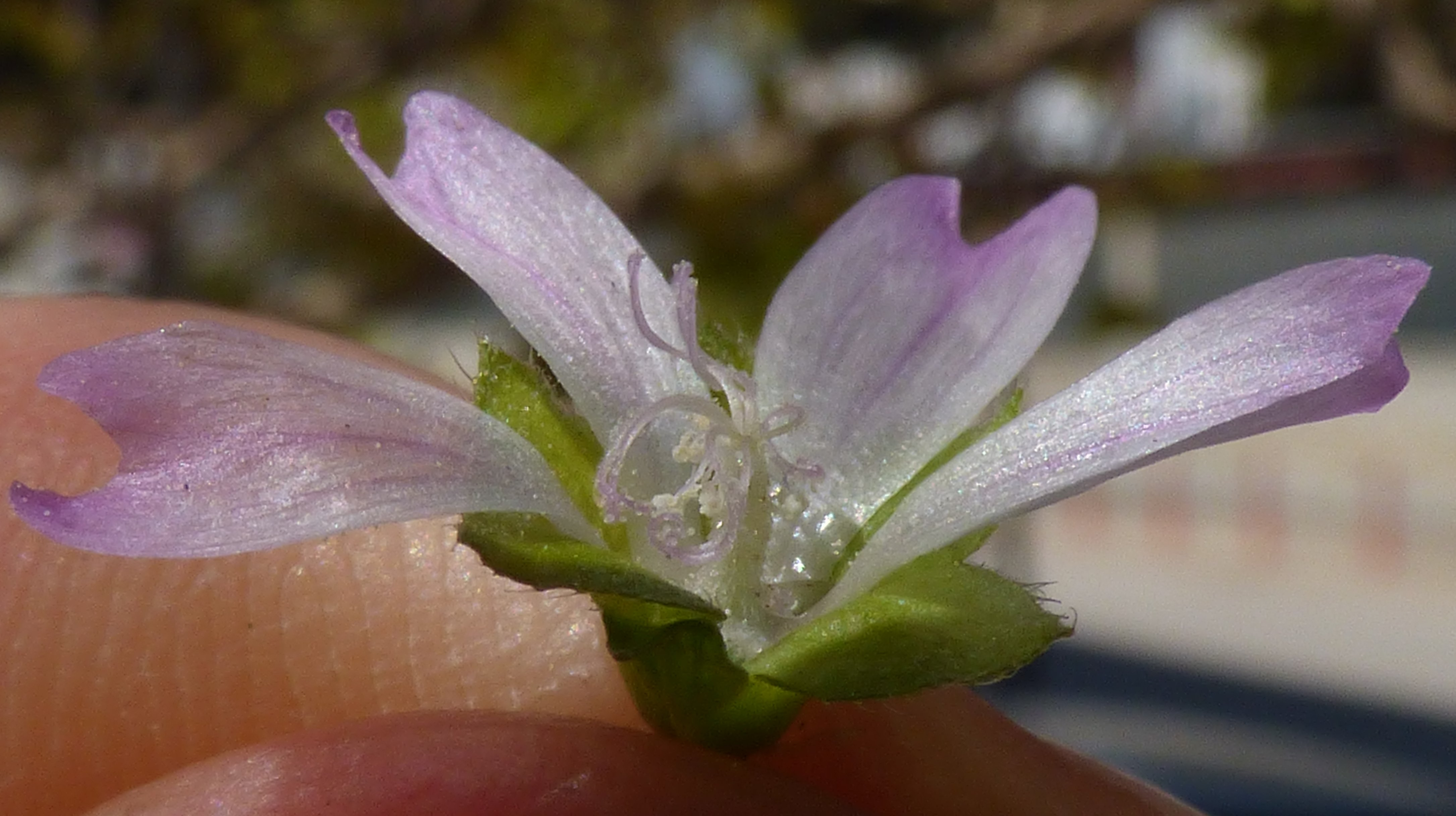
Flower, petals without hairs, or with little, at centre

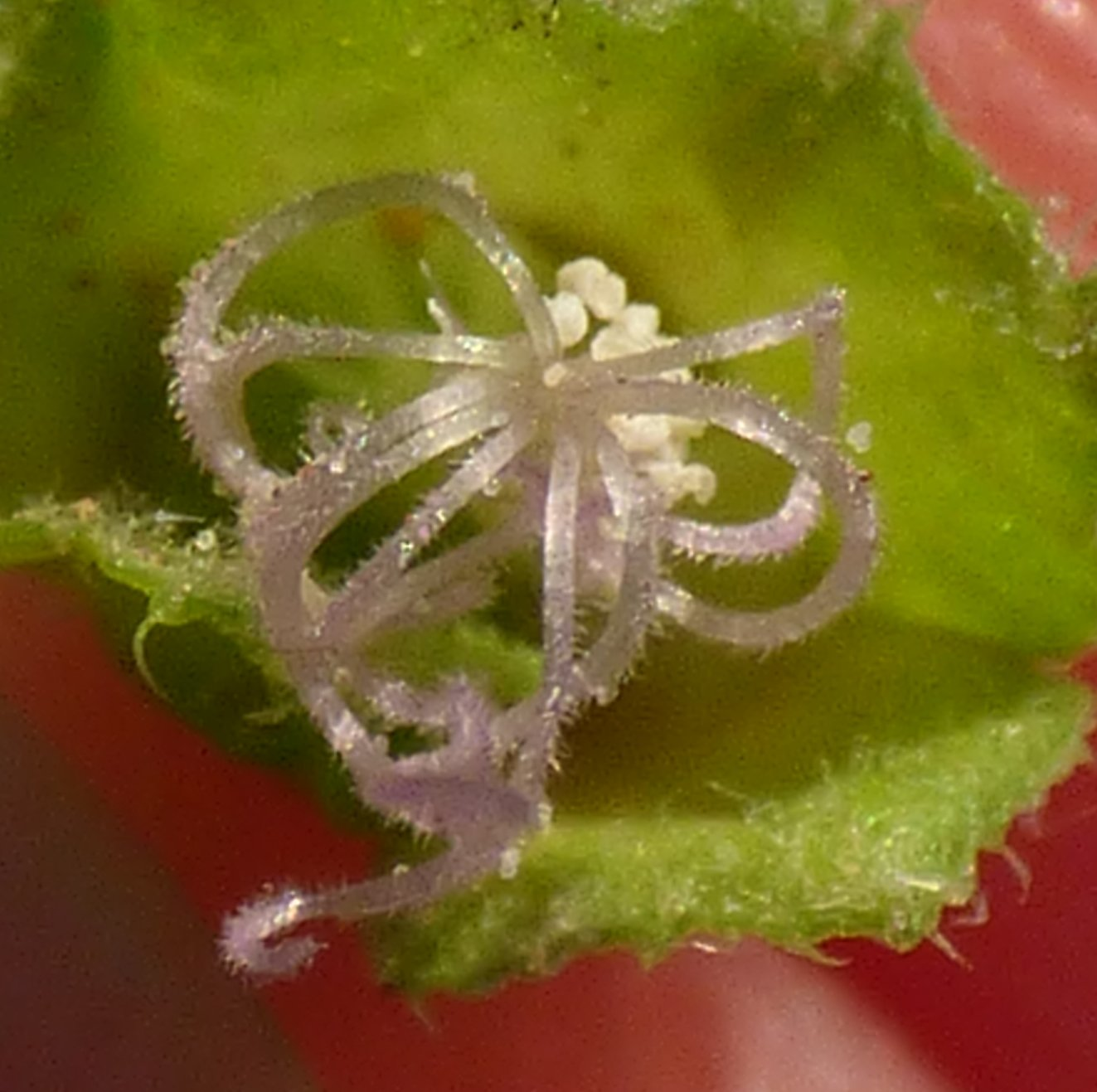
Central stigma

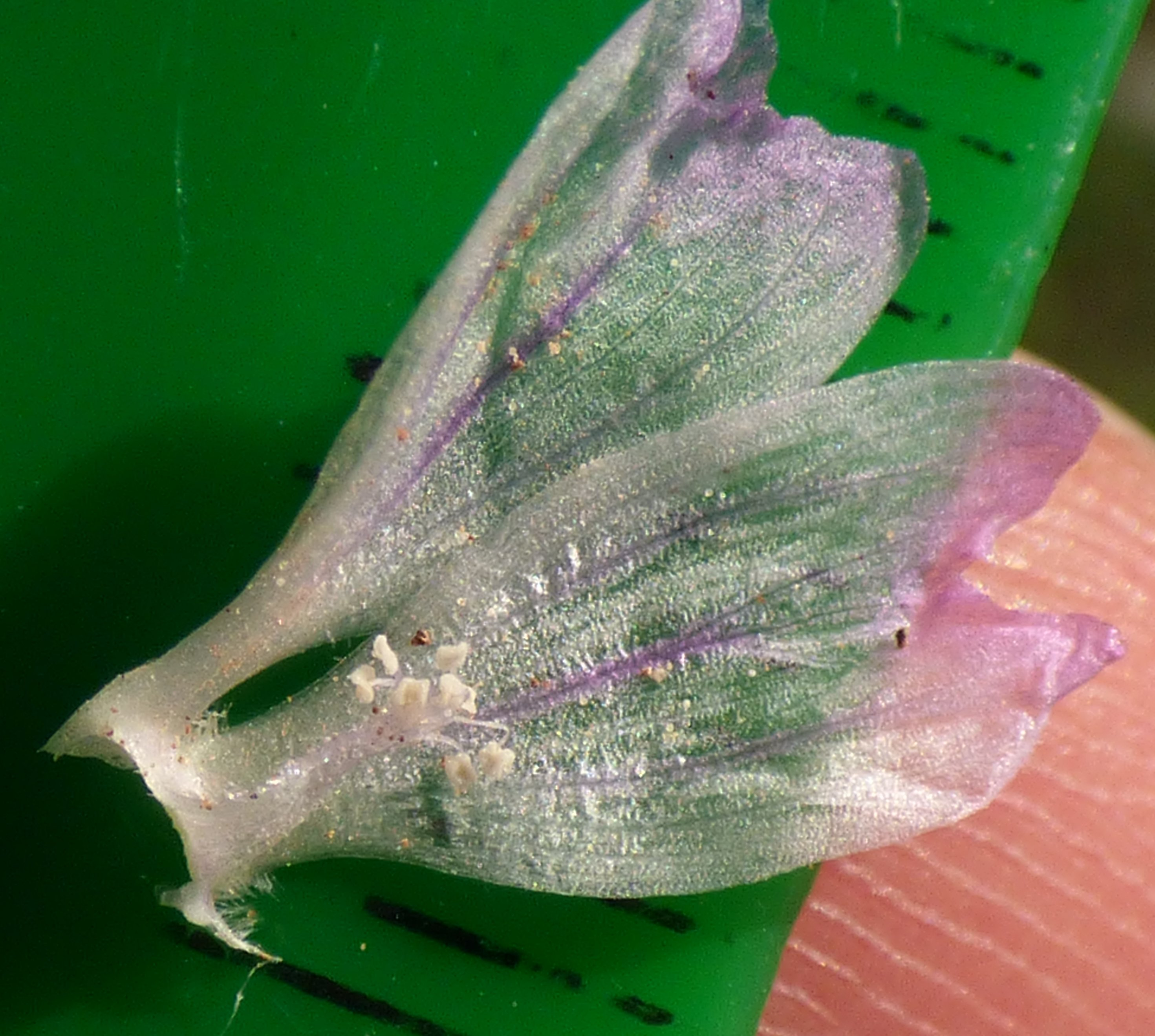
Petal, no hairs or scarcely so

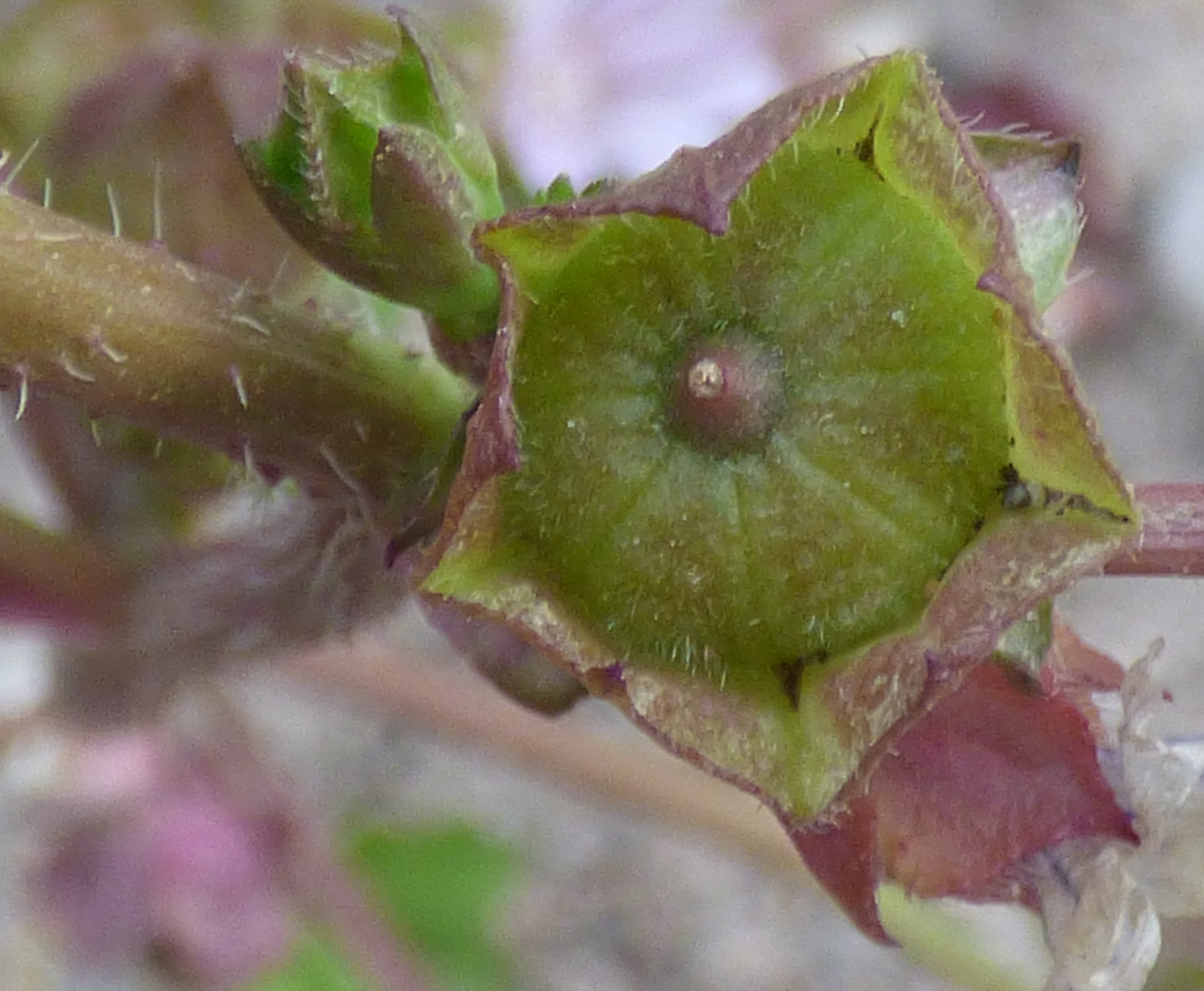
Fruit, lightly hairy (may be hairless), showing wrinkles

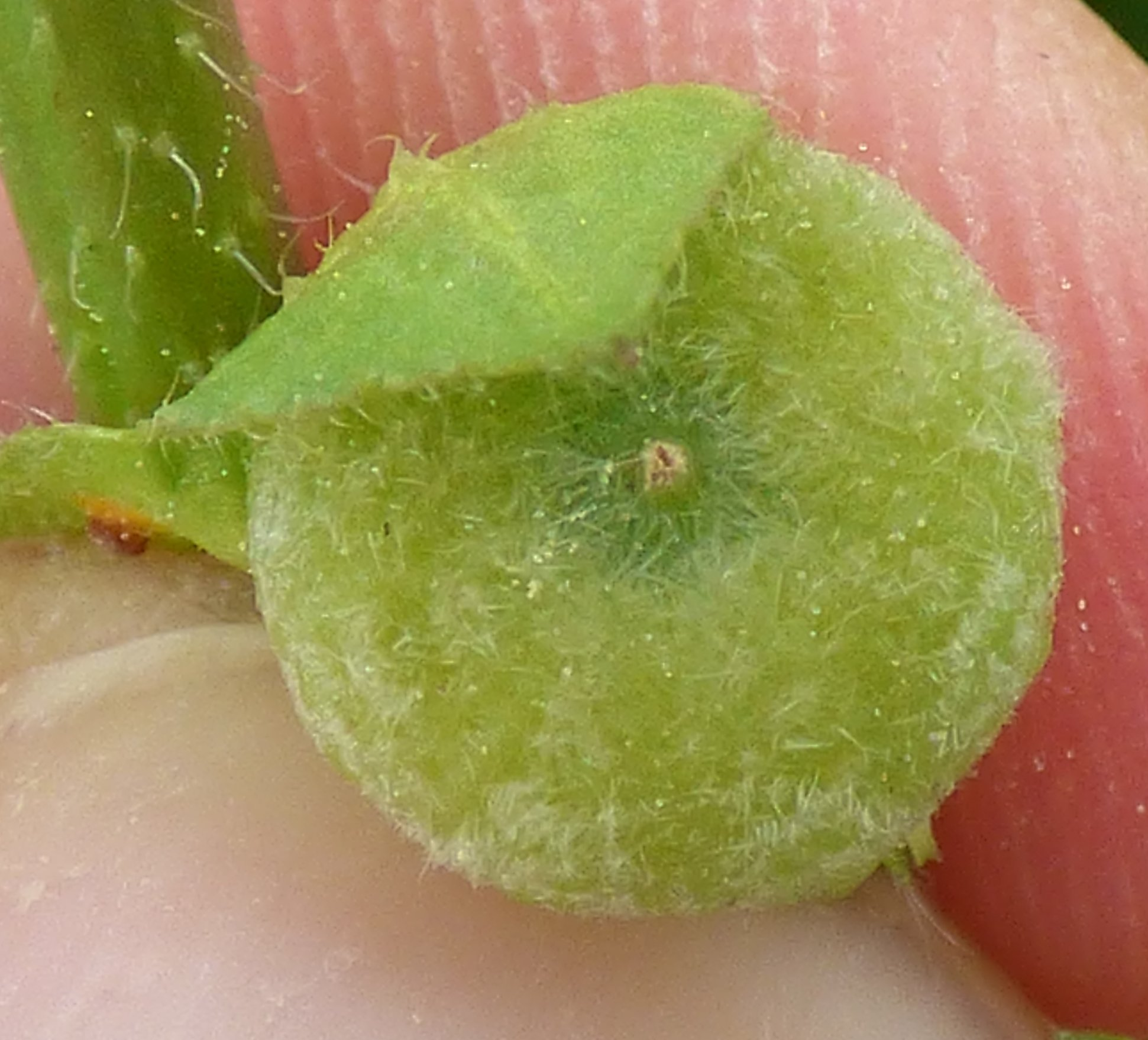
Fruit, very hairy form

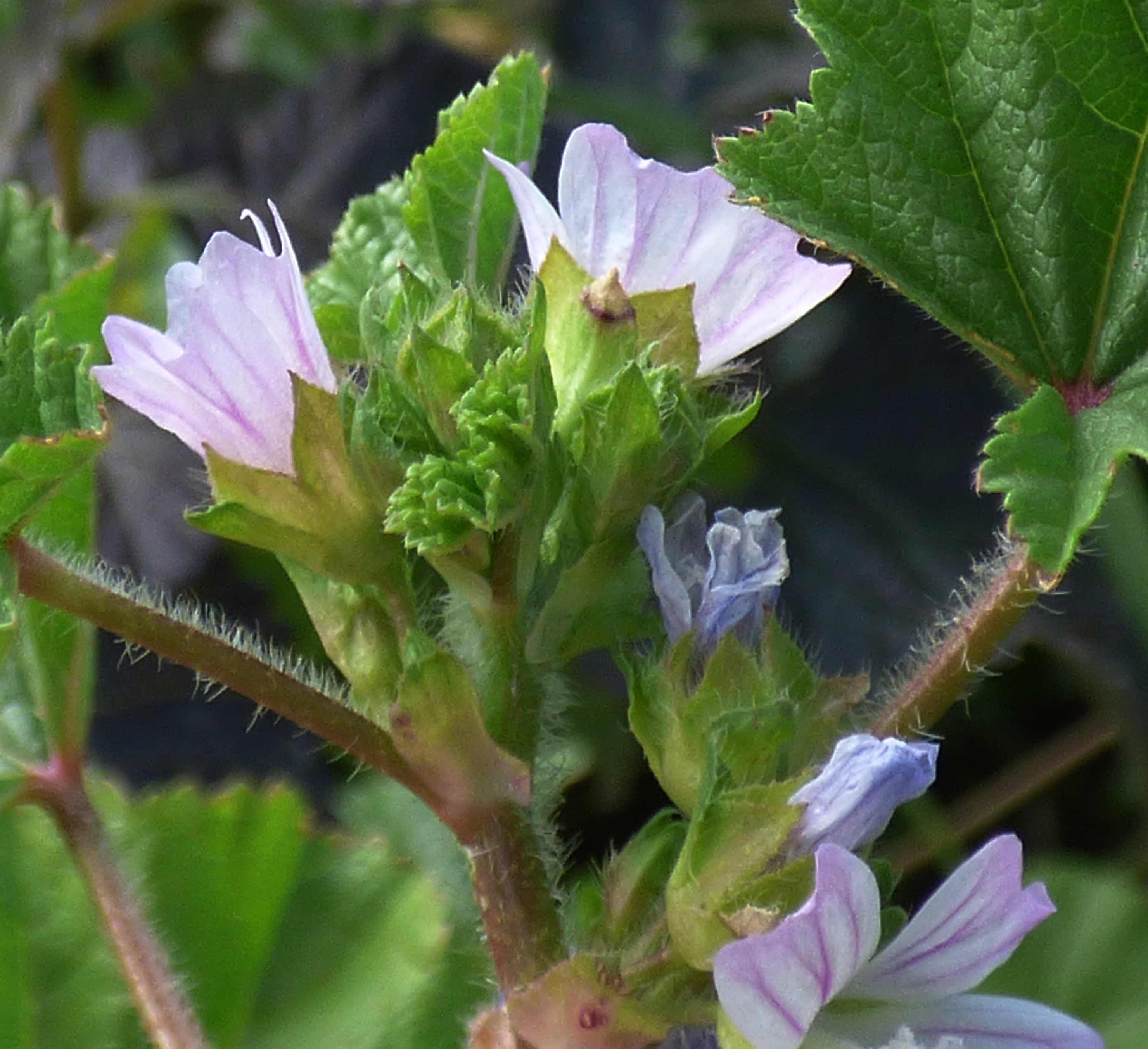
Flowers showing features together

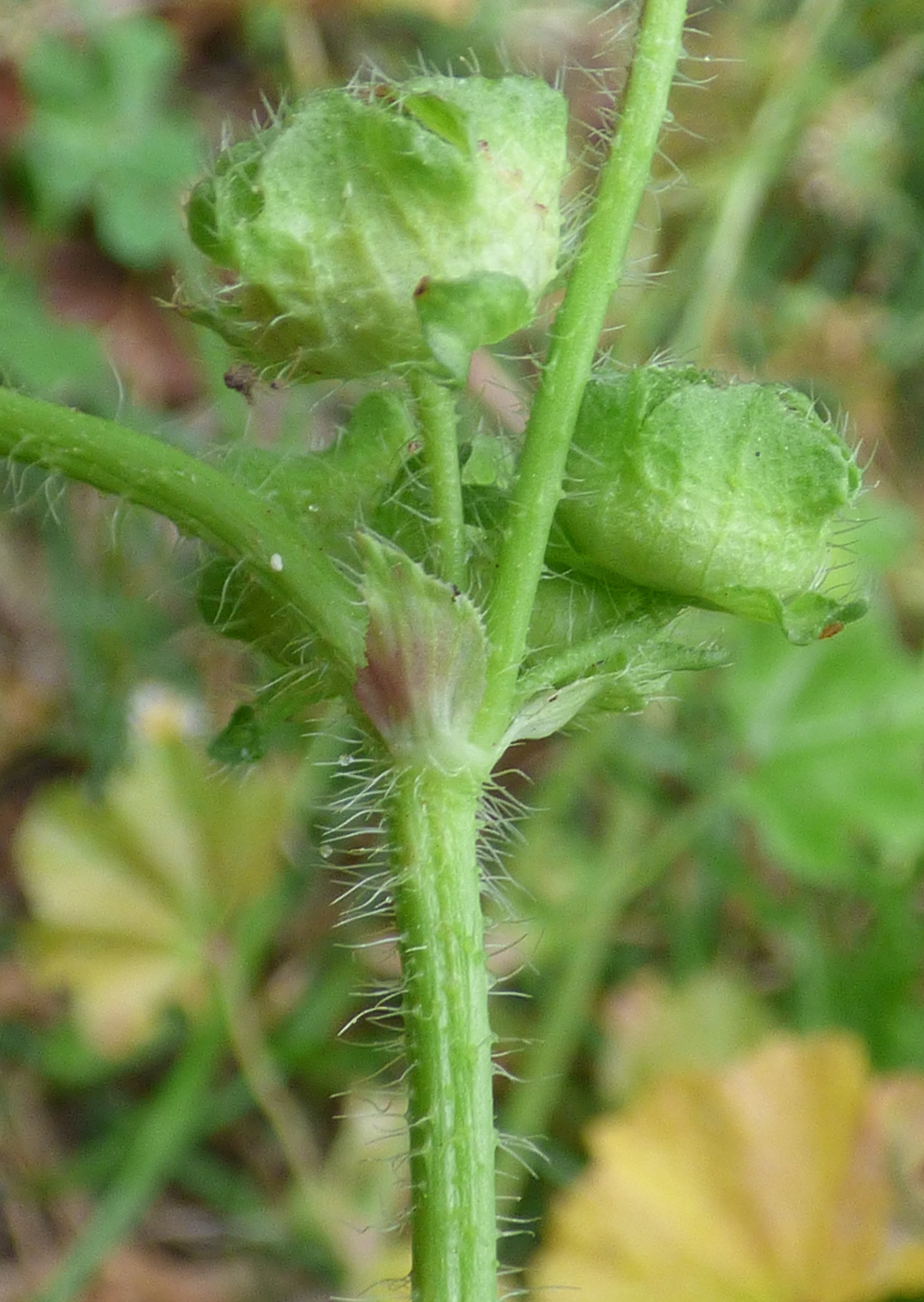
Bracts

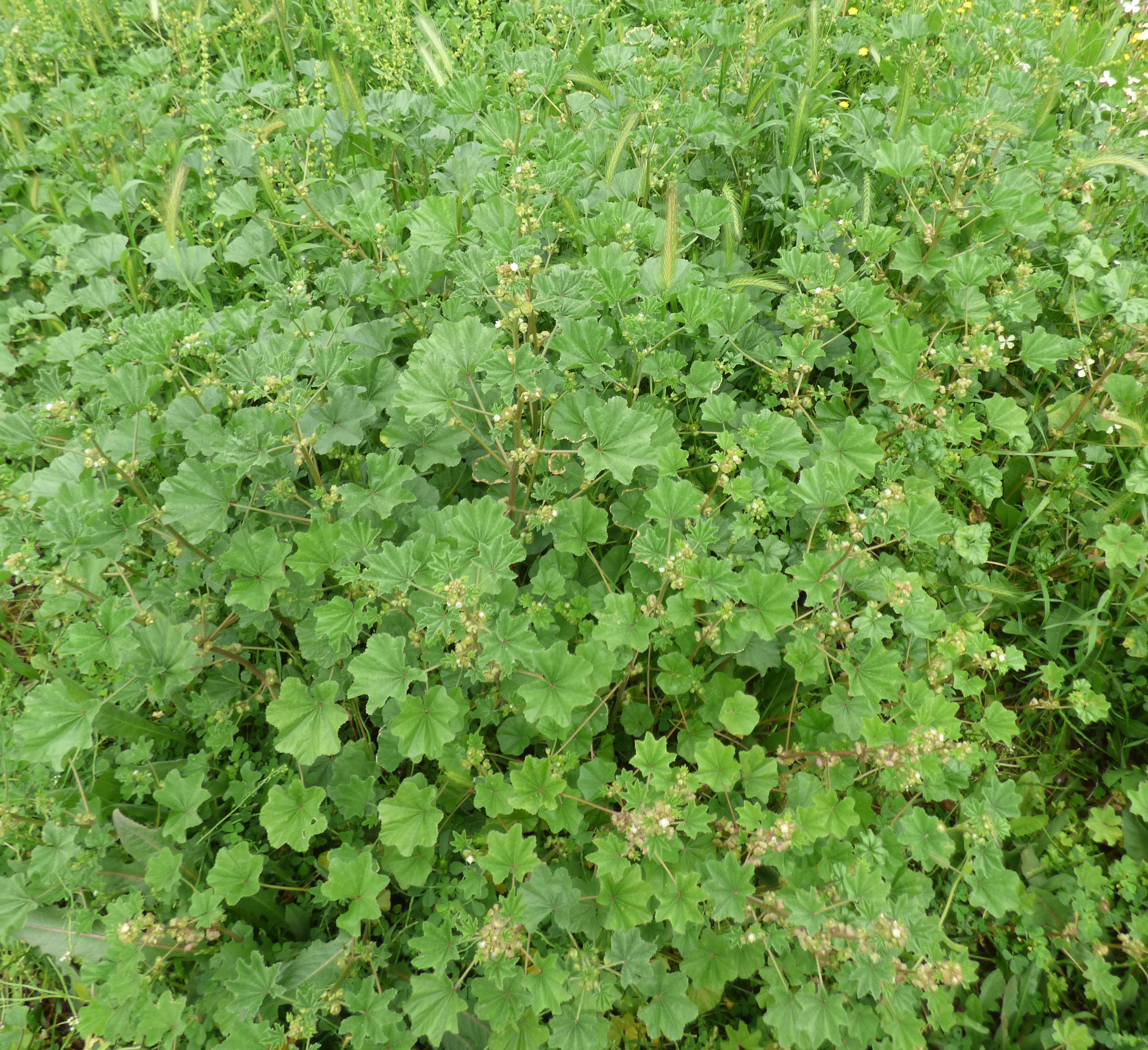
Plant area

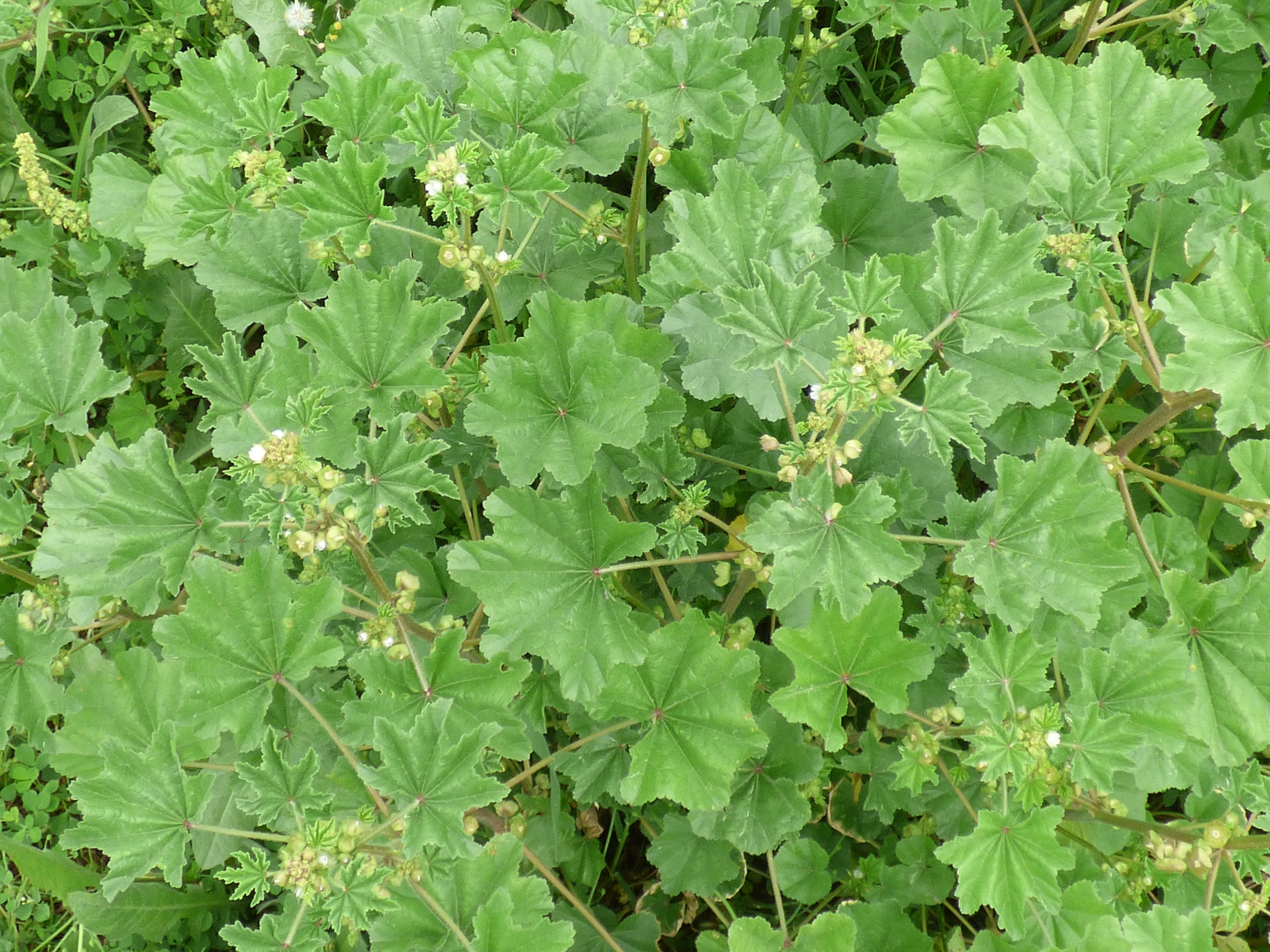
Leafage area

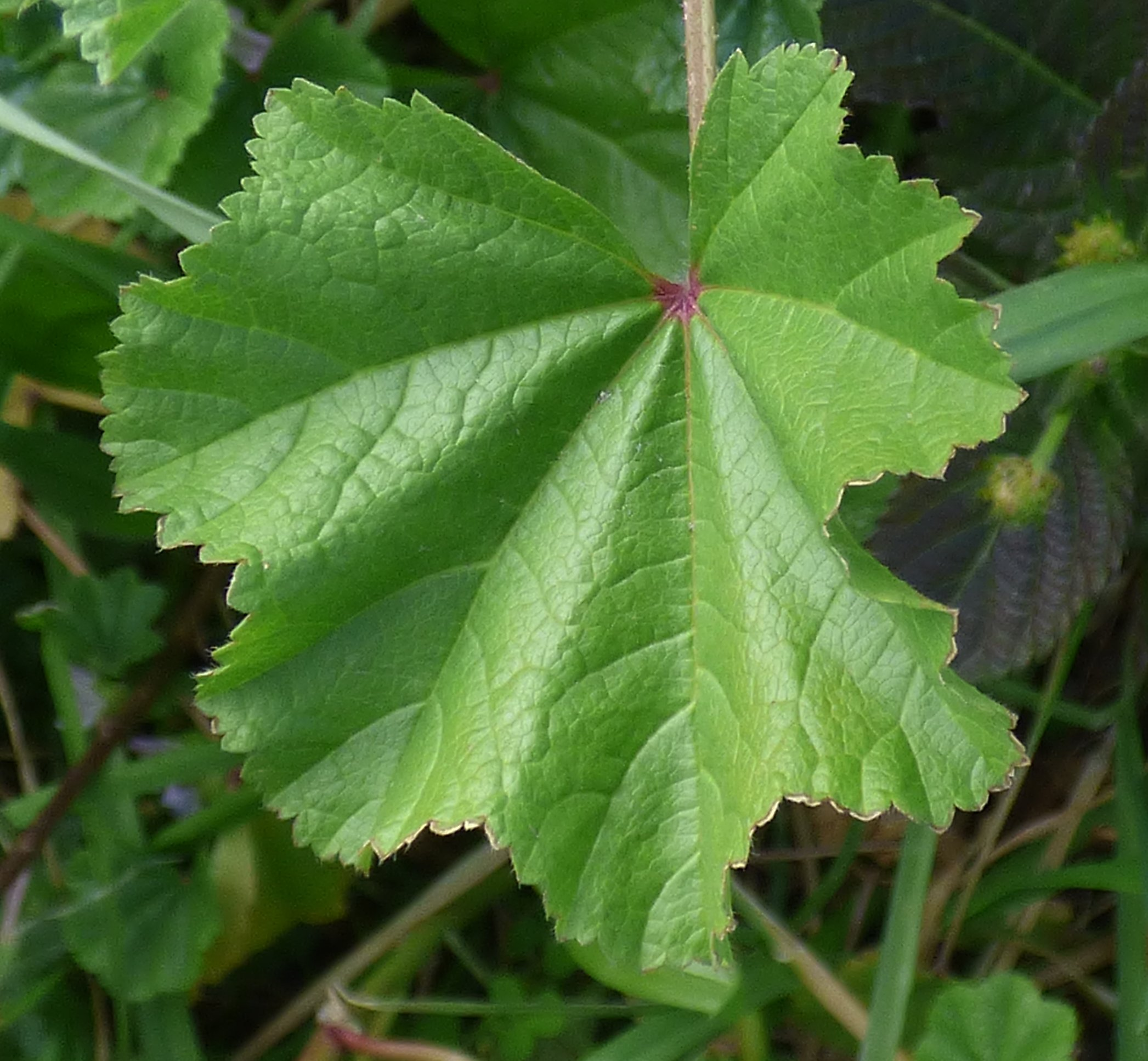
Leaf

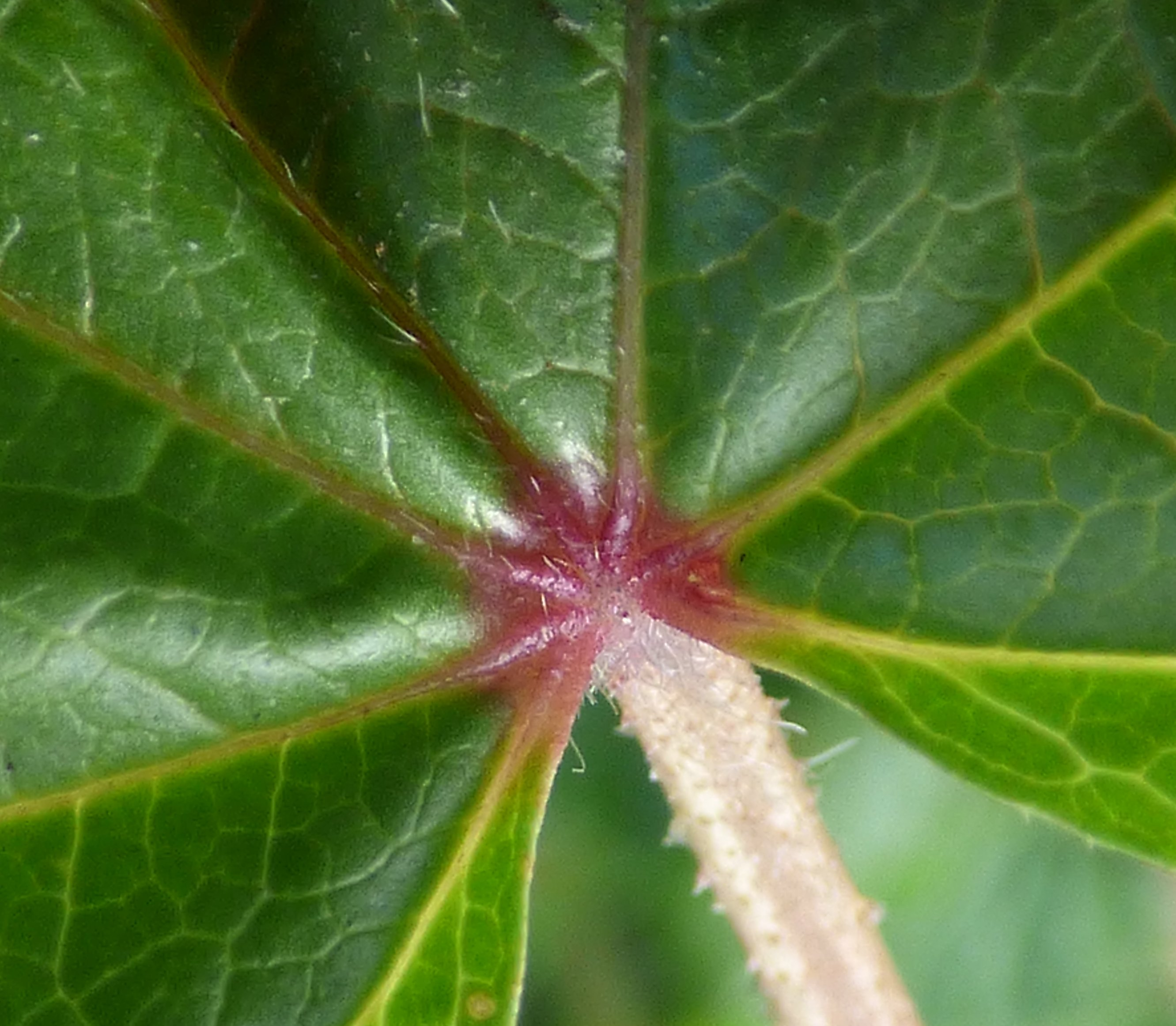
Leaf upperside

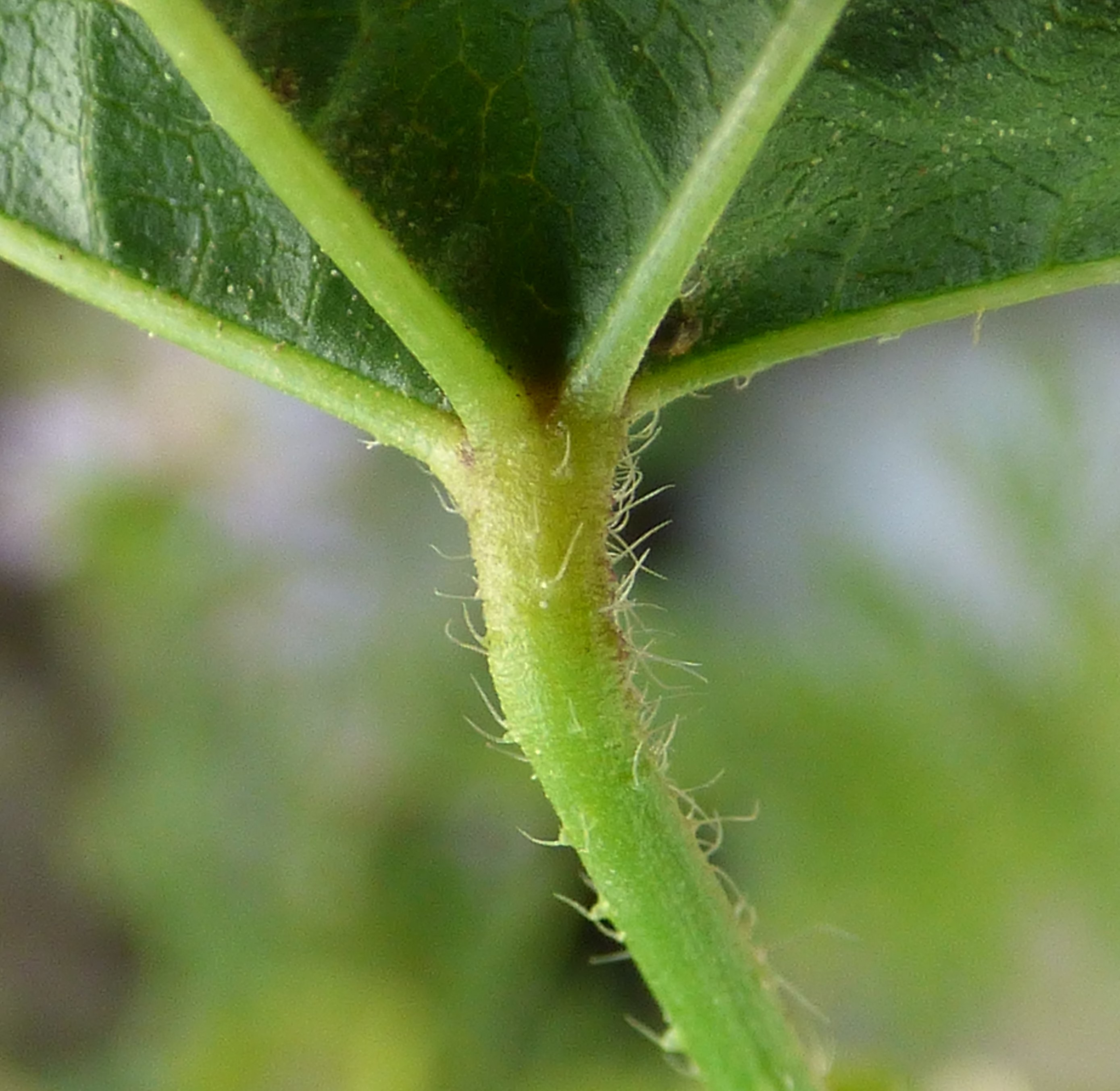
Leaf underside

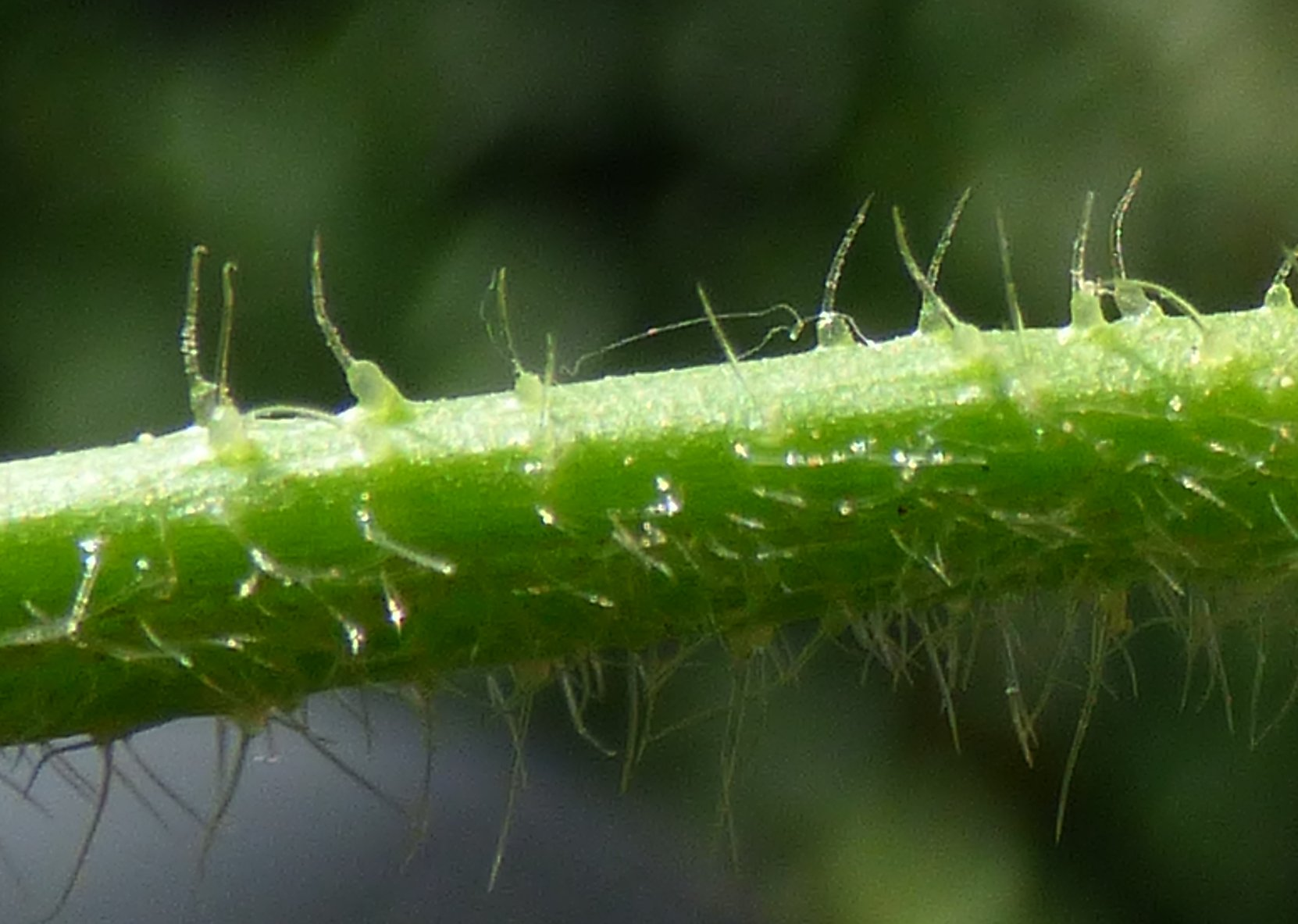
Hairs generally simple with conspicuous bulbous bases (as M. sylvestris)

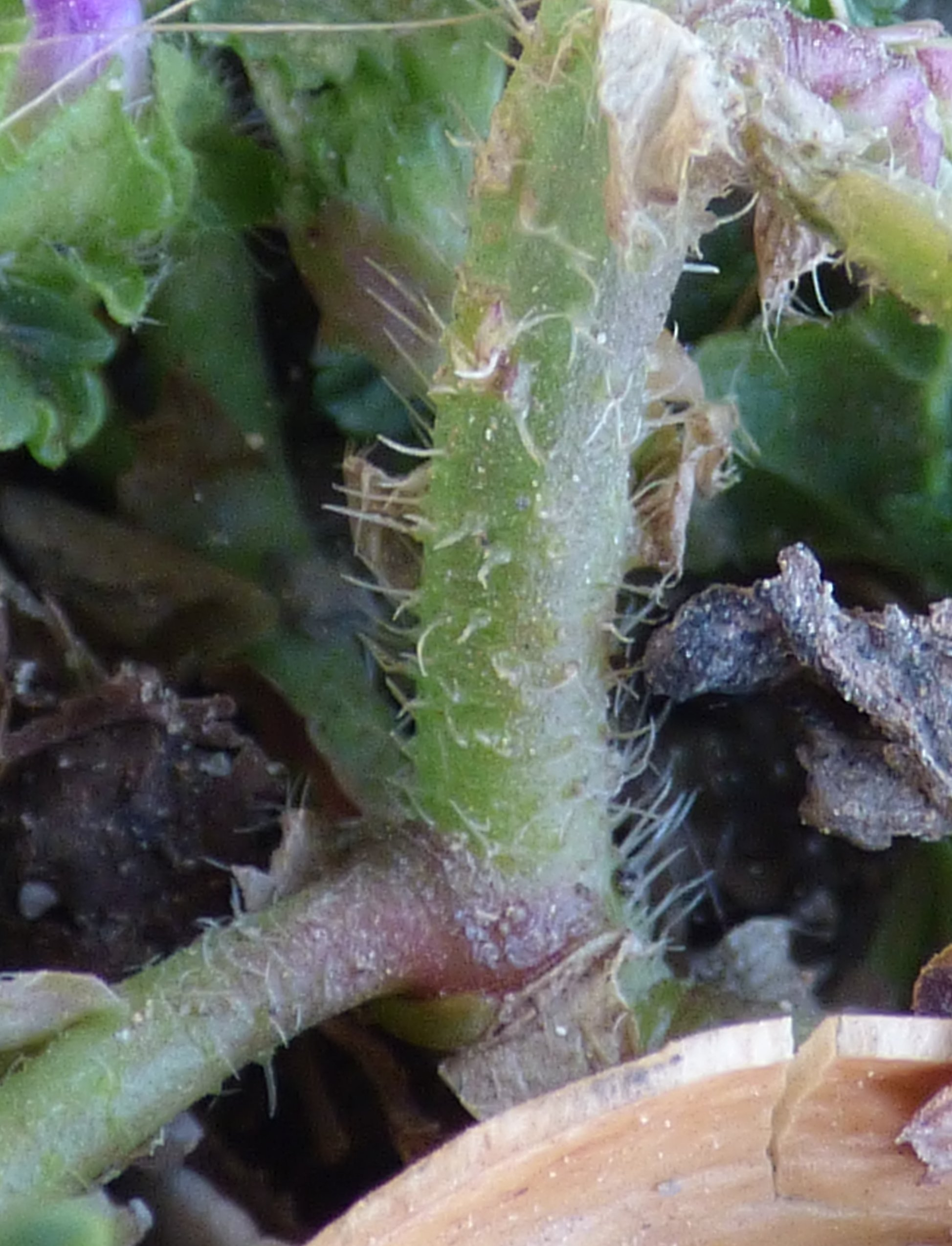
Plant base

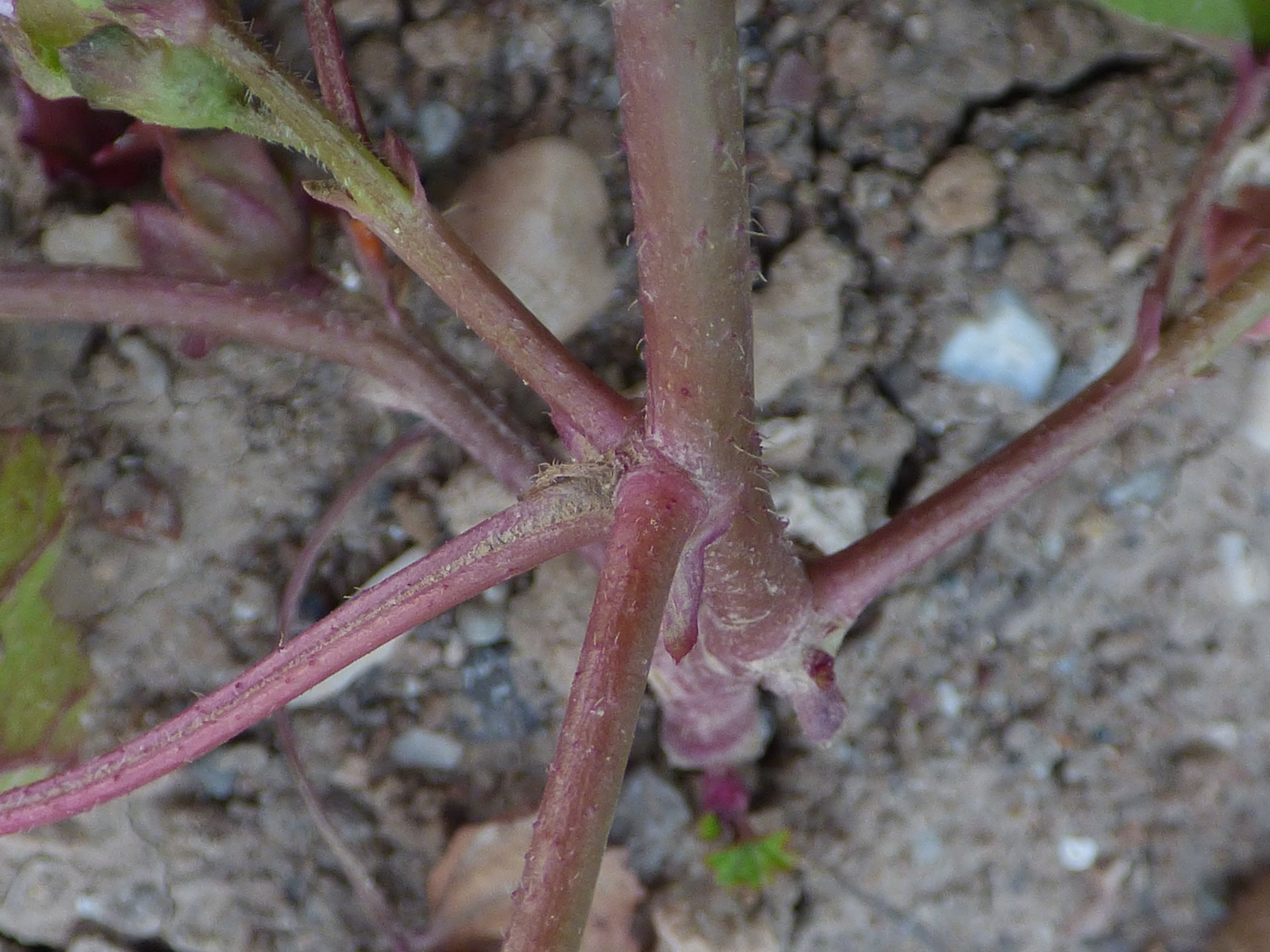
Plant base
