= Famine food =

Food used during times of famine

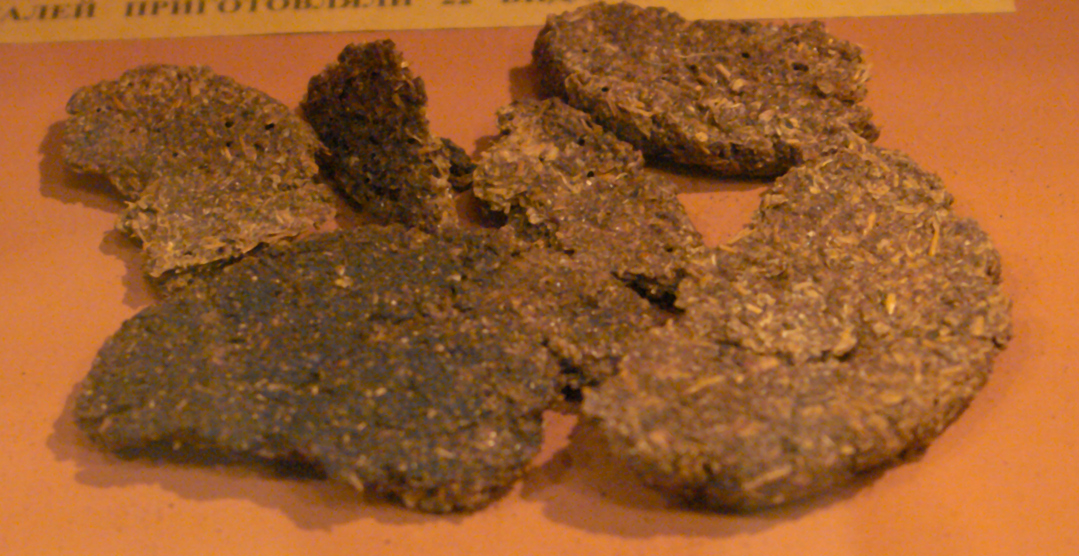
Breads made of orache and bran, fried in machine oil, were used as food in besieged Leningrad.

A famine food or poverty food is any inexpensive or readily available food used to nourish people in times of hunger and starvation, whether caused by extreme poverty, such as during economic depression or war, or by natural disasters such as drought.

The characterization of some foodstuffs as "famine" or "poverty" food can be social. For example, lobster and other crustaceans have been considered poverty food in some societies and luxury food in others, depending on the period and situation.

== Examples ==
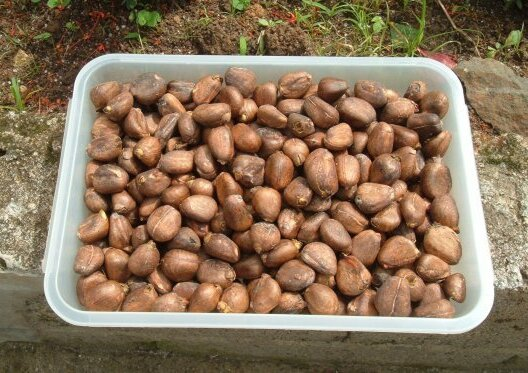
Breadnuts

Several foodstuffs have been strongly associated with famine, war, or times of hardship throughout history:

- In Polynesia, plants from the genus Xanthosoma, known locally as "ape", were considered famine food and used only when the taro crop failed.
- Several species of edible algae, including dulse, channeled wrack and Irish moss (Chondrus crispus), were eaten by coastal peasants during the Great Famine in Ireland of 1846–1848. Further inland, famine foods included stinging nettle, wild mustard, sorrel, and watercress. In the area of Skibbereen, people resorted to eating donkey meat, earning the nickname "Donkey Aters" (Eaters) for people in the area. Others ate dogs, cats, corncrakes, rotten pigs, and even human flesh. The consumption of silverweed, sea anemones, wild carrot, sloes, pignut, common limpet, snails, dock leaves, sycamore seeds, laurel berries, holly berries, dandelion, juices of red clover, and heather blossoms are also recorded. Many accounts of the Famine mention people dying with green stains around their mouths from eating grass or other green plants.
- Sego lily bulbs were eaten by the Mormon pioneers when their food crops failed.
- Tulip bulbs and sugar beets were eaten in the German-occupied parts of the Netherlands during the "hunger winter" of 1944–45.
- During a number of famines in Russia and the Soviet Union, nettle, orache, and other types of wild plants were used to make breads or soups.
- In Iceland, rural parts of Sweden, and Western Finland, mushrooms were not widely eaten before World War II. They were viewed as food for cows and were also associated with the stigma of being a wartime and poverty food.
- In times of famine in Scandinavia, the cambium (phloem) of deciduous trees was dried, ground, and added to extend what grain flour was available, to create bark bread. This is thought to be a Sami tradition.
- The word Adirondack, describing the indigenous peoples that lived in the Adirondack Mountains in New York, is thought to come from the Mohawk word 'ha-de-ron-dah' meaning 'eaters of trees'. This name was said to be used by the Iroquoians as a derogatory term for groups of Algonquians who did not practice agriculture and therefore sometimes had to eat tree bark to survive harsh winters.
- Cat meat was eaten in the northern Italian regions of Piedmont, Emilia-Romagna, and Liguria in times of famine, such as during World War II.
- Likewise, during the Siege of Paris in the Franco-Prussian War, the menu in Parisian cafes was not limited to cats but also dogs, rats, horses, donkeys, camels, and even elephants.
- During the Japanese occupation of Malaya, due to military food stockpiling and restrictive rationing policies, the locals resorted to surviving on hardy tuberous roots such as cassava, sweet potato, and yam.
- During the Battle of Bataan in the Philippines during World War II, Filipino and American servicemen resorted to consuming dog meat, monkey meat, and the meat of monitor lizards (referred to as "iguana lizards" in the source), pythons, mules, horses, parrots, owls, crocodiles and carabaos as their supply of food dwindled.
- In the semi-arid areas of the Brazilian Northeast, the shoots and leaves of cactus Opuntia cochenillifera are normally used to feed livestock (cattle and goats), but during long droughts, people may use them as a last resort.
- Historically in the Maldives the leaves of seaside trees such as the octopus bush and the beach cabbage were often used as famine food.
- The caper, the flower bud and berry of Capparis spinosa species, has been a famine food in southern Ethiopia and Sudan as well as in the 1948 siege of west Jerusalem.
- During the Cambodian humanitarian crisis, people ate tarantulas, scorpions, silkworms, and grasshoppers. Fried tarantulas later became a delicacy popular with tourists in the Cambodian town of Skuon.
- Morinda citrifolia is sometimes called a "starvation fruit", implying it was used by indigenous peoples in the South Pacific as emergency food during times of famine.
- During the Special Period in the 1990s in Cuba, plantain peels replaced the traditional ground beef in picadillo, and grapefruit pith was boiled, breaded, and fried to create bistec de toronja.
- In Haiti, mud cookies are sometimes eaten by the poorest people to avoid starvation. Similar mud cookies are eaten in Zambia, Guinea and Cameroon for their nutritional content.
- During the German occupation of Poland in World War II people made flour and coffee from acorns. Acorns were also a substitute for potatoes.
- Malva pusilla (small mallow) is known to Palestinians as a famine food called khobeza (Arabic: خُبَيْزَة khubayzah, literally 'small bread'). In April 2024, the New York Times reported that Gazans under siege were eating it to stave off starvation.
- Lard fell out of general use in the late 20th century due to being considered less healthy than vegetable oils, rendering it a stigma of being a poverty food used by those that have no other cooking fat options.
- The breadnut or Maya nut was cultivated by the ancient Mayas but is largely regarded as a poverty food in modern Central America.

== See also ==
- Government cheese
- High energy biscuit
- Khubeza patties
- Jiuhuang Bencao, 1406 Chinese illustrated herbal for famine foods
- List of meat substitutes
- Peasant foods
- Staple food
- Taboo food and drink
- Turnip Winter
