= Israel Kolmodin =

Swedish clergyman (1643–1709)

- Born: 24 December 1643; Enköping, Sweden
- Died: 19 April 1709 (aged 65); Visby, Sweden
- Occupation: priest
- Known for: Den blomstertid nu kommer

Israel Gustaf Kolmodin (24 December 1643 – 19 April 1709) was a Swedish hymnwriter and Lutheran priest, active in the Church of Sweden. He is usually credited for having written the song "Den blomstertid nu kommer."
