= Den blomstertid nu kommer =

Swedish Christian summer song

- Hymn
- English: Now the time of blossoming arrives
- Occasion: end of the school year
- Text: by Israel Kolmodin (attributed)
- Language: Swedish
- Melody: anon
- Published: 1695: Swedish Hymnal

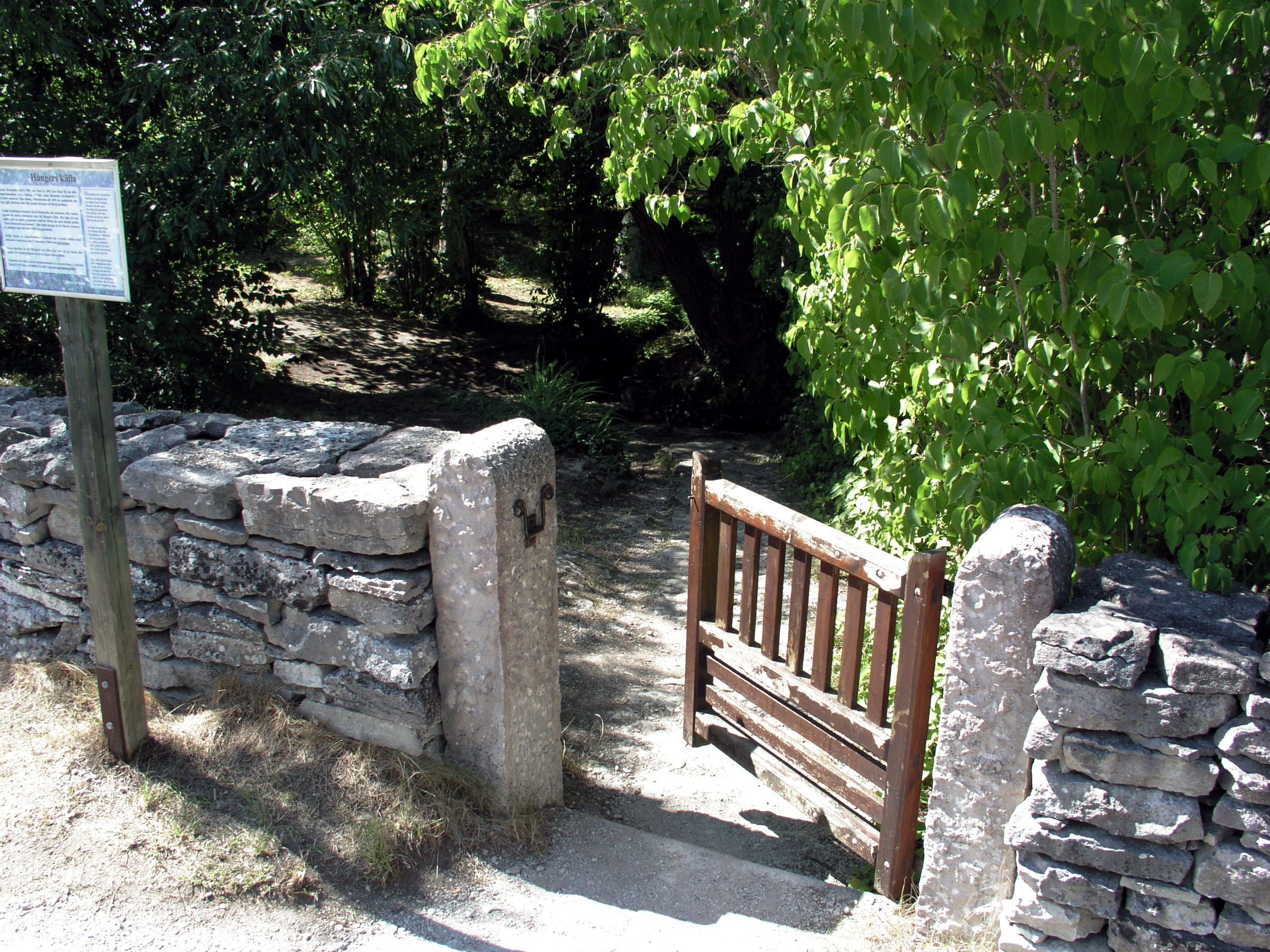
Hångers källa

Den blomstertid nu kommer (lit. 'Now the time of blossoming arrives', and in Finnish Suvivirsi, lit. 'the Summer Psalm', or Jo joutui armas aika, lit. 'Now the Beloved Time Has Come') is a Swedish summertime hymn, traditionally credited to Israel Kolmodin after walking at Hångers källa outside Visby. It was first published in the 1695 Swedish Hymnal, and the Finnish translation was made for the 1701 Finnish Hymnal by Erik Cajanus.

In Sweden and Finland the hymn is traditionally sung at the end of the school year, before the summer holidays, and as such it has reached widespread recognition in both Finnish and Swedish culture. It is strongly associated with summer, as well as primary and secondary education.

The number of verses sung in schools varies, but tends not to include all six. In Sweden, only the first verse is sometimes used, in which the hymn's Christian origins are not apparent. In Finnish-speaking Finland, the hymn is usually sung in three verses in schools.

Zenos E. Hawkinson has written lyrics in English, as "Now Comes the Time for Flowers", from 1978.

== Publication ==
- 1695 års psalmbok as number 317 under the lines "Om Jordenes fruktbarhet".
- 1701 Virsikirja (in Finnish)
- 1819 års psalmbok as number 394 under the lines "Med avseende på särskilda personer, tider och omständigheter: Årets tider och jordens fruktbarhet: Sommaren".
- Finlandssvenska psalmboken 1886
- Finska psalmboken 1886 ("Nya psalmboken") as number 472
- Sionstoner 1889 as number 532.
- Svensk söndagsskolsångbok 1908 as number 283 under the lines "Årstiderna"
- Svensk söndagsskolsångbok 1929 as number 257 under the lines "Naturen och årstiderna"
- Sionstoner 1935 as number 752 under the lines "Årets tider".
- 1937 års psalmbok as number 474 under the lines "Sommaren".
- Den finska psalmboken 1938 as number 557
- Finlandssvenska psalmboken 1943 as number 520
- Psalmer för bruk vid krigsmakten 1961 as number 474 verserna 1–4.
- Frälsningsarméns sångbok 1968 as number 645 under the lines "Årstiderna".
- Den svenska psalmboken 1986 as number 199 under the lines "Årstiderna".
- Finlandssvenska psalmboken 1986 as nummer 535 under the lines "Årstiderna"
- Den finska psalmboken 1986 as number 571 under the lines "Årstiderna"
- Lova Herren 1988 as number 787 under the lines "Årets tider".
- Sångboken 1998 as number 9
- Swedish Hymns, 2016 (as "Now Comes the Time for Flowers")
- Many non-religious songbooks

== Versions ==
- In 2018, Miss Li recorded a wintertime version called "Den vintertid nu kommer" ("Now the wintertime arrives").
