= Khubeza patties =

Israeli food

- Alternative names: Ktzitzot khalmit
- Course: Appetizer or main dish
- Place of origin: Israel
- Region or state: Jerusalem
- Serving temperature: Hot
- Main ingredients: Mallow, bulgur/bread crumbs/pita, eggs, onion, olive oil

Khubeza patties (Hebrew: קציצות חובזה) are fried patties made of khubeza, a variety of mallow native to the Levant region, combined with bulgur, pita crumbs, eggs, spices, garlic and onions.

== History ==
During the siege of Jerusalem, when convoys of food could not reach the city, residents of Jerusalem went out to the fields to pick khubeza, a wild green which is high in iron and vitamins. The Jerusalem radio station Kol Hamagen broadcast instructions for cooking it. The broadcast, picked up in Jordan, convinced the Arabs that the Jews were dying of starvation and that victory was at hand.

== Variations ==
Jute mallow (molokhia) leaves can be used instead of khubeza.

== See also ==
- Israeli cuisine
