= A. pedestris =

A. pedestris may refer to:

- Acantholycosa pedestris, a wolf spider species found in Europe
- Antaxius pedestris, a cricket species
- Acanthaspis pedestris, an assassin bug species
