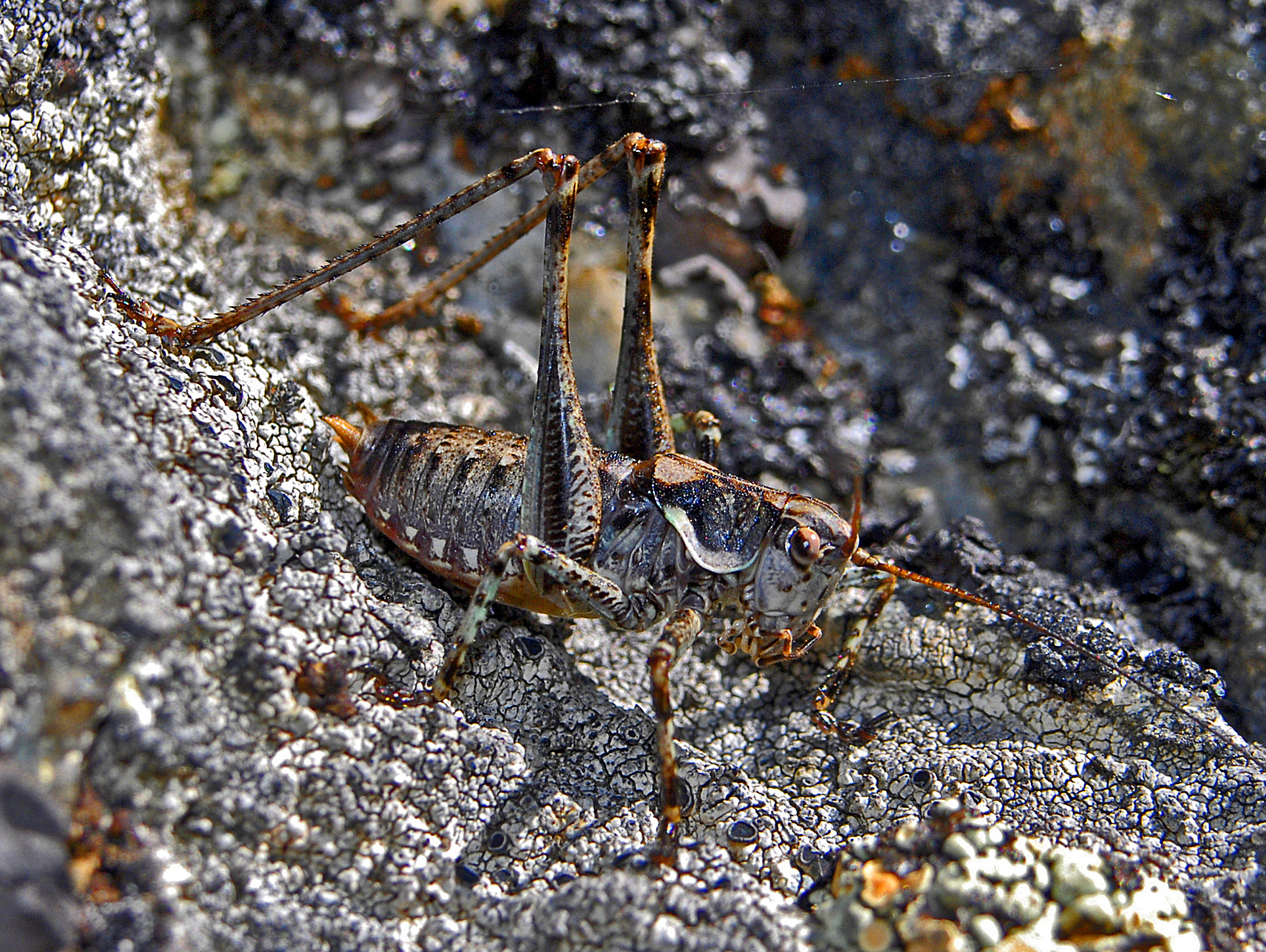
- Antaxius pedestris, male

Scientific classification
- Domain: Eukaryota
- Kingdom: Animalia
- Phylum: Arthropoda
- Class: Insecta
- Order: Orthoptera
- Suborder: Ensifera
- Family: Tettigoniidae
- Tribe: Platycleidini
- Genus: Antaxius; Brunner von Wattenwyl, 1882

= Antaxius =

Genus of cricket-like animals

Antaxius is a genus of bush crickets in the tribe Platycleidini found in Europe.

== Species ==
The Orthoptera Species file lists:

subgenus Antaxius Brunner von Wattenwyl, 1882

1. Antaxius armillata (Serville, 1838)
2. Antaxius pauliani Chopard, 1939
3. Antaxius tavaresi Aires & Menano, 1922

subgenus Chopardius Harz, 1969

1. Antaxius beieri Harz, 1966
2. Antaxius chopardi Morales Agacino, 1936
3. Antaxius florezi Bolivar, 1900
4. Antaxius hispanicus Bolívar, 1887
5. Antaxius kraussi (Bolivar, 1878)
6. Antaxius pedestris (Fabricius, 1787)
7. Antaxius sorrezensis (Marquet, 1877)
8. Antaxius spinibrachius (Fischer, 1853)

subgenus Cyrnantaxius Chopard, 1951

- Antaxius bouvieri Chopard, 1923

subgenus Hoelzeliana Harz, 1962

- Antaxius difformis (Brunner von Wattenwyl, 1861) - type species (as Pterolepis brunneri Krauss, by subsequent designation)
