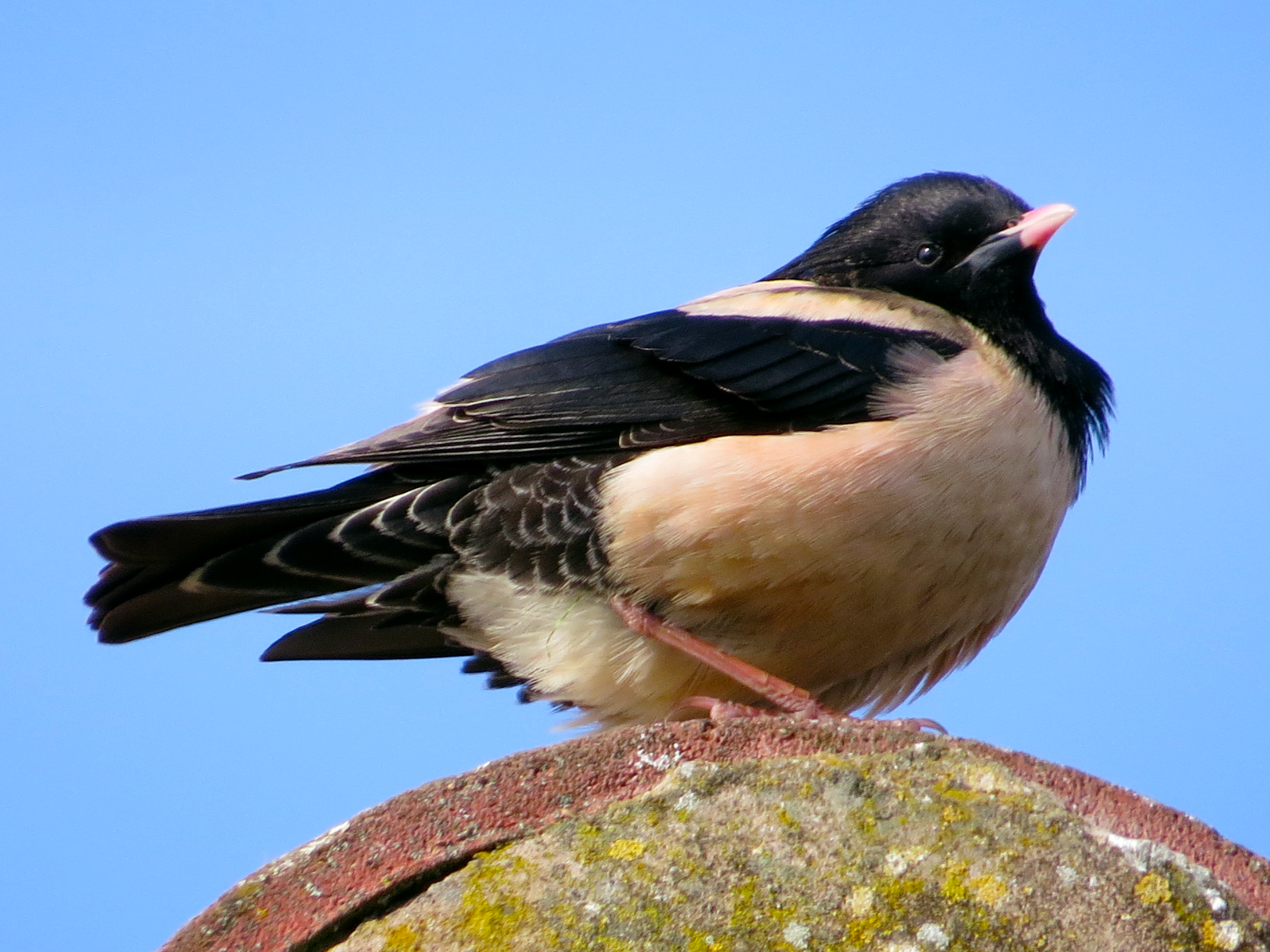
- Adult in summer plumage

Conservation status
- Least Concern (IUCN 3.1)

Scientific classification
- Kingdom: Animalia
- Phylum: Chordata
- Class: Aves
- Order: Passeriformes
- Family: Sturnidae
- Genus: Pastor; Temminck, 1815
- Species: P. roseus

Binomial name
- Pastor roseus (Linnaeus, 1758)
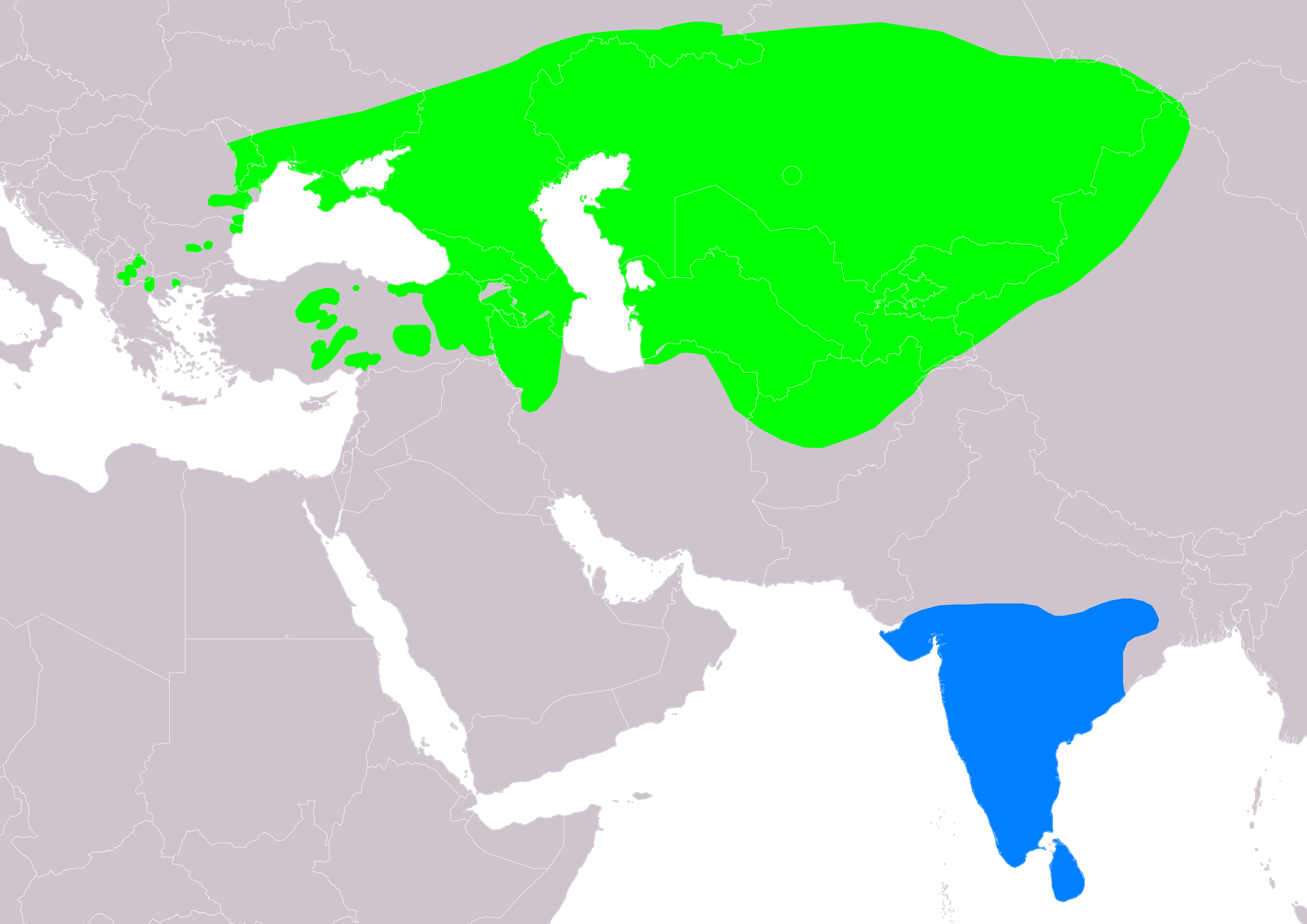
- Range of P. roseus (Compiled by: BirdLife International and Handbook of the Birds of the World (2016) 2007, IUCN 2020.1) Breeding Non-breeding

Synonyms
- Turdus roseus Linnaeus, 1758; Sturnus roseus (Linnaeus, 1758)

= Rosy starling =

Species of bird

The rosy starling (Pastor roseus), also known as the rose-coloured starling, is a passerine bird in the starling family Sturnidae. The species was restored to its own monotypic genus Pastor in 2008, formerly being included in a wide interpretation of the genus Sturnus. This split is supported by further studies, with its closest relative now thought to be the wattled starling (Creatophora cinerea) of tropical Africa, with these two then closest to a large group of Asian starlings and mynas.

== Taxonomy ==
The rosy starling was formally described in 1758 by the Swedish naturalist Carl Linnaeus in the tenth edition of his Systema Naturae. He placed it with the thrushes in the genus Turdus and coined the binomial name Turdus roseus. Linnaeus gave the type locality as Lapland and Switzerland. It is now the only species placed in the genus Pastor that was introduced by the Dutch zoologist Coenraad Jacob Temminck in 1815. The species is monotypic, with no subspecies being recognised. The genus name and the old English name come from the Latin pastor meaning "shepherd", and by extension a pastor. The specific roseus is Latin for "rose-coloured".

== Description ==
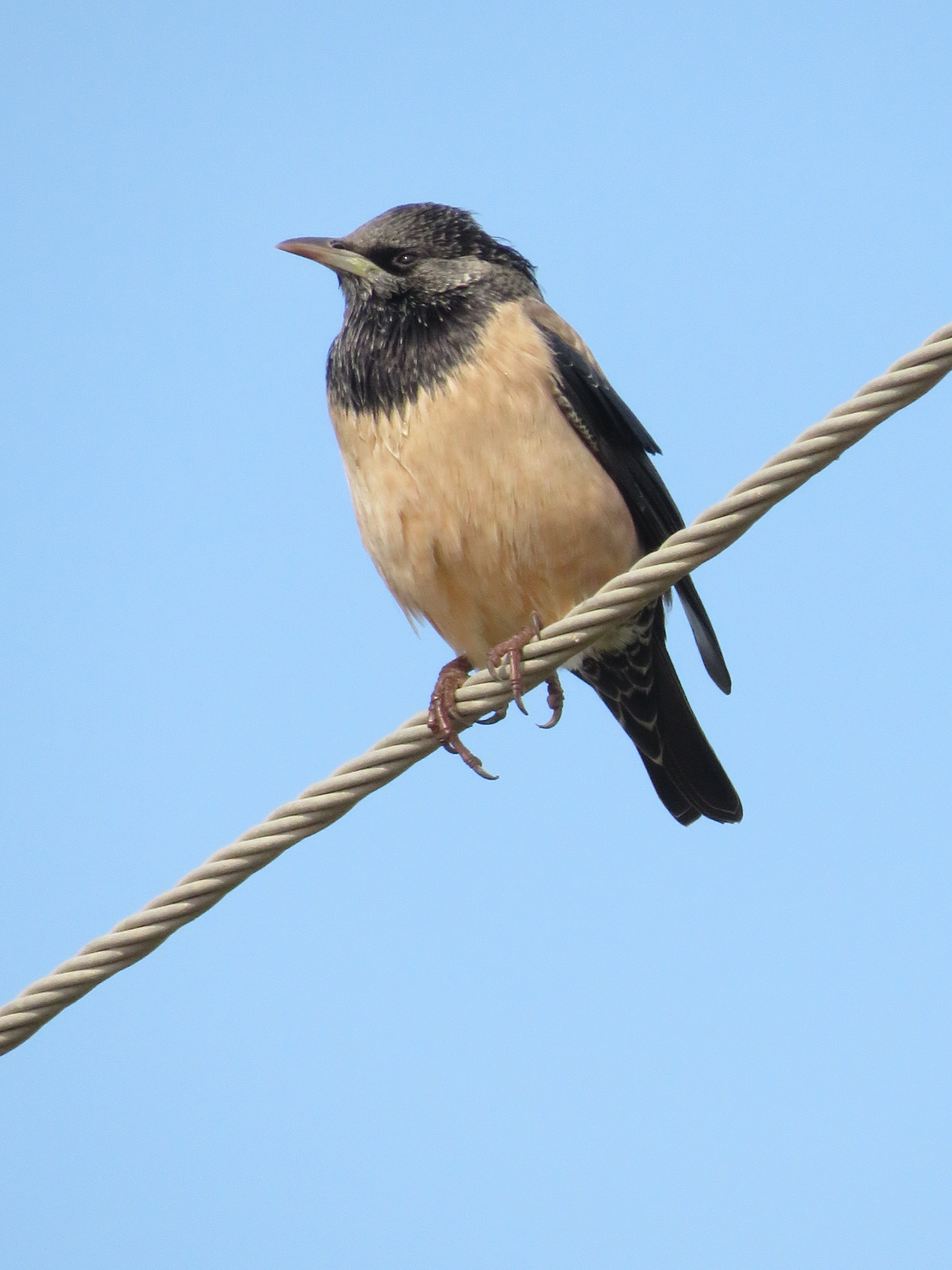
Adult in winter plumage, Gujarat, India

The adult rosy starling is about the same size as a common starling, 19–22 cm long, and with a weight of 60–88 g. The breeding plumage is highly distinctive, with its pink body, glossy black head, wings and tail; the legs are pink to pale orange, and bill has a black base and a bright pink tip. Males in the breeding season have elongated head feathers which form a wispy crest that is fluffed and more prominent when the bird gets excited. In winter, the crest is shorter, and the edges of black feathers within the plumage become paler from the edges of the fresh feathers after the autumn moult. In winter plumage, the body feathers are a comparatively dull greyish-pink, and the bill is also grey. Females have a shorter crest and lack the sharp separation between pink and black.

The juveniles are pale buffy brown, and can be distinguished from common starling (Sturnus vulgaris) by its obviously paler plumage and short yellow bill. Young birds moult into a subdued version of the adult plumage in late autumn (about 2–3 months later than juvenile common starlings), but still lack the crest. They do not acquire their adult plumage until they are nearly one year old in females, and nearly two years in males. The latter grow plumage very similar to adult females in their second year, but are distinguished by longer crests and noticeably pale feather edges than female juvenile birds.

== Distribution and habitat ==
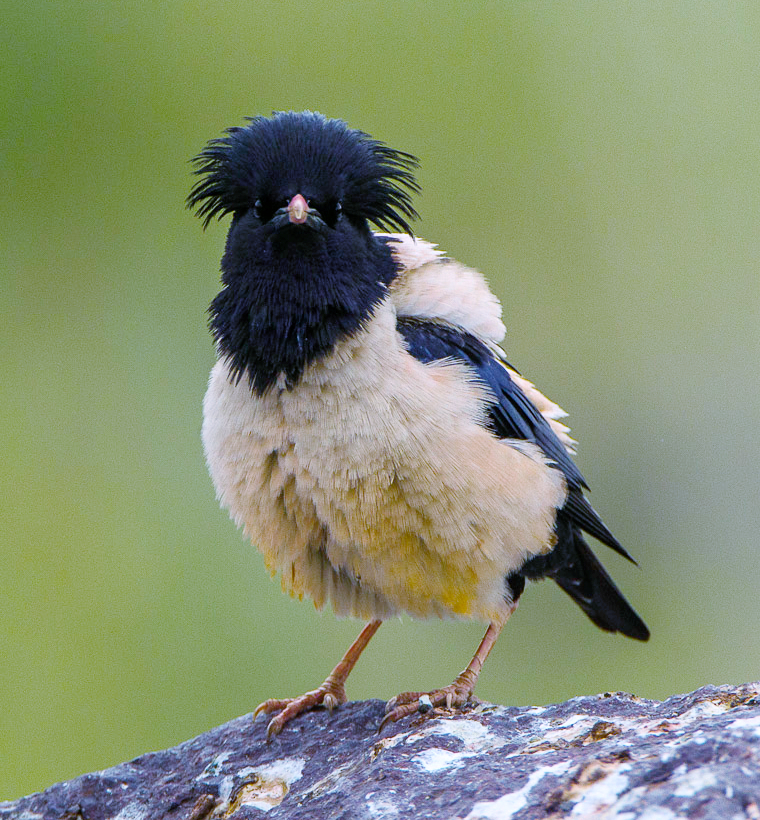
In Kazakhstan

The breeding range of this bird is in steppes, semi-deserts and deserts of Central Asia and Southeast Europe. It can be found from northwestern Mongolia via Dzungarei, Xinjiang, Kazakhstan, Kyrgyzstan, Tajikistan, Uzbekistan and Turkmenistan to southern Russia, Ukraine, Azerbaijan and Armenia. Its southern range extends to the north of Afghanistan and Iran. Irregular breeding is also observed outside of this area, west to Romania and Bulgaria, in some years. It is a strong migrant, and winters in India. In India in winter, it often appears to outnumber the local starlings and mynas. The rosy starling is a bird of steppe and open agricultural land. In years when grasshoppers and other insects are abundant, it will irrupt well beyond its core range, with significant numbers reaching France, the United Kingdom and Ireland.

== Behaviour and ecology ==
Rosy starlings are highly gregarious birds, and often form large, noisy flocks, which can on occasion be a pest for growers of cereal crops or orchards; the birds are strongly attracted to flowering trees. However, they are also greatly beneficial to farmers because they prey on pests such as locusts and grasshoppers, thereby limiting their numbers. The birds breed in tight colonies in a very short breeding season timed to take advantage of peak abundance of grasshoppers between May to June.

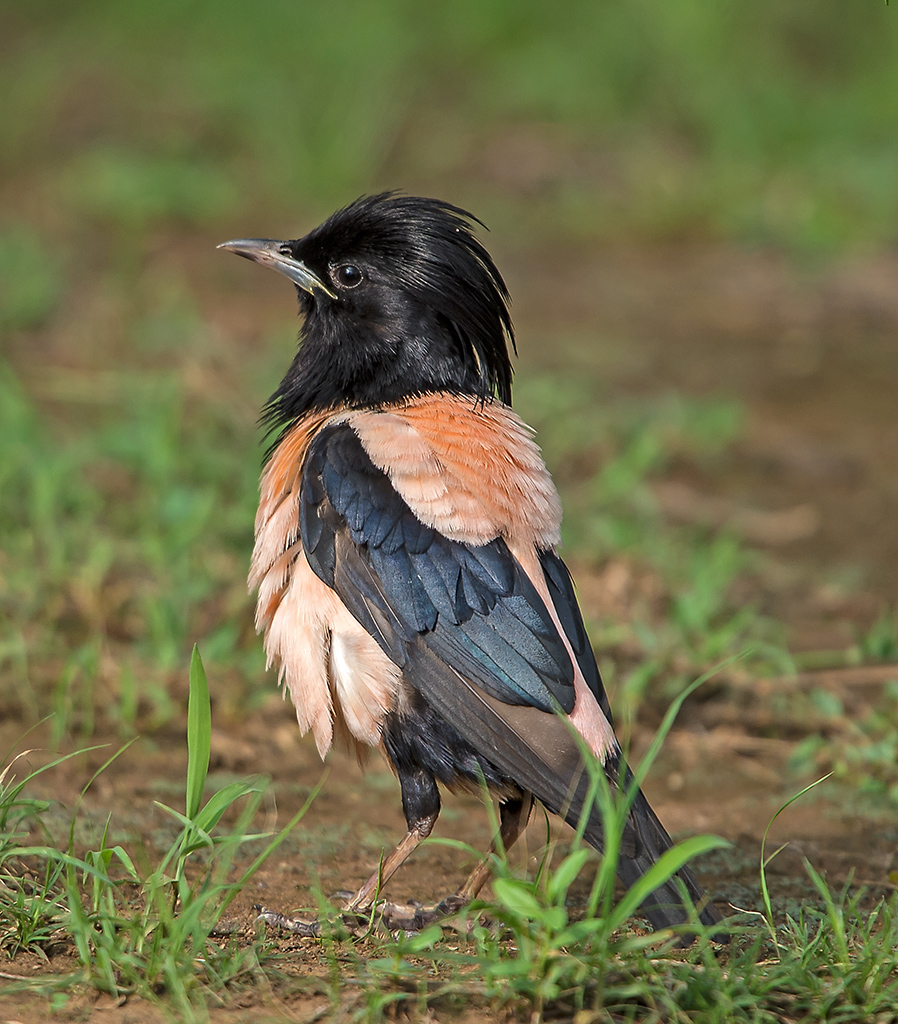
Male

=== Breeding ===
The rosy starling is a colonial breeder, and like other starlings, is highly gregarious, forming large winter flocks. It also shares other species' omnivorous diet, although it prefers insects. The song is a typical starling mixture of squeaks and rattles, given with much wing trembling. In Xinjiang, China, farmers used to use insecticide to eliminate locust, which is costly and polluting. In the 1980s, experts found that rosy starlings which fly to Xinjiang farms and feed on locusts could be used for control instead. The experts begin to build artificial nests to attract rosy starlings, an effort reported to be so successful that the number of locusts was insufficient to feed the birds, causing many juveniles to die from hunger. By the 2000s many Xinjiang farms greatly decreased the usage of insecticide.

=== Food and feeding ===
The rosy starling feeds chiefly on insects in the summer, with fruit, berries, flower-nectar, and cereal grain more important in winter. Specific observations of preferred food types made on the feeding habits of rosy starling are listed as:

- Insects: largely locusts and grasshoppers, beetles of the families Lucanidae, Elateridae, Tenebrionidae, Buprestidae, Scarabaeidae and Curculionidae.
- Fruit and berries: Ficus (many species), Lantana spp., Ziziphus oenopolia, Bridelia montana, Streblus asper, grapes, mulberries (Morus), dates, Salvadora persica, Capparis aphylla and chillies.
- Flower-nectar: Salmalia persica, Bombax insigne, Erythrina indica and Erythrina suberosa, Butea monosperma, Careya arborea.
- Cereal grains: Jowar and bajra.

== Gallery ==
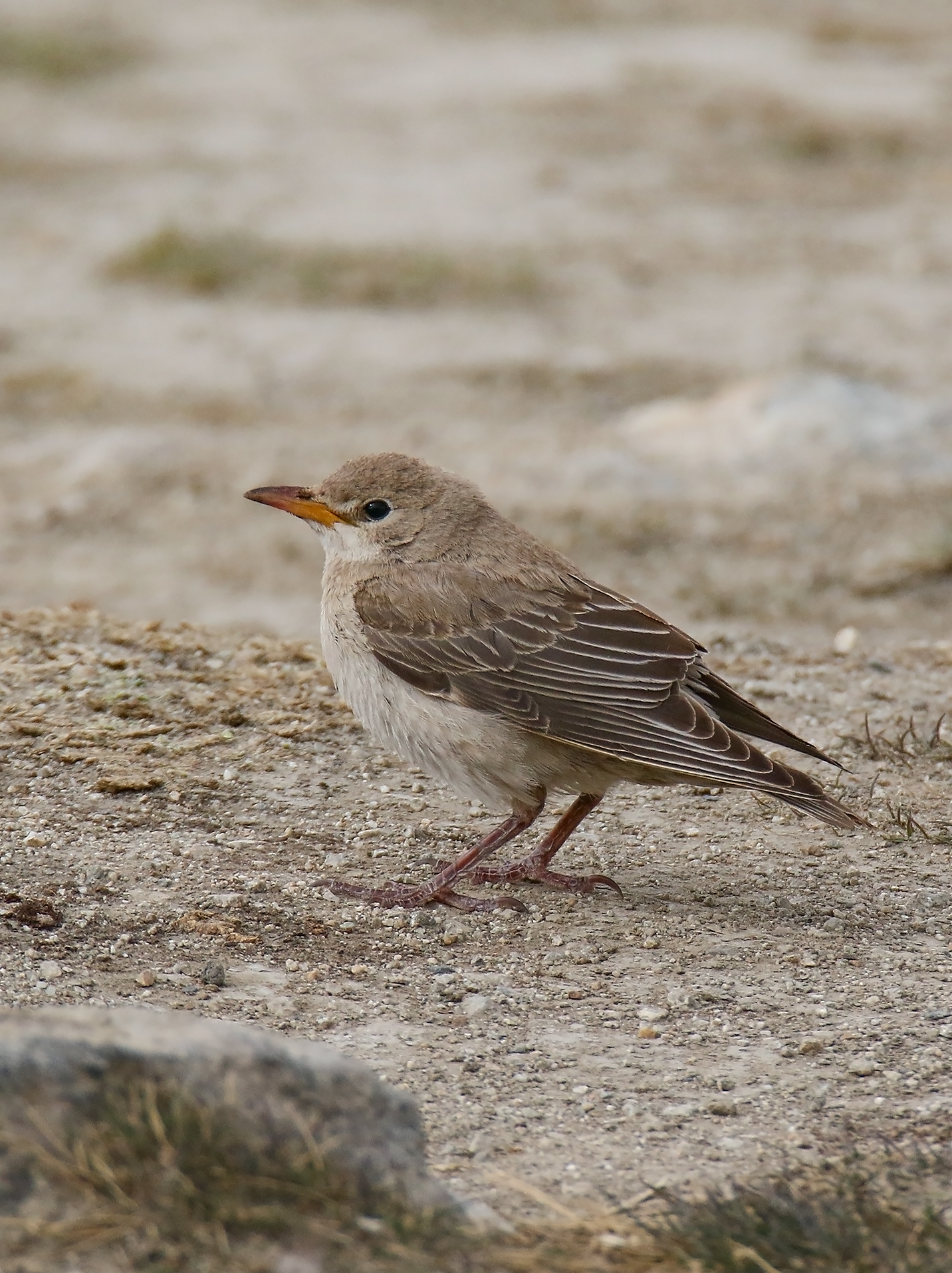
Juvenile

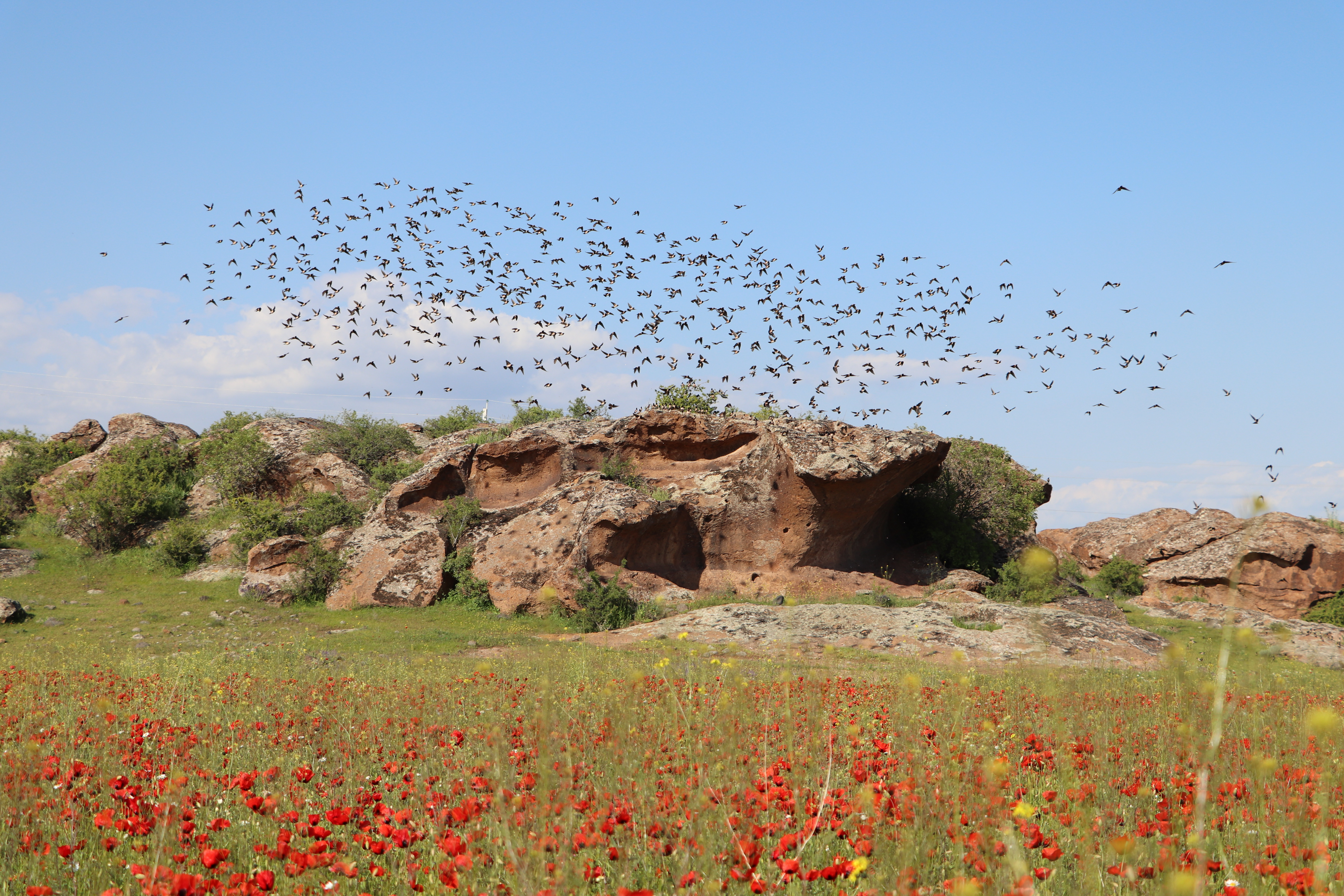
Rosy starling flock, Armenia

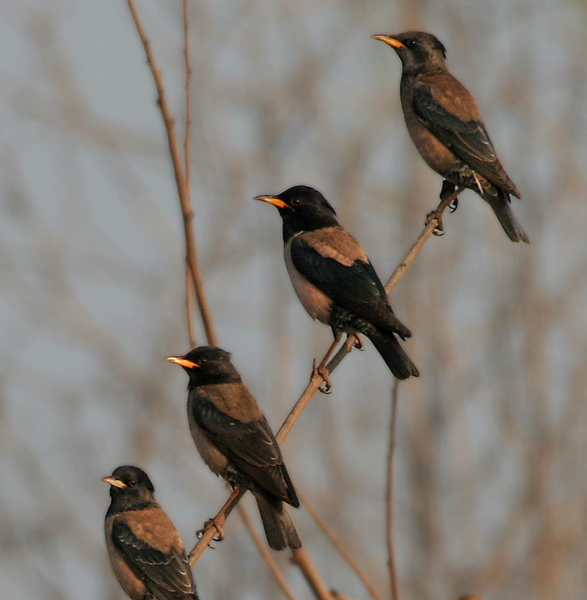
In Hyderabad, India

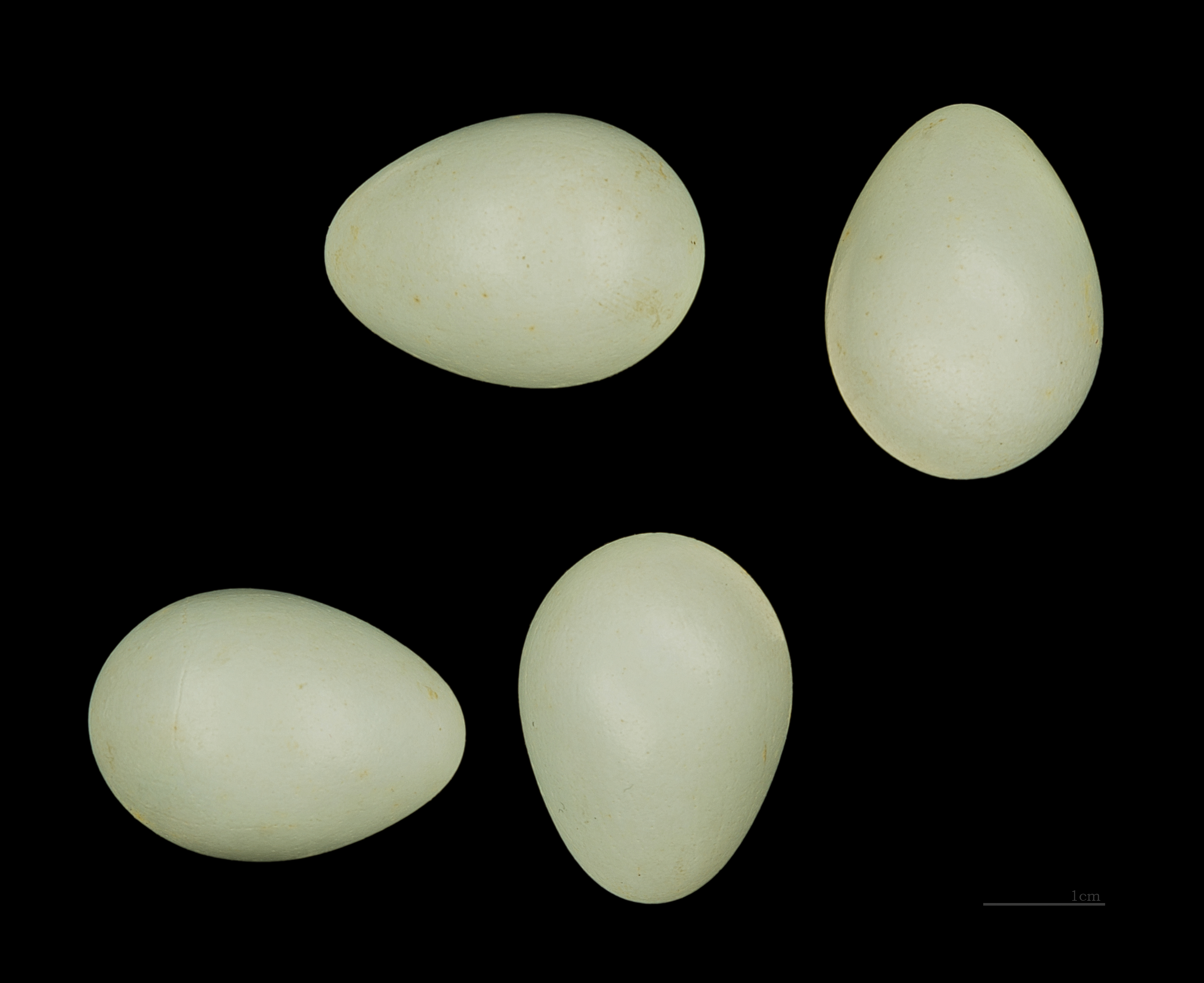
Eggs

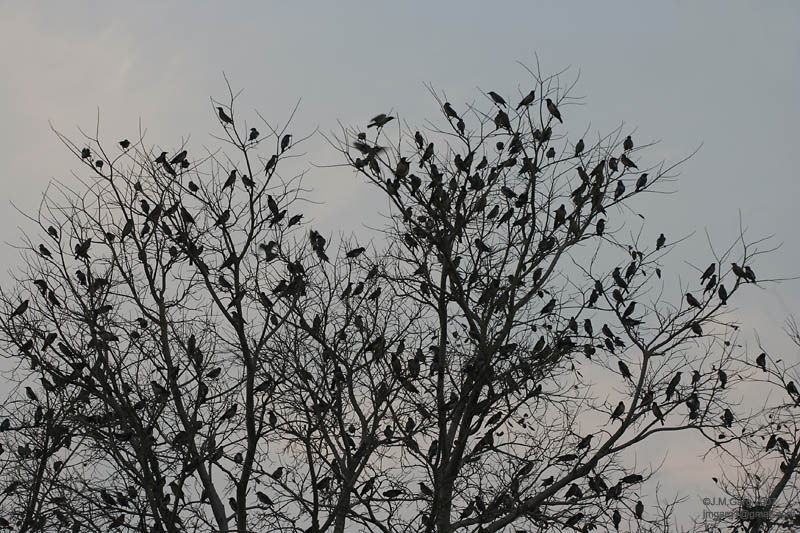
Gathering in the evening before roosting in Vadodara, Gujarat, India

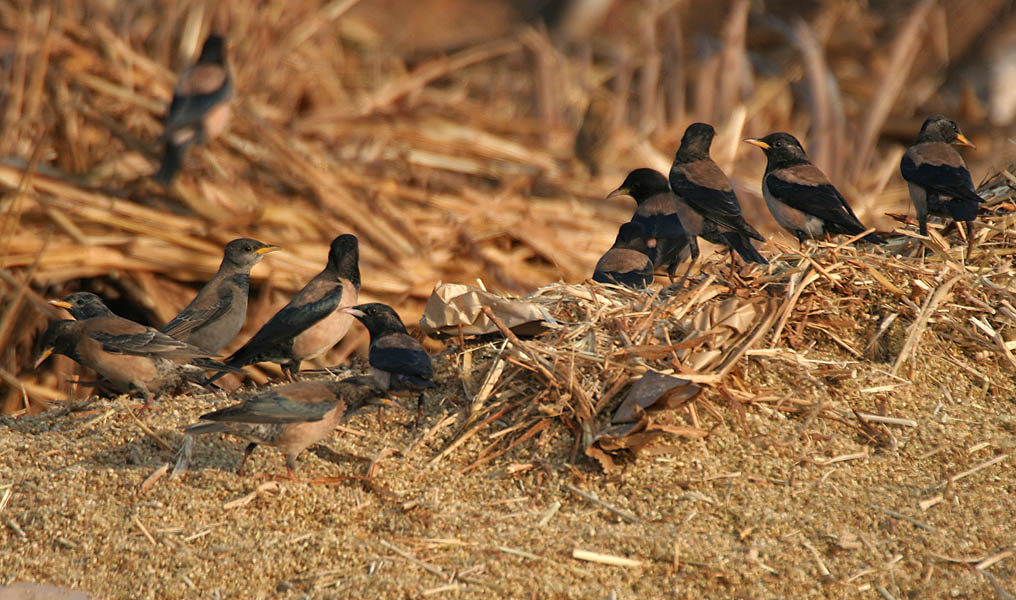
Rosy starlings near Hyderabad
