= Coptotermes heimi =

Scientific classification
- Domain: Eukaryota
- Kingdom: Animalia
- Phylum: Arthropoda
- Class: Insecta
- Order: Blattodea
- Infraorder: Isoptera
- Genus: Coptotermes
- Species: C. heimi

Binomial name
- Coptotermes heimi (Wasmann)

Species of termite

Coptotermes heimi is a species of termite in the family Heterotermitidae. It is found in India, Pakistan and Bangladesh and lives wholly underground.

== Distribution and habitat ==
Coptotermes heimi occurs in Pakistan, the Indian states of Rajasthan, Uttar Pradesh and Punjab, and in Bangladesh. It is a serious pest in both agricultural and urban areas, but being a subterranean termite, its presence is not always apparent. Besides attacking logs and structural timbers, it can attack living trees, hollowing out the centre.

== Ecology ==
Coptotermes heimi make subterranean tunnels in order to forage for suitable food sources. If the surface soil is either too hot or too cold, the termites move deeper into the soil, but when conditions are equable, the foraging tunnels are about 45 cm (18 in) beneath the surface. The direction in which the termites dig the tunnels is influenced by the humidity of the soil, and the presence of rotten wood also acts as an attractant. Many termites work together to dig the tunnels, each individual carrying a single mouthful of soil. Similarly, when a food source is found, each termite carries a mouthful of food along the pre-existing tunnel back to the nest.

The termites feed on the bark and soft parts around the base of trees, and the stems of sugarcane. The ground-dwelling assassin bug Acanthaspis quinquespinosa is a voracious predator of Coptotermes heimi. When the termites are numerous, each assassin bug can kill forty termites a day.

Termites feed on wood and wood product, relying on micro-organisms in their gut to digest the cellulose. In feeding trials, it was found that Coptotermes heimi preferentially fed on Populus euramericana when it was available and only consumed Syzygium cumini when no other woods were available. Intermediate between these were in decreasing order of choice; Ailanthus excelsa, Azadirachta indica, Pinus roxburghii, Butea monosperma, Morus alba, Bauhinia variegata, Albizia lebbeck, Dalbergia sissoo, Heterophragma adenophyllum, Erythrina suberosa, Cassia fistula, Tectona grandis, Mangifera indica, Eucalyptus camaldulensis, Jacaranda mimosifolia and Bambusa bambos.
