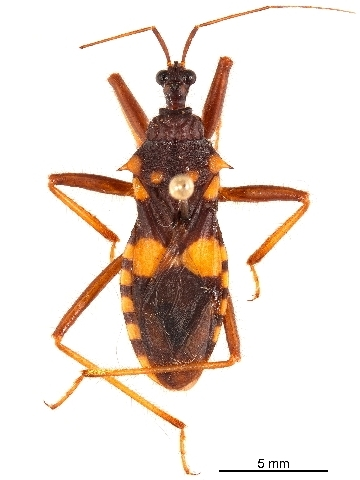

Scientific classification
- Domain: Eukaryota
- Kingdom: Animalia
- Phylum: Arthropoda
- Class: Insecta
- Order: Hemiptera
- Suborder: Heteroptera
- Family: Reduviidae
- Genus: Acanthaspis
- Species: A. quinquespinosa

Binomial name
- Acanthaspis quinquespinosa (Fabricius, 1781)

= Acanthaspis quinquespinosa =

Species of assassin bug

Acanthaspis quinquespinosa is a species of assassin bug found in India, Sri Lanka, Myanmar, Nepal and Tibet. It is a predator, and both nymphs and adults feed on termites, beetles, caterpillars and other insect prey.

== Description ==
The adult Acanthaspis quinquespinosa is a warningly-coloured, winged assassin bug that varies in appearance depending on the habitat in which it occurs. The overall colour is dark brown to black, with a reddish-brown abdomen and legs, and yellowish spots on the pronotum and fore-wings. There are two spines or prominent tubercles near the centre of the posterior lobe of the pronotum, and two long spines at the posterior margin; the scutellum bears a single spine at its apex. The insects are about 2 cm (0.8 in) long, with males being somewhat smaller than females. It is a common species; the colouring is similar to that of Acanthaspis angularis and Acanthaspis flavipes, but they can be distinguished by differences in the male genitalia.

== Distribution and habitat ==
Acanthaspis quinquespinosa is native to India, Sri Lanka, Nepal, Myanmar and Tibet. It occurs in a number of different habitats including tropical rainforest, scrub-jungle and semiarid agricultural areas. Among the insects on which it feeds are various crop pests and it has been found on sugarcane, cotton and tea. It is generally found near ground level, hiding underneath stones or the bark of fallen trees.

== Ecology ==
A. quinquespinosa is a ground-dwelling predator with a wide range of prey, and is mostly active at dawn and dusk. Crop pests on which it preys include the beet armyworm Laphygma exigua, the blister beetle Mylabris purtulata, the termite Odontotermes wallonensis, the cotton-stainer bugs Dysdercus koenigii and Oxycarenus laetus, the American bollworm Helicoverpa armigera, the leaf caterpillar Spodoptera litura, the pink bollworm Pectinophora gossypiella and the rice moth Corcyra cephalonica. Males have a shorter lifespan than females.

One of its prey species is the termite Coptotermes heimi; in feeding experiments it was found that when this termite was plentiful, the bug could kill and eat forty termites in a day.
