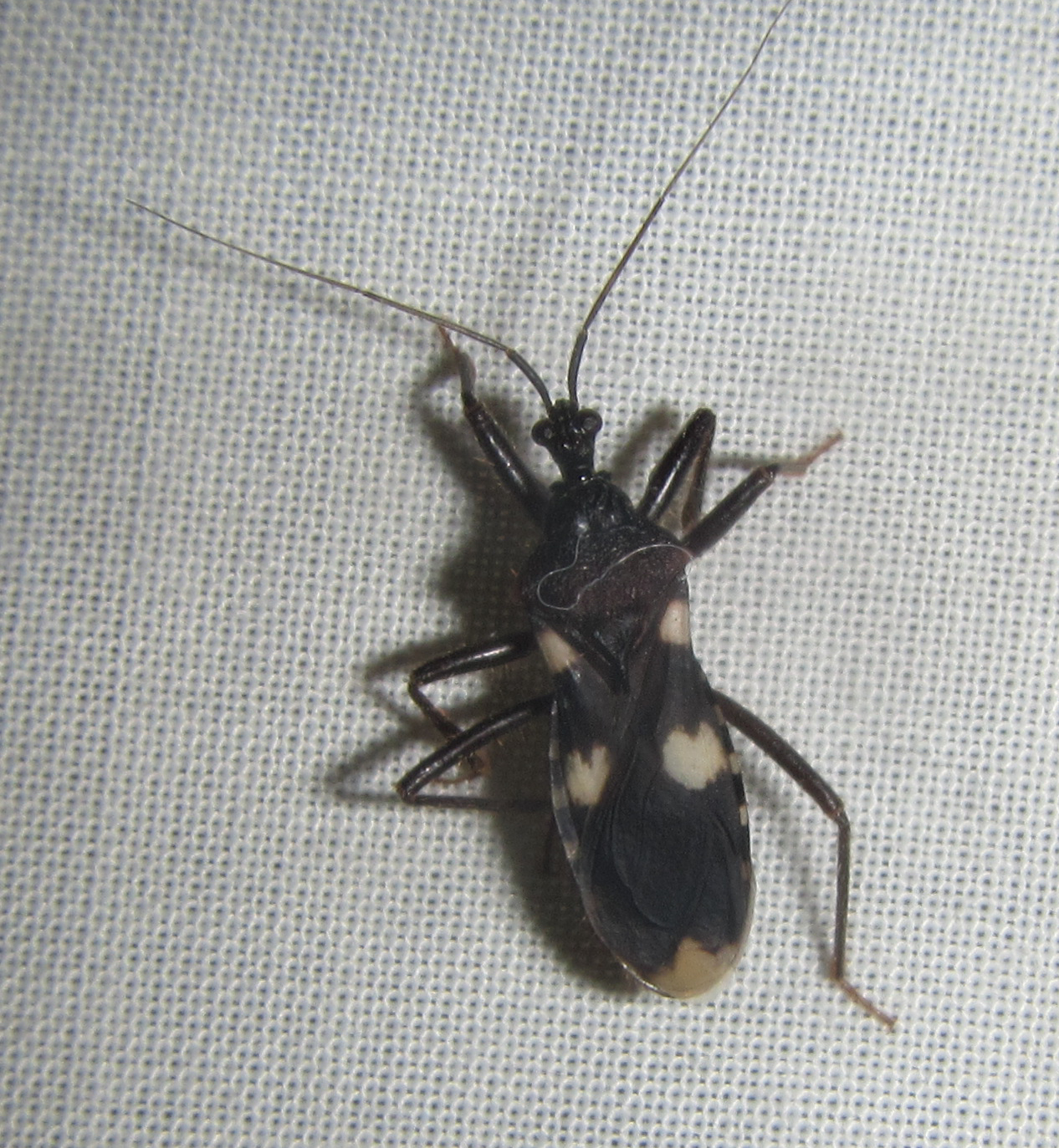

Scientific classification
- Kingdom: Animalia
- Phylum: Arthropoda
- Clade: Pancrustacea
- Class: Insecta
- Order: Hemiptera
- Suborder: Heteroptera
- Family: Reduviidae
- Genus: Acanthaspis
- Species: A. obscura

Binomial name
- Acanthaspis obscura Stål, 1855

= Acanthaspis obscura =

Species of assassin bug

Acanthaspis obscura is a species of assassin bug from tropical and subtropical Africa.

== Description ==
=== Adults ===
This insect grows up to 16 mm (0.63 in) in length. It has a dull black body with two white spots on each wing and a third dull honey-coloured spot at the tip of each wing. Some individuals have shorter wings.

== Distribution and habitat ==
Acanthaspis obscura occurs in tropical and subtropical Africa, including Ethiopia, Kenya, and South Africa. Adults are found living under bark and stones, as well as in termite mounds.

== Ecology ==
=== Nymphs ===
The nymphs cover themselves with the exoskeletons of their prey and other debris. They may be found in abandoned termite mounds along with adults, where they feed on ants.

=== Adults ===
Like other species in this family, Acanthaspis obscura is predatory. It may feed on insects much larger than itself and has a venomous fluid which paralyses and kills its prey within seconds of being bitten. It is more active at night than during the day and is attracted to light. Shorter-winged individuals are found living alongside full-winged individuals.

== Relationship with humans ==
This species may enter human homes, especially in rural areas, as it is attracted to light. It is known to bite people and is sometimes called the nagby (Afrikaans for night bee) by locals. A study in 1997 recorded at least 13 instances of humans being bitten by Acanthaspis obscura. These bites appear as a black spot surrounded by a white ring and swelling, often with a nearby cyst filled with dark, thick fluid.

The bite is painful due to the injected fluid, which is ordinarily used to hunt prey, and causes side effects in humans. These effects may last for months. The bite produces a numb, burning sensation lasting several hours and can cause swelling of the glands in the arms and legs for up to three days. It may also cause rapid breathing, heart palpitations, and welts all over the body.
