= Oxycarenus laetus =

Scientific classification
- Kingdom: Animalia
- Phylum: Arthropoda
- Class: Insecta
- Order: Hemiptera
- Suborder: Heteroptera
- Family: Lygaeidae
- Genus: Oxycarenus
- Species: O. laetus

Binomial name
- Oxycarenus laetus Kirby, 1891

Species of true bug

Oxycarenus laetus, commonly known as the dusky cotton bug, is a species of plant bug belonging to the family Lygaeidae. It is sometimes known as the Egyptian cotton stainer, and is found in southern Asia where it is a pest of cotton, okra and other crops.

== Distribution ==
Oxycarenus laetus is found in Iraq, Pakistan, India, Myanmar, Malaysia, Cambodia, Vietnam and Laos. In India and Pakistan it displaces Oxycarenus hyalinipennis on cotton; this species, commonly known as the cotton seed bug, occupies a similar niche in other cotton-growing regions of the world, with the exception of North America.

== Hosts ==
Oxycarenus laetus is a polyphagous insect, feeding on the seeds of a number of plants in the Malvaceae family. As well as being a pest of cotton (Gossypium spp.) crops, this insect is found on Abutilon indicum (Indian mallow), Sida acuta (common wireweed) and Thespesia populnea (portia tree). On these plants, populations are at their highest during the hotter months from March to July, and at their lowest between November and January. The insects seem to do best when the temperature is high and the humidity moderate. Other host plants on which this bug can be found include Hibiscus sabdariffa (roselle), Hibiscus vitifolius (tropical rose mallow) and Hibiscus esculentus (okra). Besides these plants on which the dusky cotton bug breeds, it feeds on a number of other plants and weeds including Deccan hemp, Dombeya burgessiae, Grewia asiatica, Melochia corchorifolia, Malva pusilla, Malva spp., Malvastrum spp. and Malvascus spp.

== Life cycle ==
The female Oxycarenus laetus lays a batch of cigar-shaped eggs between the lint and the calyx in half-open cotton bolls. The eggs hatch in between six and ten days, and the young develop through six nymphal stages before becoming fully grown in thirty to forty days.

== Ecology ==
Both adults and nymphs of Oxycarenus laetus feed on the developing seeds of the cotton plant. The seeds fail to develop properly and the lint gets stained. The predatory pirate bug Orius tantillus preys on the dusky cotton bug.
