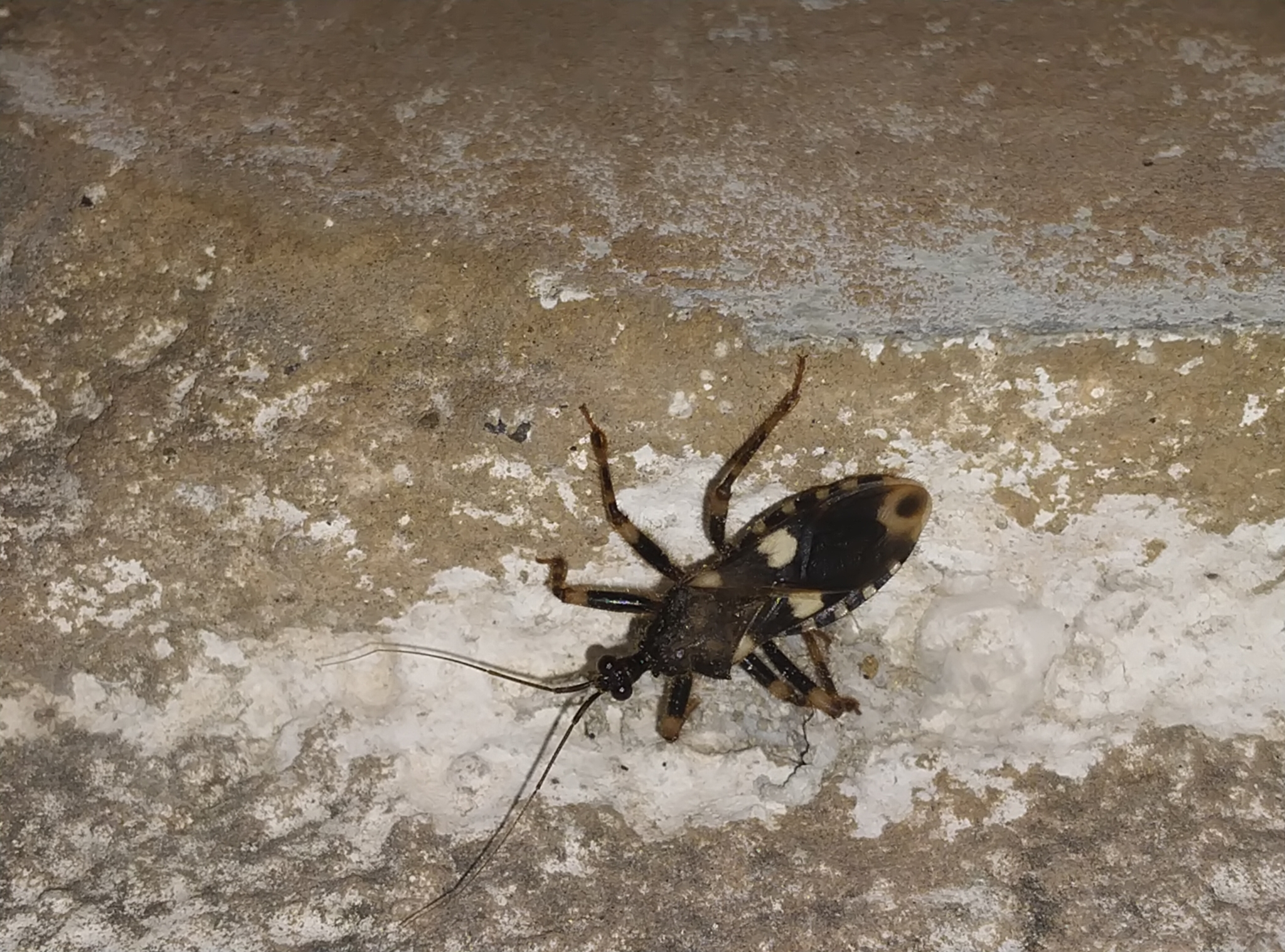

Scientific classification
- Domain: Eukaryota
- Kingdom: Animalia
- Phylum: Arthropoda
- Class: Insecta
- Order: Hemiptera
- Suborder: Heteroptera
- Family: Reduviidae
- Genus: Acanthaspis
- Species: A. siva

Binomial name
- Acanthaspis siva Distant, 1902

= Acanthaspis siva =

Species of true bug

Acanthaspis siva is a species of assassin bug. Nymphs of this species engage in the camouflaging behavior common to other species of Acanthaspis. In A. siva, camouflaging appears to reduce the chance that a nymph will be cannibalized by its coinstars.
