= Acanthaspis concinnula =

Scientific classification
- Kingdom: Animalia
- Phylum: Arthropoda
- Clade: Pancrustacea
- Class: Insecta
- Order: Hemiptera
- Suborder: Heteroptera
- Family: Reduviidae
- Genus: Acanthaspis
- Species: A. concinnula

Binomial name
- Acanthaspis concinnula Stål, 1863

Species of true bug

Acanthaspis concinnula is a species of assassin bug that has been reported as a specialist predator of the fire ant Solenopsis geminata.
