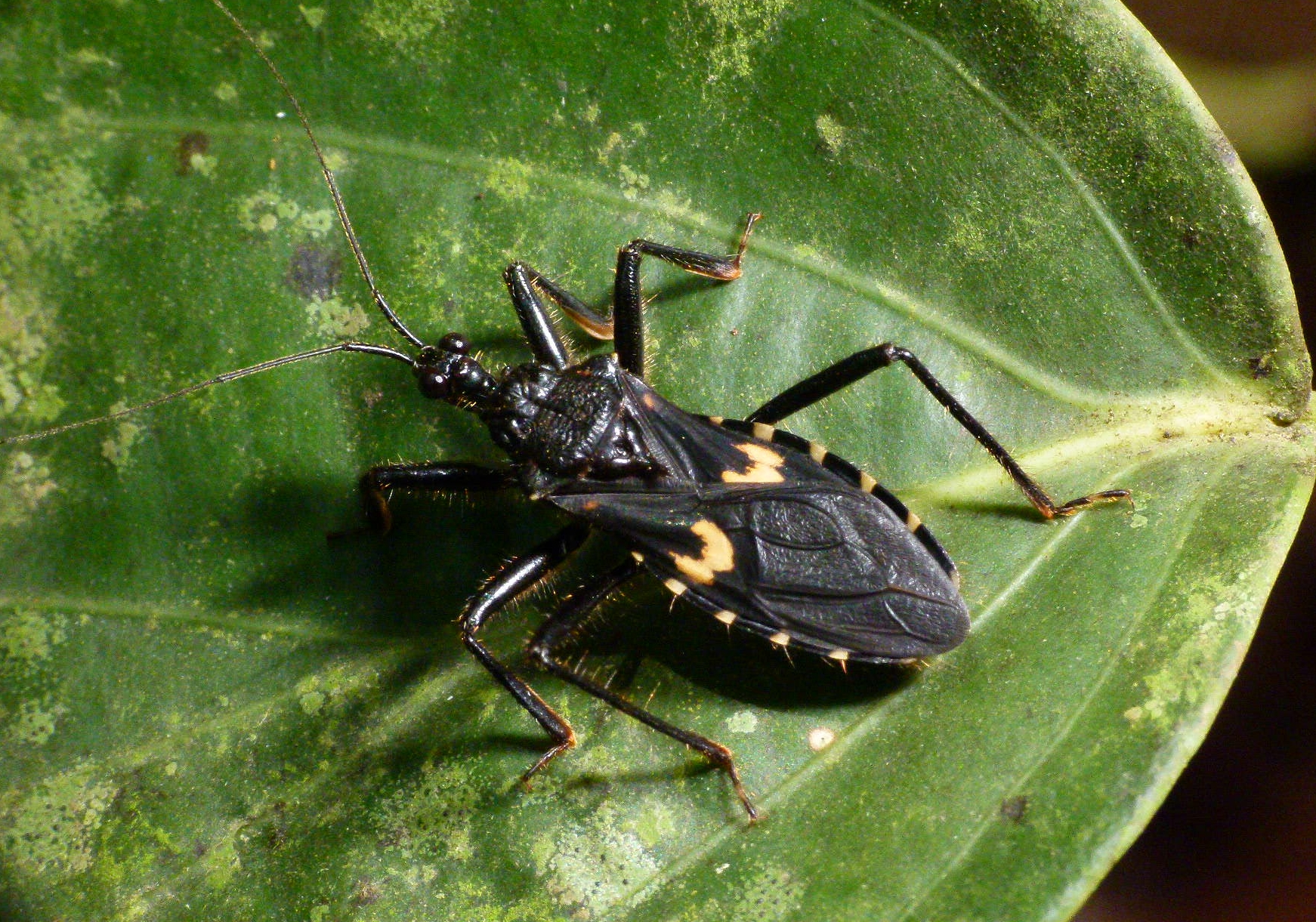
- Acanthaspis sp.

Scientific classification
- Kingdom: Animalia
- Phylum: Arthropoda
- Clade: Pancrustacea
- Class: Insecta
- Order: Hemiptera
- Suborder: Heteroptera
- Family: Reduviidae
- Genus: Acanthaspis; Amyot and Serville, 1843

= Acanthaspis =

Genus of true bugs

Acanthaspis is a genus of African and Asian assassin bugs, erected by Amyot & Serville in 1843. Members of the genus are known to disguise themselves by attaching bits of debris to aid in camouflage.

== Partial species list ==
- Acanthaspis alagiriensis Murugan & Livingstone, 1994
- Acanthaspis angularis Stål, 1859
- Acanthaspis annulicornis Stål, 1874
- Acanthaspis apicata Distant, 1903
- Acanthaspis biguttula Stål, 1863
- Acanthaspis bistillata Stål, 1858
- Acanthaspis bombayensis Distant, 1909
- Acanthaspis collaris Hsiao, 1976
- Acanthaspis carinata Murugan & Livingstone, 1994
- Acanthaspis cincticrus Stål, 1859
- Acanthaspis concinnula Stål, 1863
- Acanthaspis coprologus (Annandale, 1906)
- Acanthaspis coranodes Stål, 1874
- Acanthaspis flavipes Stål, 1855
- Acanthaspis fulviconnexa Cao, Redei, Li & Cai, 2014
- Acanthaspis fulvipes (Dallas, 1850)
- Acanthaspis fuscinervis Hsiao, 1976
- Acanthaspis genuculata Hsiao, 1976
- Acanthaspis gulo Stål, 1863
- Acanthaspis helluo Stål, 1863
- Acanthaspis immodesta Bergroth, 1914
- Acanthaspis laoensis Distant, 1919
- Acanthaspis lineatipes Reuter, 1881
- Acanthaspis livingstonei Vennison & Ambrose, 1988
- Acanthaspis luteipes Walker, 1873
- Acanthaspis maculata Distant, 1910
- Acanthaspis megaspila Walker, 1873
- Acanthaspis micrographa Walker, 1873
- Acanthaspis minutum Livingstone & Murugan, 1988
- Acanthaspis nigricans Ambrose, 1994
- Acanthaspis nigripes Livingstone & Murugan, 1988
- Acanthaspis obscura Stål, 1855
- Acanthaspis octoguttata Cao, Redei, Li & Cai, 2014
- Acanthaspis pedestris Stål, 1863
- Acanthaspis pernobilis Reuter, 1881
- Acanthaspis petax Stål, 1865
- Acanthaspis philomanmariae Vennison & Ambrose, 1988
- Acanthaspis picta Hsiao, 1976
- Acanthaspis pustulata Stål, 1874
- Acanthaspis quinquespinosa (Fabricius, 1781)
- Acanthaspis rama Distant, 1902
- Acanthaspis ruficeps Hsiao, 1976
- Acanthaspis rugulosa Stål, 1863
- Acanthaspis sexguttata (Fabricius, 1775)
- Acanthaspis siruvanii Livingstone & Murugan, 1988
- Acanthaspis siva Distant, 1902
- Acanthaspis subrufa Distant, 1903
- Acanthaspis tavoyana Distant, 1903
- Acanthaspis tergeminia Burmeister, 1835
- Acanthaspis trimaculata Reuter, 1887
- Acanthaspis unifasciata (Wolff, 1804)
- Acanthaspis variegata Distant, 1874
- Acanthaspis westermanii Reuter, 1881
