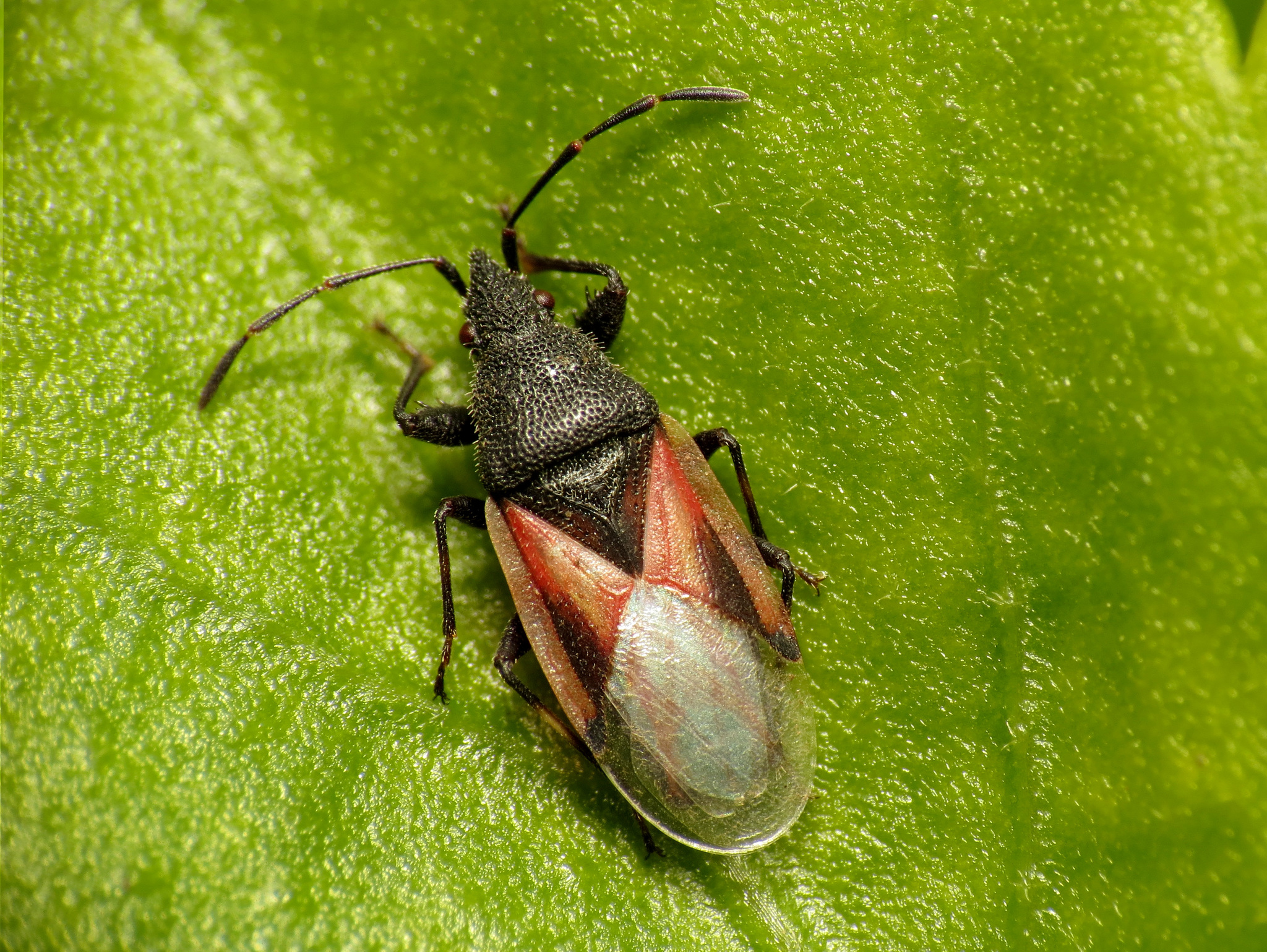
- Adult

Scientific classification
- Kingdom: Animalia
- Phylum: Arthropoda
- Class: Insecta
- Order: Hemiptera
- Suborder: Heteroptera
- Family: Lygaeidae
- Genus: Oxycarenus
- Species: O. lavaterae

Binomial name
- Oxycarenus lavaterae (Fabricius, 1787)

Synonyms
- Acanthia lavaterae Fabricius, 1787

= Oxycarenus lavaterae =

Species of true bug

Oxycarenus lavaterae, common name lime seed bug, is a species of ground bug of the family Lygaeidae, subfamily Oxycareninae.

== Distribution ==
Historically it was mainly found in the Mediterranean Basin, including North Africa, but beginning in the 1970s, it has been found further north, into the Benelux counties, Central Europe and Eastern Europe.

== Description ==
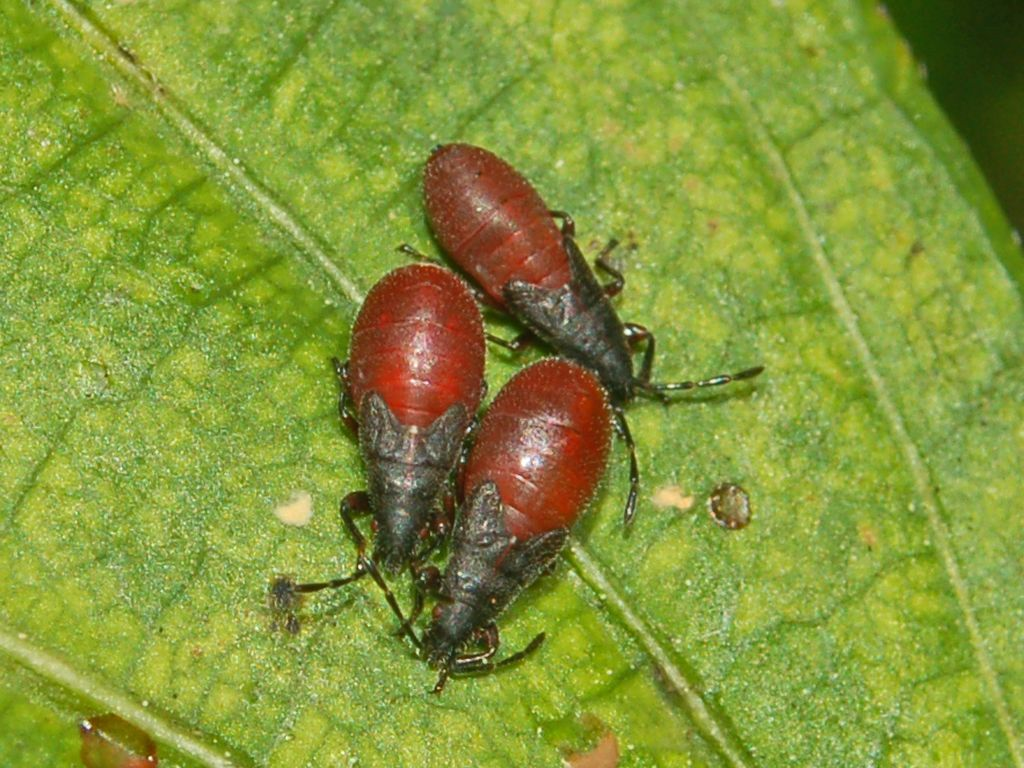
Oxycarenus lavaterae - Nymph

Oxycarenus lavaterae can reach a length of 4.5–5.4 millimetres (0.18–0.21 in) in adult females, and 4.2–5 millimetres (0.17–0.20 in) in males. Adult bugs are mostly red, white and black colored. The head, the entire prothorax, the scutellum and the antennae are black. The upper part of the abdomen is brick-red, while the connexivum is blackish. The front wings are colorless and transparent and reach the top of the abdomen or are a little longer. The nymphs can be easily recognized by their black head and the red-colored abdomen. The wing pads of the nymphs are completely black.

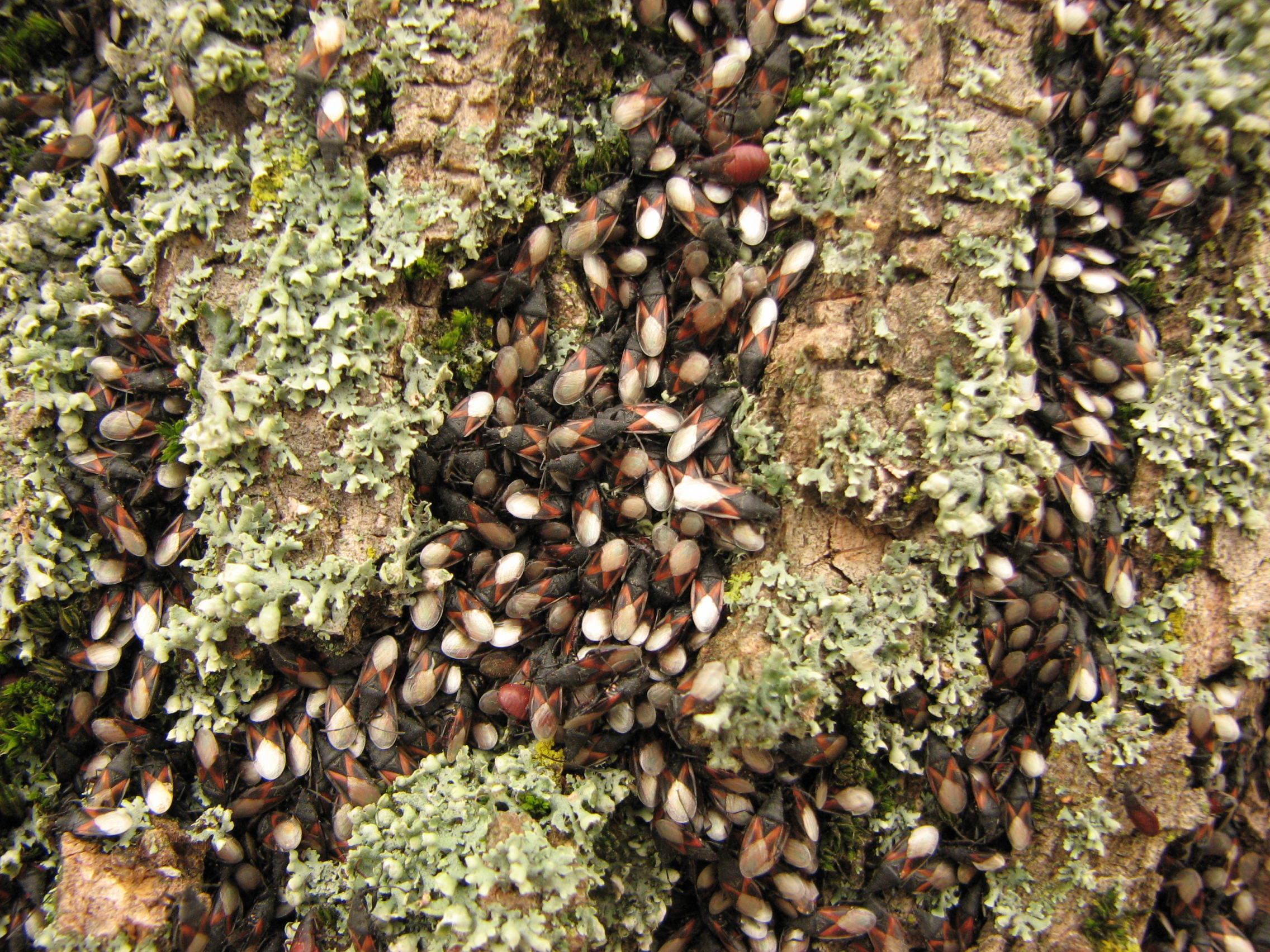
A colony of O. lavaterae hybernating on Tilia sp.

== Biology ==
There are usually two annual generations. These bugs are found on and feed upon plants in the family Malvaceae, such as Lavatera (hence the species name), Althea, Hibiscus, and Malva. They are considered an invasive pest in some countries.

In warmer countries Oxycarenus lavaterae hibernates as adults. These bugs form large aggregates on trunks and branches of the trees to overwinter, typically on lime trees (Tilia)(Tilia americana, Tilia cordata, Tilia parviflora, Tilia platyphyllos), less frequently on other plants (Populus, Platanus, Aesculus hippocastanum).
