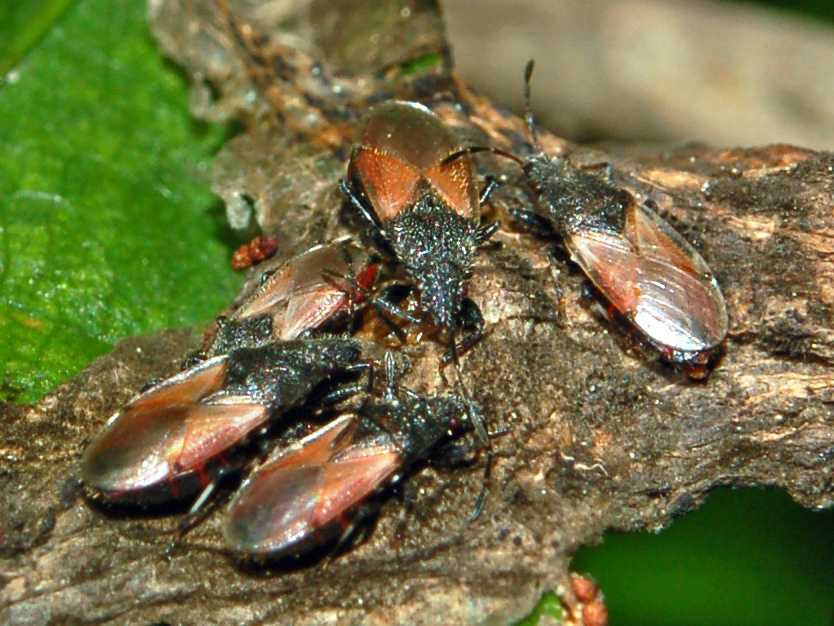
- Oxycarenus lavaterae

Scientific classification
- Kingdom: Animalia
- Phylum: Arthropoda
- Class: Insecta
- Order: Hemiptera
- Suborder: Heteroptera
- Family: Lygaeidae
- Subfamily: Oxycareninae
- Genus: Oxycarenus; Fieber, 1837

= Oxycarenus =

Genus of true bugs

Oxycarenus is a genus of ground bugs belonging to the family Lygaeidae, subfamily Oxycareninae. There are approximately fifty-five described species of Oxycarenus, and a number are documented as important crop pests.

== Species ==
Selected species:

- Oxycarenus bicolor
- Oxycarenus hyalinipennis (A. Costa, 1843), cotton pest
- Oxycarenus laetus Kirby
- Oxycarenus lavaterae (Fabricius, 1787)
- Oxycarenus longiceps Wagner, 1955
- Oxycarenus lugubris
- Oxycarenus modestus (Fallén, 1829)
- Oxycarenus pallens (Herrich-Schäffer, 1850)
