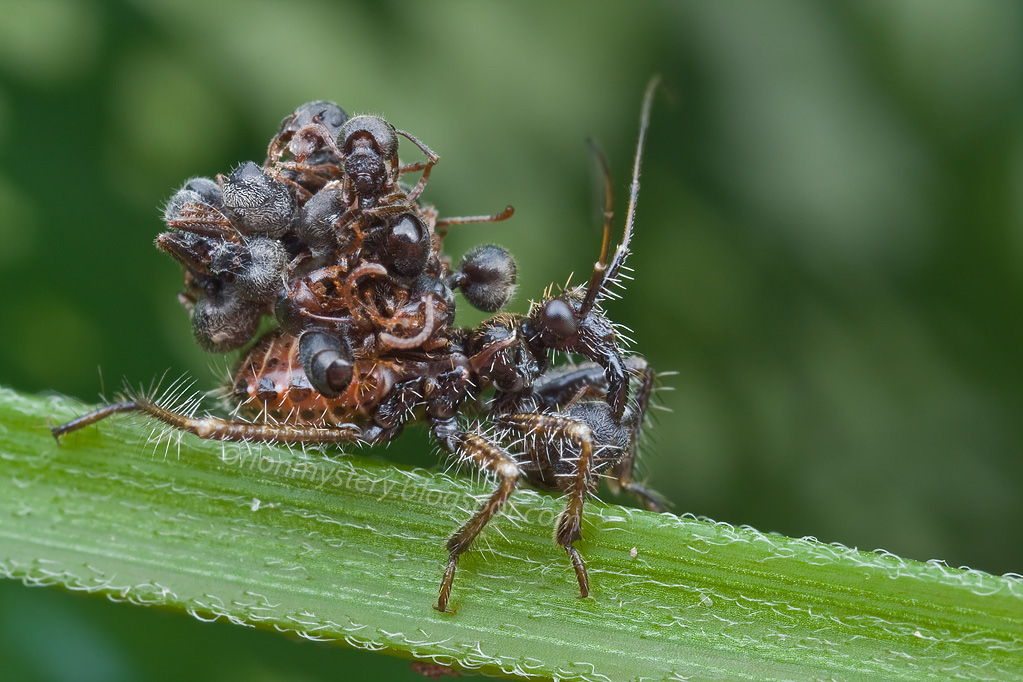

Scientific classification
- Kingdom: Animalia
- Phylum: Arthropoda
- Clade: Pancrustacea
- Class: Insecta
- Order: Hemiptera
- Suborder: Heteroptera
- Family: Reduviidae
- Genus: Acanthaspis
- Species: A. petax

Binomial name
- Acanthaspis petax Stål, 1865

= Acanthaspis petax =

Species of true bug

Acanthaspis petax is a species of assassin bug that preys primarily on ants, but also on a variety of small insects, such as flies, small grasshoppers and beetles. The nymphs of this species create a pile of ant carcasses on their backs for camouflage. The adults do not use camouflage and are coloured with a red and black pattern.

This insect lives in East Africa near Lake Victoria, in countries including Uganda, Kenya, and Tanzania. It has also been seen in west Asian countries.

== Habitat ==
Acanthaspis petax lives in the savanna in hidden habitats such as cracks in the ground, cracks in mud walls, and deserted fungus-growing termite mounds.

== Camouflage ==
=== Corpse Camouflage ===
Acanthaspis petax nymphs create a large mound on their backs consisting predominantly of ant carcasses, but other small insect corpses and bits of plants are often included. This is called masking (when an animal applies materials from the environment to its body), more specifically this is a type of masking called corpse camouflage. The nymphs use this camouflage to hide from predators and aid in the capture of their prey.

To build its mask Acanthaspis petax must first capture its prey. Once captured Acanthaspis petax injects the prey with digestive enzymes and drinks the dissolved tissues, leaving an empty exoskeleton behind. This exoskeleton is fixed to the back of Acanthaspis petax using adhesive threads it secretes from secretory hairs on its abdomen.

How exactly this carcass mound camouflages Acanthaspis petax is still up for debate as little research has been done on the topic. One theory is camouflage by bizarre forms: the insect may attach so many items to its back that it is unrecognizable to predators. Not camouflaging as something else but simply disrupting its image. Another idea is that Acanthaspis petax is camouflaging itself as a swarm of ants. Interestingly, ants are not the only organisms Acanthaspis petax preys on, but they are the main ones it builds its mask out of. This is possibly because salticid spiders are a major predator of Acanthaspis petax but not of ants. In fact, spiders may avoid a cluster of ants in fear of being swarmed by them. Finally, it has been suggested that this is a type of olfactory camouflage, meaning the smell of the ants would mask that of the insect, however, this theory has not been studied.

What is known is that masked bugs get preyed upon much less than naked bugs by visually oriented predators, leading to the conclusion that the camouflage is at least partially visual.

=== Other Camouflage ===
The nymphs also cover themselves in sand or soil particles. This "dust coat" may be a form of olfactory camouflage, masking the smell of Acanthaspis petax allowing it to be undetected by its prey and capture it more easily.

The nymphs are active during the day and use camouflage heavily. The adults are active at night and therefore have less of a need for camouflage and do not use it.

== Feeding ==
Acanthaspis petax stalks its prey, until it gets close enough to ambush the prey. It then pierces the prey with its syringe-like proboscis. Paralyzing saliva and digestive enzymes are sent down the proboscis into the prey. Once the prey is extra-corporeally digested Acanthaspis petax sucks the liquefied tissues up the proboscis leaving only the exoskeleton of the prey behind.

== Behaviours ==
When grabbed by a predator Acanthaspis petax can release its body from its mask and run away or hide, leaving behind only a ball of ant carcasses. If a nymph is caught, it plays dead and will not move for many minutes even if it is released.

Acanthaspis petax generally moves infrequently and in short bursts. This type of movement enhances the effectiveness of the camouflage.

Nymphs can go many days without food or water making them well adapted to their seemingly unattractive habitat.
