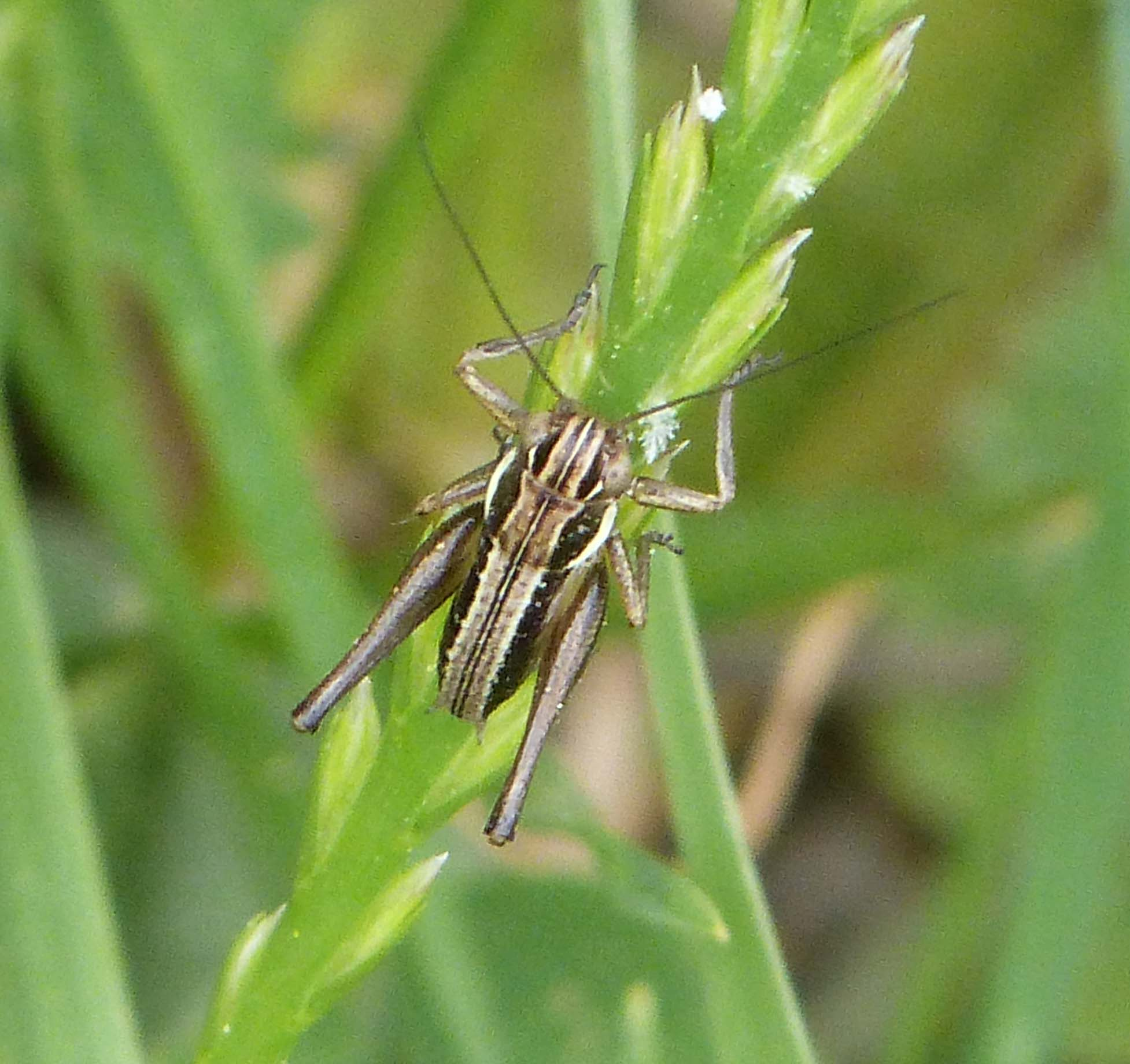
- Pterolepsis cf. spoliata

Scientific classification
- Domain: Eukaryota
- Kingdom: Animalia
- Phylum: Arthropoda
- Class: Insecta
- Order: Orthoptera
- Suborder: Ensifera
- Family: Tettigoniidae
- Tribe: Platycleidini
- Genus: Pterolepis; Rambur, 1838

Synonyms
- Scirtobaenus Pantel, 1886

= Pterolepis (bush cricket) =

Genus of cricket-like animals

Pterolepis is a genus of bush crickets in the subfamily Tettigoniinae and tribe Platycleidini erected by Jules Pierre Rambur in 1838. The known distribution is from North Africa and the Iberian Peninsula.

== Species ==
The Orthoptera Species File lists the following accepted species:

1. Pterolepis adolphorum (Galvagni, 1988)
2. Pterolepis algerica (Uvarov, 1935)
3. Pterolepis augustini (Galvagni, 2001)
4. Pterolepis berberica (Galvagni, 1989)
5. Pterolepis bidens (Uvarov, 1924)
6. Pterolepis claudiae (Galvagni, 1988)
7. Pterolepis cordubensis Bolívar, 1900
8. Pterolepis elymica Galvagni & Massa, 1980
9. Pterolepis galitana (Uvarov, 1942)
10. Pterolepis gessardi Bonnet, 1886
11. Pterolepis grallata (Pantel, 1886)
12. Pterolepis kabylica (Galvagni & Fontana, 2000)
13. Pterolepis korsakovi (Uvarov, 1942)
14. Pterolepis lagrecai (Fontana & Massa, 2004)
15. Pterolepis lusitanica (Bolívar, 1900)
16. Pterolepis maroccana (Bolívar, 1905)
17. Pterolepis maura (Bonnet, 1886)
18. Pterolepis moralesi (Galvagni, 1988)
19. Pterolepis pedata Costa, 1882
20. Pterolepis pieltaini (Morales-Agacino, 1940)
21. Pterolepis pityusensis Barranco, 2014
22. Pterolepis spoliata Rambur, 1838 - type species (P. spoliata spoliata: one of 8 subspecies)
23. Pterolepis theryana Uvarov, 1927
