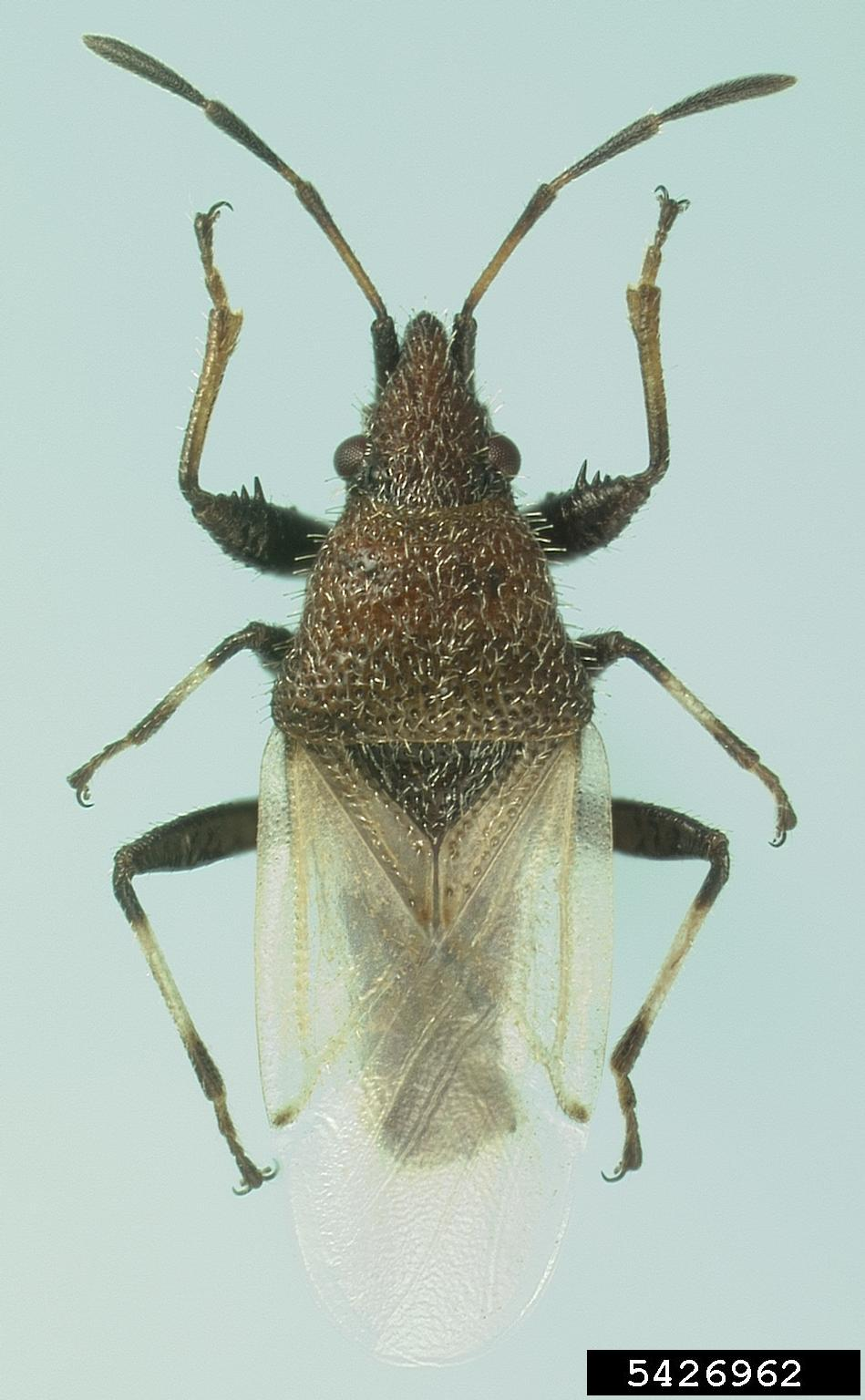
- Adult

Scientific classification
- Domain: Eukaryota
- Kingdom: Animalia
- Phylum: Arthropoda
- Class: Insecta
- Order: Hemiptera
- Suborder: Heteroptera
- Family: Lygaeidae
- Genus: Oxycarenus
- Species: O. hyalinipennis

Binomial name
- Oxycarenus hyalinipennis (A. Costa, 1843)

Synonyms
- Aphanus hyalinipennis Costa; Aphanus tardus var. hyalipennis Costa, 1847; Cymus cincticornis Walker, 1870; Oxycarenus cruralis Stål, 1856; Oxycarenus leucopterus Fieber, 1852

= Oxycarenus hyalinipennis =

Species of true bug

Oxycarenus hyalinipennis, common name cotton seed bug, is a species of plant bug belonging to the family Lygaeidae, subfamily Oxycareninae.

== Distribution ==
This widespread species can be found in Southern Europe (Bosnia and Herzegovina, Bulgaria, Croatia, France, Greece, Italy, Portugal, Spain, former Yugoslavia and Albania), in the Afrotropical realm, in the Neotropical realm, and in the Oriental realm.

While historically it has been documented as an important pest of cotton in the Mediterranean region and in coastal Africa, it is an invasive species whose range has expanded over the last three decades to include islands of the Caribbean region.

== Description ==
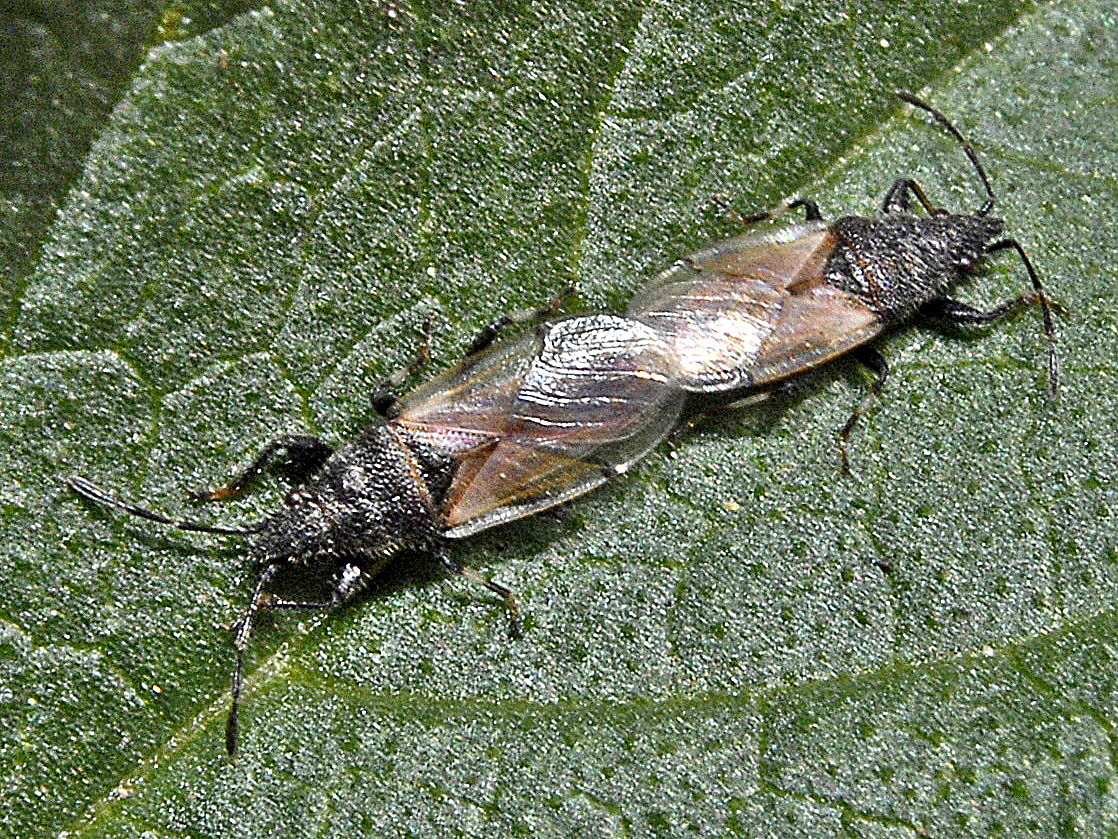
Mating couple

Oxycarenus hyalinipennis can reach a length of about 3.8 mm in males, of 4.3 mm in females. Therefore, males are slightly smaller than females. Body of these bugs is black with translucent wings. Head is black, with brownish-black antennae. The second antennal segment usually is partially pale yellow. Pronotum is blackish-brown. Corium is usually yellowish-whitish and hyaline. Femora are black, while tibiae are brown with a yellow-white band.

Nymphs have pink to red abdomen.

== Biology ==
This species may have three to four generations per year. Females of these bugs lay about twenty eggs. This species goes through five nymphal stages. A generation lasts about twenty days.

It is a polyphagous insect, and it has been documented as a prominent pest upon the following genera within family Malvaceae: Abutilon, Cola, Eriodendron, Gossypium, Malva, Sphaeralcea, Hibiscus, Pavonia, Sida, Dombeya, Sterculia and Triumfetta. Of these, Gossypium appears to be the preferred host, but significant pest presence on okra has also been reported.
