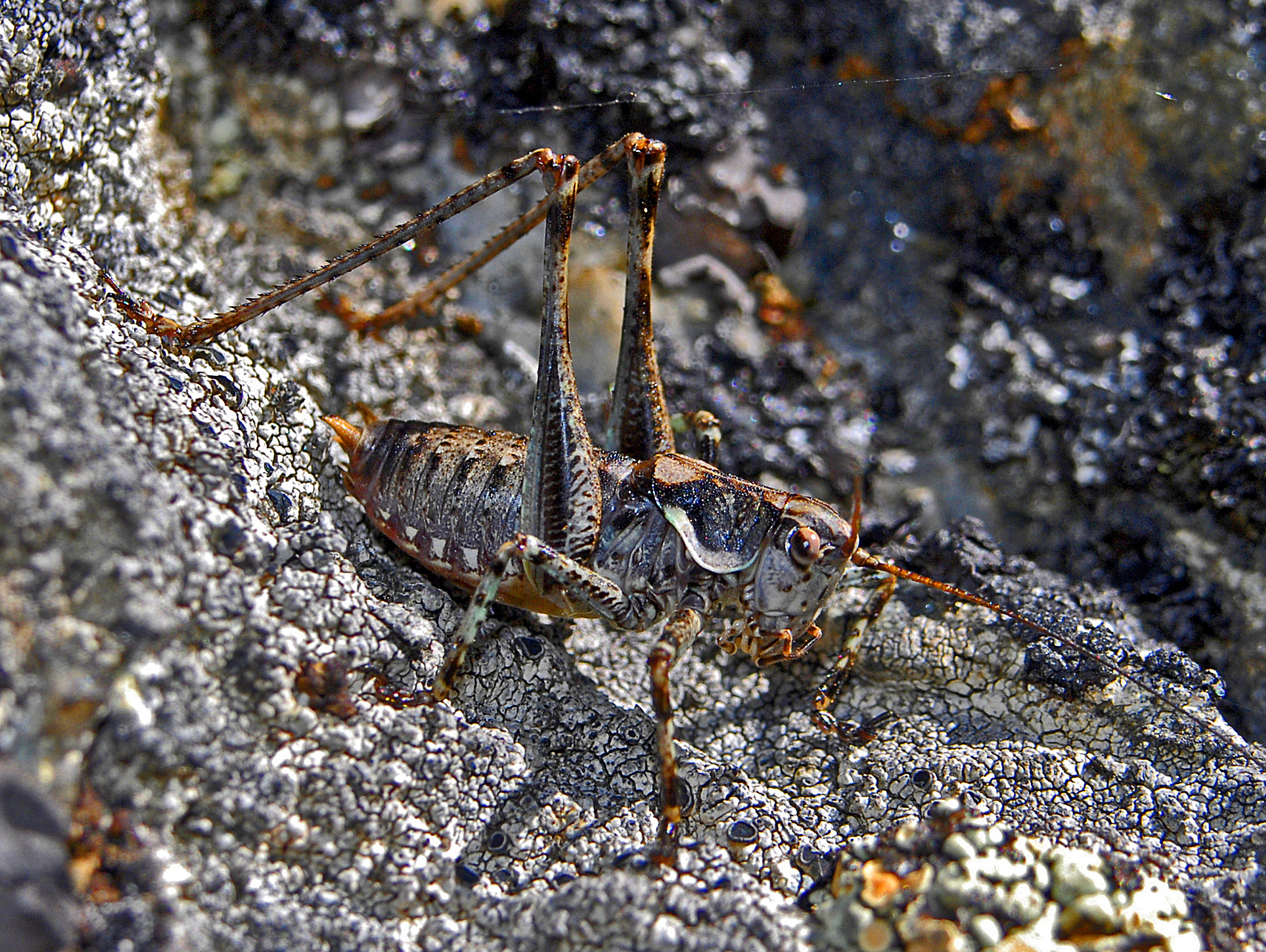
- Antaxius pedestris pedestris, male
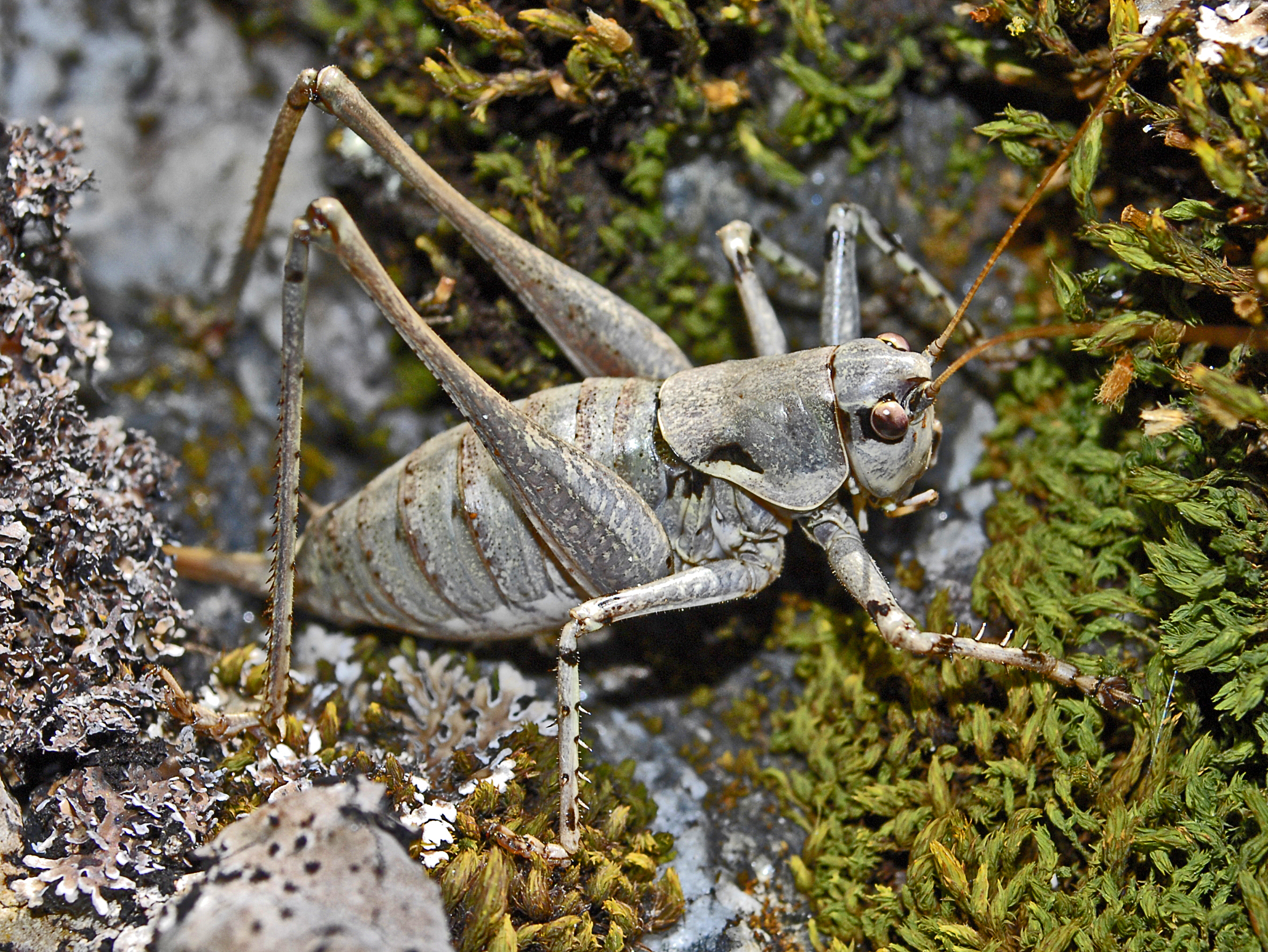
- Antaxius pedestris pedestris, female

Conservation status
- Least Concern (IUCN 3.1)

Scientific classification
- Kingdom: Animalia
- Phylum: Arthropoda
- Clade: Pancrustacea
- Class: Insecta
- Order: Orthoptera
- Suborder: Ensifera
- Family: Tettigoniidae
- Genus: Antaxius
- Species: A. pedestris

Binomial name
- Antaxius pedestris (Fabricius, 1787)

Synonyms
- Chopardius pedestris (Fabricius, 1787)

= Antaxius pedestris =

Species of cricket-like animal

Close-Up of Antaxius pedestris

Antaxius pedestris is a species of "bush crickets" belonging to the family Tettigoniidae. It was originally described by Johan Christian Fabricius under the scientific name of Locusta pedestris.

== Subspecies ==
Subspecies include:

- Antaxius pedestris apuanus Nadig, 1958 - occurs in Italy, Austria and Switzerland
- Antaxius pedestris pedestris (Fabricius, 1787) - occurs in France, Italy, Austria and Switzerland

== Distribution ==
This species is present in Pyrenees of Spain, the northwestern part of Portugal and in the western and southern Alps of Austria, France, Italy and Switzerland.

== Habitat ==
It prefers warm habitats in mountainous and semi-mountainous areas with high vegetation and low bushes, at an elevation up to 2,000 metres (6,600 ft) above sea level.

== Description ==
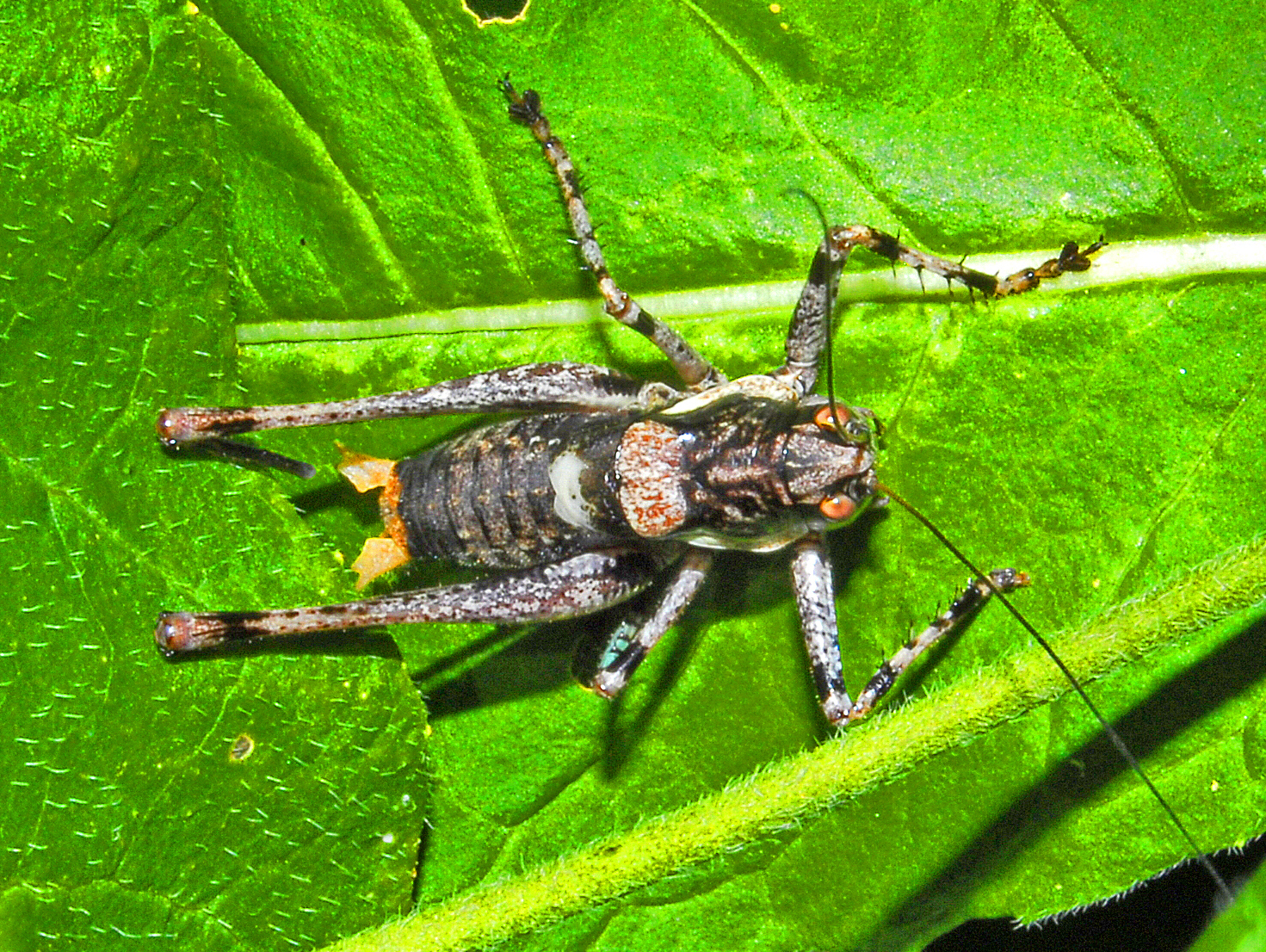
Male, dorsal view

Antaxius pedestris recording

Antaxius pedestris can reach a length of about 15–23 millimetres (0.59–0.91 in). Its ovipositor is slightly shorter than the body, it reaches about 13–18 millimetres (0.51–0.71 in).

The basic color of the body is dark brown, gray brown or dark gray with light whitish or yellow to light gray drawings. Pronotum is tinged with white on the lateral margins. Abdomen is long, thick and strong. Wings are very short in the females, while in males they protrude 3–4 mm out from under the pronotum.

Cerci of the males are unusual. They are whitish, flattened and internally toothed. All pairs of the powerful legs bear small spines on the lower part.

== Biology ==
Adults can be found from July to October. They feed on plants and insects, mainly small locusts. Eggs are laid in the ground.
