= Acanthaspis pedestris =

Scientific classification
- Kingdom: Animalia
- Phylum: Arthropoda
- Clade: Pancrustacea
- Class: Insecta
- Order: Hemiptera
- Suborder: Heteroptera
- Family: Reduviidae
- Genus: Acanthaspis
- Species: A. pedestris

Binomial name
- Acanthaspis pedestris Stål, 1863

Species of true bug

Acanthaspis pedestris is a species of assassin bug that functions as a beneficial insect in agricultural systems.
