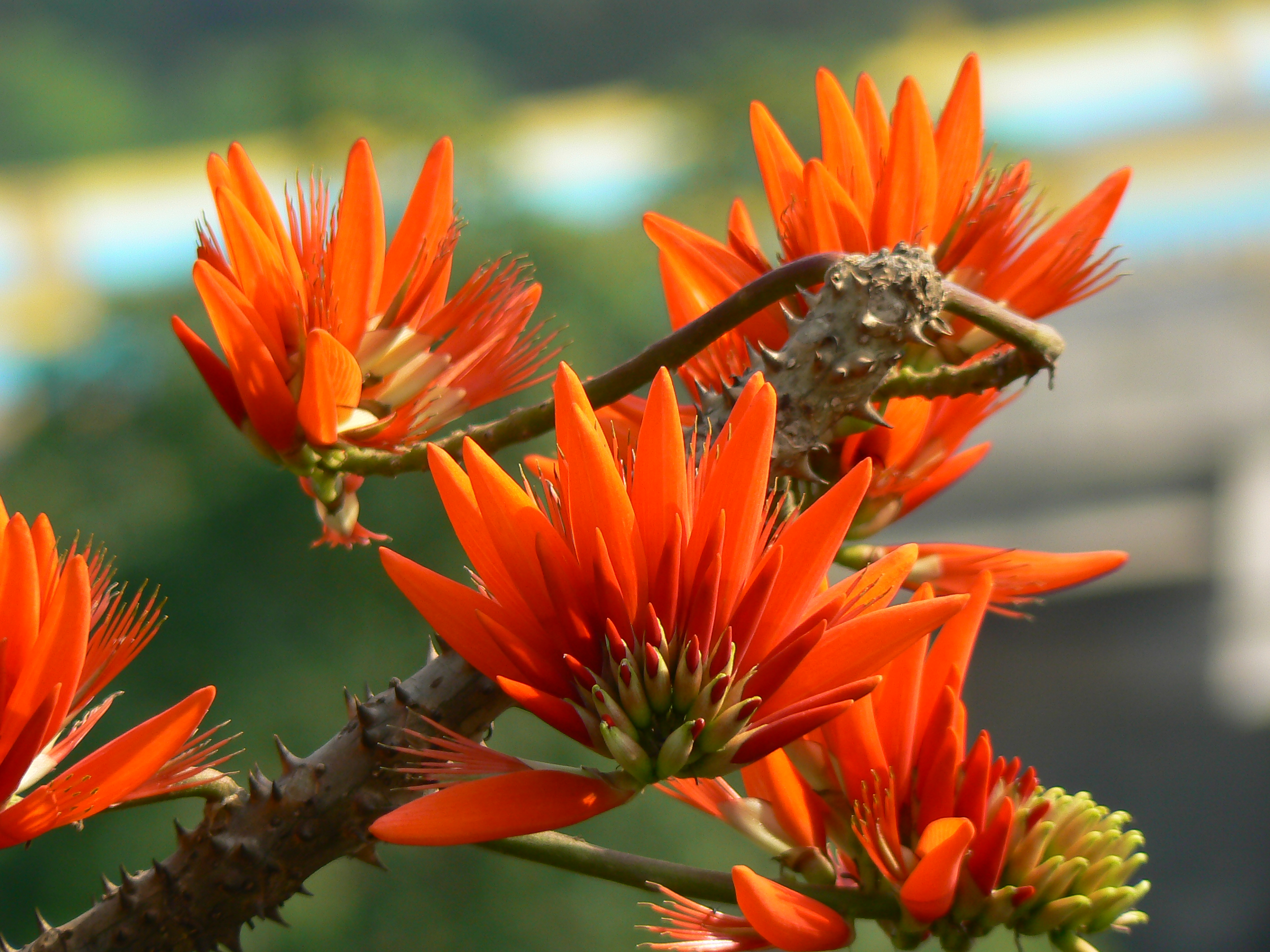
- Flowers
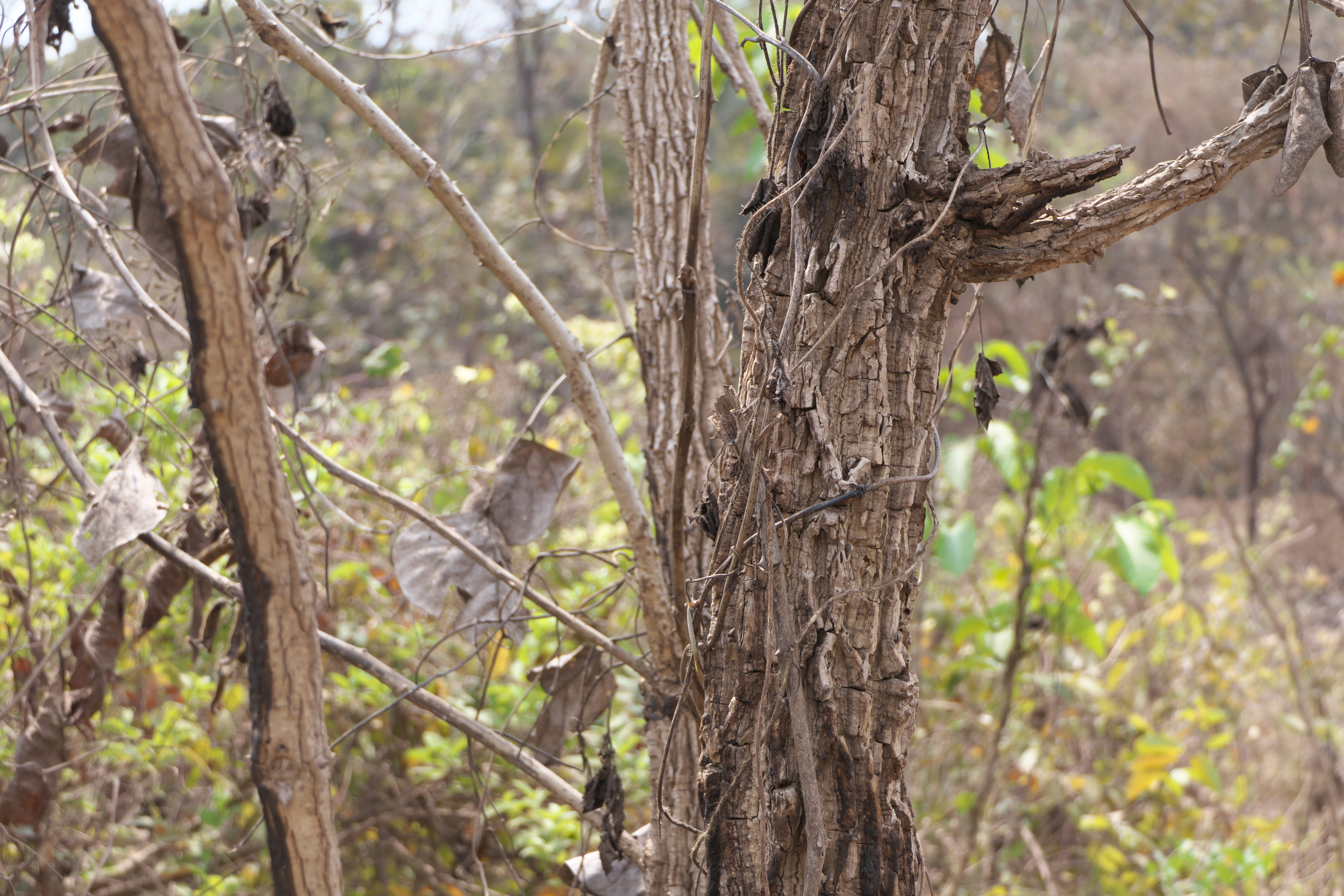
- Trunk

Scientific classification
- Kingdom: Plantae
- Clade: Embryophytes
- Clade: Tracheophytes
- Clade: Angiosperms
- Clade: Eudicots
- Clade: Rosids
- Order: Fabales
- Family: Fabaceae
- Subfamily: Faboideae
- Genus: Erythrina
- Species: E. suberosa

Binomial name
- Erythrina suberosa Roxb.

Synonyms
- List: Corallodendron suberosum (Roxb.) Kuntze; Erythrina alba Roxb. ex Wight & Arn.; Erythrina bisetosa Griff.; Erythrina glabrescens (Prain) R.Parker; Erythrina hamiltoniana Steud.; Erythrina maxima Roxb. ex Wight & Arn.; Erythrina nahasuta Buch.-Ham. ex Wall.; Erythrina reniformis Buch.-Ham.; Erythrina stricta var. suberosa (Roxb.) Niyomdham; Erythrina sublobata Roxb.; Micropteryx suberosa (Roxb.) Walp.; Micropteryx sublobata (Roxb.) Walp.

= Erythrina suberosa =

Species of flowering plant

Erythrina suberosa, the corky coral tree, is a species of flowering plant in the family Fabaceae. It is native to the Indian Subcontinent (except Assam), Southeast Asia (except Laos), and Peninsular Malaysia. Due to its showy flowers and habit of flowering most of the year, it is often planted as an ornamental or street tree. Although the flowers can be used to make a refreshing drink, the seeds are poisonous.
