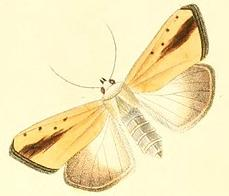

Scientific classification
- Kingdom: Animalia
- Phylum: Arthropoda
- Clade: Pancrustacea
- Class: Insecta
- Order: Lepidoptera
- Superfamily: Noctuoidea
- Family: Nolidae
- Genus: Pardoxia
- Species: P. graellsii

Binomial name
- Pardoxia graellsii (Feisthamel, 1837)

Synonyms
- Acontia graellsii Feisthamel, 1837; Xanthodes graellsi (Feisthamel, 1837); Xanthodes innocens Walker, 1858; Xanthodes fimbriata Walker, 1865

= Pardoxia graellsii =

Species of moth

Pardoxia graellsii, the yellow drab, is a moth species in the family Nolidae first described by Joachim François Philibert Feisthamel in 1837. It was described from Spain, and is found in Southern Europe France, Spain, but has been described from Eurasia such as Turkey, Iraq, Saudi Arabia, Yemen, plus continental Africa such as Ethiopia, Gambia, Ghana, Malawi, Mauritania, Nigeria, Sierra Leone, South Africa, Zimbabwe, and islands Cape Verde, Comoros, Réunion, Madagascar, Mauritius, plus further, such as China, India, Myanmar.

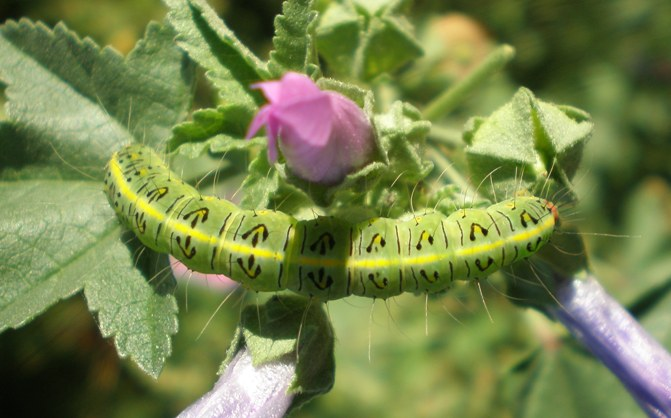
Larva

Larvae have been recorded feeding on Althaea officinalis, Lavatera olbia and Gossypium species.
