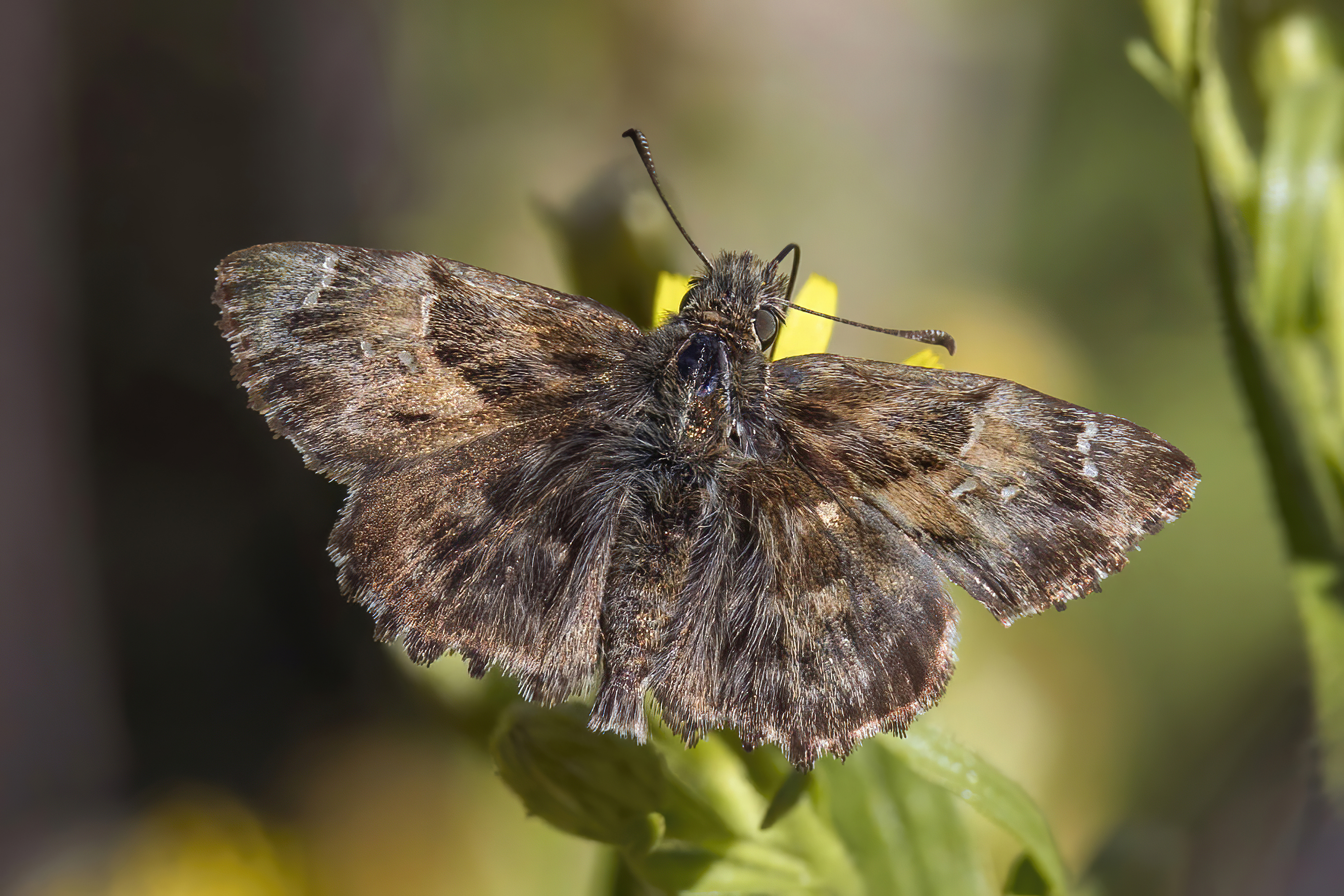
- in Corfu, Greece
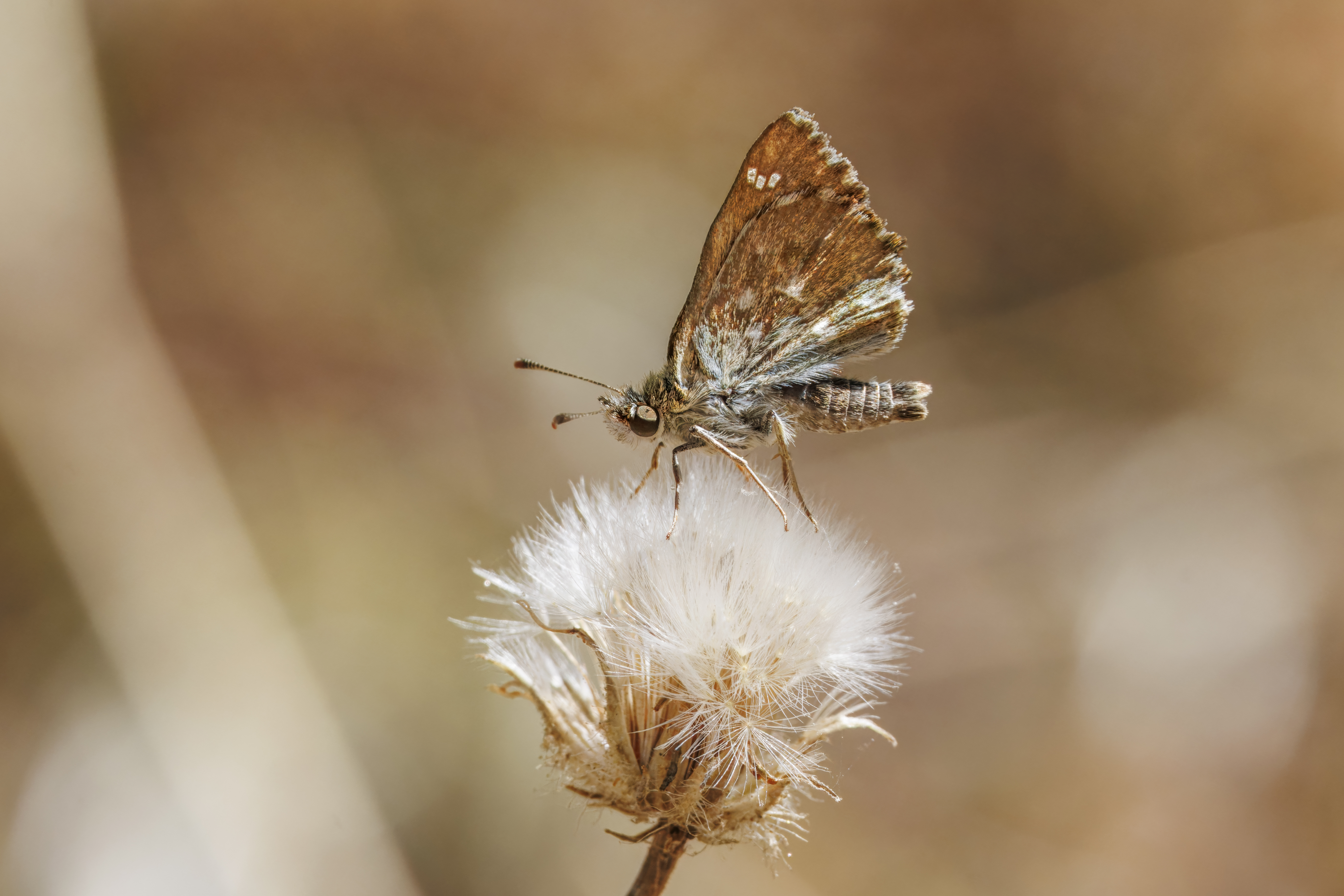
- in Turkey

Scientific classification
- Kingdom: Animalia
- Phylum: Arthropoda
- Clade: Pancrustacea
- Class: Insecta
- Order: Lepidoptera
- Family: Hesperiidae
- Genus: Carcharodus
- Species: C. alceae

Binomial name
- Carcharodus alceae (Esper, 1780)

Synonyms
- Papilio alceae Esper, 1780; Papilio malvarum Hoffmannsegg, 1804; Carcharodus swinhoei wissmanni Warnecke, 1934

= Carcharodus alceae =

Mallow skipper

Species of butterfly

Carcharodus alceae, commonly known as the mallow skipper, is a species of butterfly of the family Hesperiidae.

== Taxonomy ==
The scientific Latin species name alceae refers to the host plants Althaea, which, in turn, are named after the ancient Greek poet Alcaeus of Mytilene. Subspecies include:

- Carcharodus alceae alceae - Europe, North Africa
- Carcharodus alceae swinhoei Watson, 1893 - Afghanistan, north-western India
- Carcharodus alceae wissmanni Warnecke, 1934 - Yemen

== Description ==
Carcharodus alceae has a wingspan of 28–32 mm. The background colour of the forewings is pinkish brown, with approximately square brown markings, short, white transverse stripes running from the edge and clear patches on the discal area. Hindwings are brownish or grey-brown, with some prominent brighter spots on the underside. Males are without hair tuft on forewings underside. Antennae have cherry brown tips.

The eggs are yellowish and hemispherical and the surface is covered with elongated warts, connected each other with low ribs. The egg has a prickly appearance. In the course of the development they turn red. The caterpillars can reach a length of about 23 millimetres (0.91 in). They are dark gray, covered with small white dots and short, white hairs. The head is black with yellow spots, separated by black stripes.

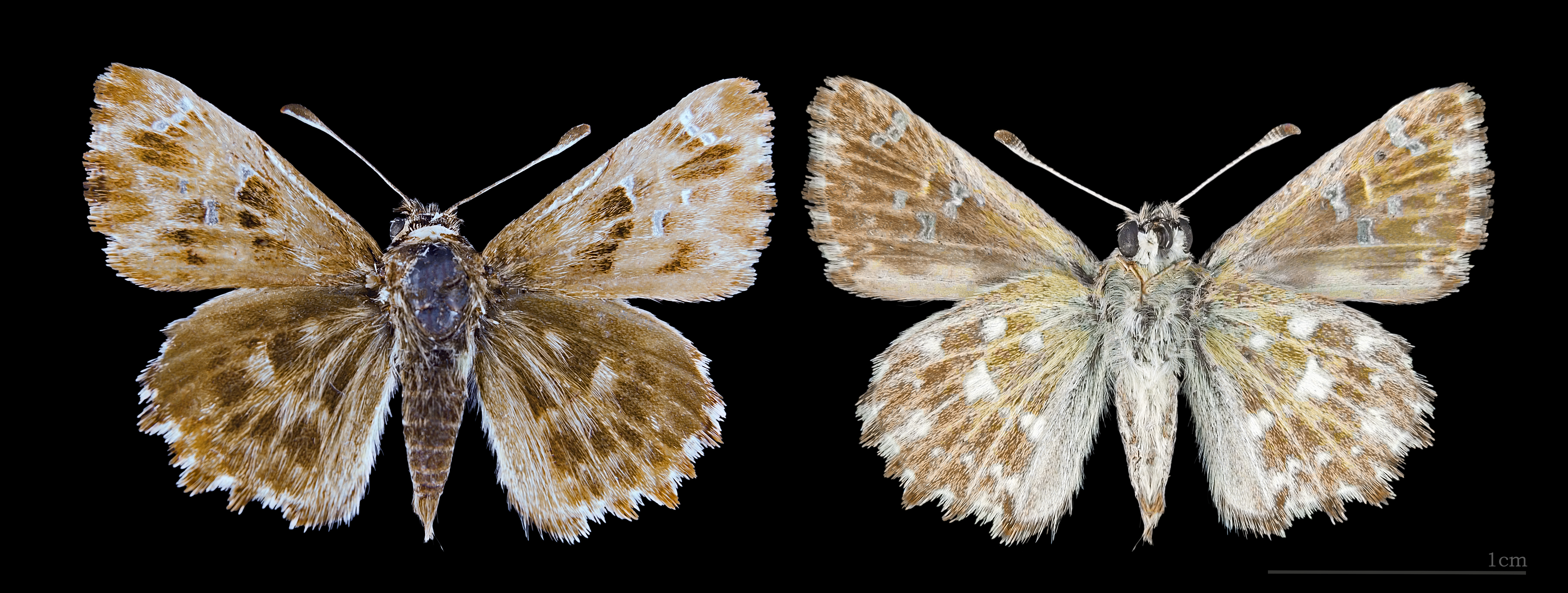
Two views of same mounted specimen

This species is very similar to the Marbled skipper (Carcharodus lavatherae) and almost indistinguishable from the False mallow skipper (Carcharodus tripolinus). Distinguishing features of Carcharodus alceae are the toothed hind wing edge and the small "glass spots" (unscaled areas) on the forewings with a black-brown basic color. The male of Carcharodus alceae has no tufts of hair on the underside of the forewings and can therefore be safely distinguished from Carcharodus flocciferus.

== Distribution and habitat ==
This widespread and common species can be found from Western Europe to Central Asia e.g. in most of southern and central Europe, in northern Africa (Morocco east to Tunisia and Libya), in the Middle East, in Asia Minor, the Caucasus, in northern India, in the Middle and Central Asia, in the western Himalayas and in the south of Western Siberia. In Europe, the species occurs mainly in the Mediterranean area. In Germany, the regular distribution extends to Central Germany (north to the Kyffhäuser Mountains). Evidence in previously unpopulated areas of Central Europe clearly indicates that C. alceae is currently in a phase of spreading.

These butterflies prefer dry warm and stony areas, wasteland, warm ruderals and gardens at an elevation up to 1,100 metres (3,600 ft) above sea level. The altitudinal distribution of Carcharodus alceae in Bavaria extends from about 100 m to 600 m, the focus is in the Colline zone with an altitude distribution between 200 m and 500 m.

A wide range of grassland habitats and ruderal meadows with occurrences of mallow species serve as habitat for Carcharodus alceae. In Middle and Southern Franconian Jura, these are imperfections in limestone and sandy grasslands or ruderal embankments as well as other thermophilic ruderal meadows. Other habitats include fallow land, especially industrial wasteland, roadsides and arable fields that have been sown with seed mixtures, and oviposition also take place regularly in gardens and on the edge of vineyards. In limestone grasslands, especially locations with patchy and disturbed vegetation, such as limestone rubble areas, seams or marginal transition structures to fields are used. Numerous observations have been made in the last few years in freshly cleared limestone grasslands over open bare ground. At the latter there is temporarily an increased settlement of mallow species.

The powerfully flying imagos can evidently colonize newly created habitats very quickly. Often a single mallow plant is enough. In the Neumarkt / Oberpfalz district in Germany, for example, it has been possible to detect the species both as a butterfly and as a caterpillar in almost all of the larger grassland areas over the past ten years, albeit mostly only in low density. Although the imagos are very capable of flying and thus spreading rapidly, they are mostly observed in the vicinity of their larval habitats.

== Ecology ==
The easily recognizable, folded and spun leaves (leaf bags) are an unmistakable indication of caterpillars of the species. In addition to their appearance in gardens, they have led to the fact that the way of life of the larva of C. alceae was already known to Maria Sibylla Merian in the 17th century. Often several caterpillars can be found on one plant at the same time. Mallow skippers lay their eggs on top of the leaves of different species of mallow (hence the common name of the species). The larvae mainly feed on Malva alcea, Malva sylvestris, Malva moschata, Althaea officinalis, Lavatera thuringiaca and Hibiscus species. The preferred regional use of these species mostly depends on their distribution and frequency. At arid locations in the Middle Jura as well as on the edges of vineyards in the Steigerwald, oviposition on Malva neglecta has been demonstrated. On the embankments of the Rhine-Main-Danube Canal, Lavatera thuringiaca, which is spread here in large numbers, is accepted as a food plant. Further observations have been made on Althaea officinalis and Alcea rosea.

Caterpillars are found in Bavaria from May 12th until September 23rd. They reach their peak occurrence in the second half of August and, with the exception of the last decade of June and the first and last decade of July, are almost continuously documented. The fully grown caterpillar overwinters and pupates in spring without any further food intake. Wintering does not take place on the food plants, but it is apparently still unknown where exactly the caterpillars spend the cold season (presumably in the litter).

The imagos get nectar from various herbaceous plants. Various tall herbs serve as nectar plants, especially the mallow species themselves. The moths often suckle in damp places on unpaved roads.

The butterfly flies from April to October depending on the location. In Central Europe usually, this species has two generations (April–May and July), while in southern areas three or more generations are present. Their flight time is heavily dependent on the annual weather conditions and ranges from mid-April to early September. First generation individuals are mainly observed in May. The transition from the first to the second generation is fluid in the overall view of all years, with the number of butterfly finds declining significantly in early / mid-June. From the beginning / middle of July, more individuals of the second generation appear, which are usually much more numerous. From the middle of August, the finds of butterflies will decrease.

== Conservation ==
The larger grazed limestone grass complexes with regular dynamic processes play a key role in the protection of this species. Mowing areas or meadows, on the other hand, are hardly colonizable for the species. In an increasing number of areas, cultivated mallows and hollyhocks are offering a new habitat in gardens. The increasing withdrawal of set-aside land could lead to regional declines of this species again in the medium term, despite increasing heat sums. An increased creation of field margins or diverse fallow areas, on the other hand, could have a positive effect on the population. Carcharodus alceae can be promoted comparatively easily by planting full sun hollyhocks and mallows in private gardens, especially since these host plants already have a long tradition as garden plants.

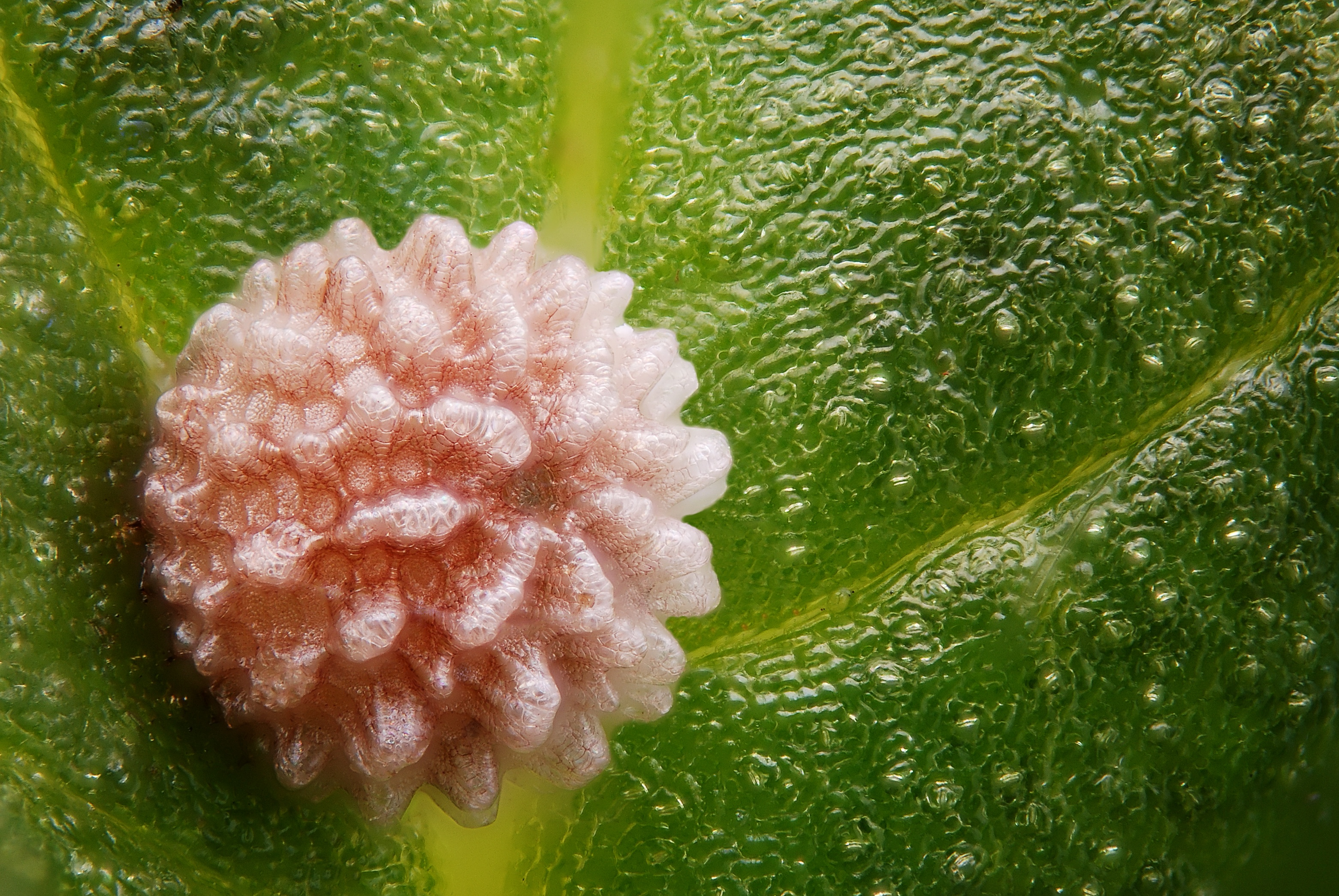
Egg

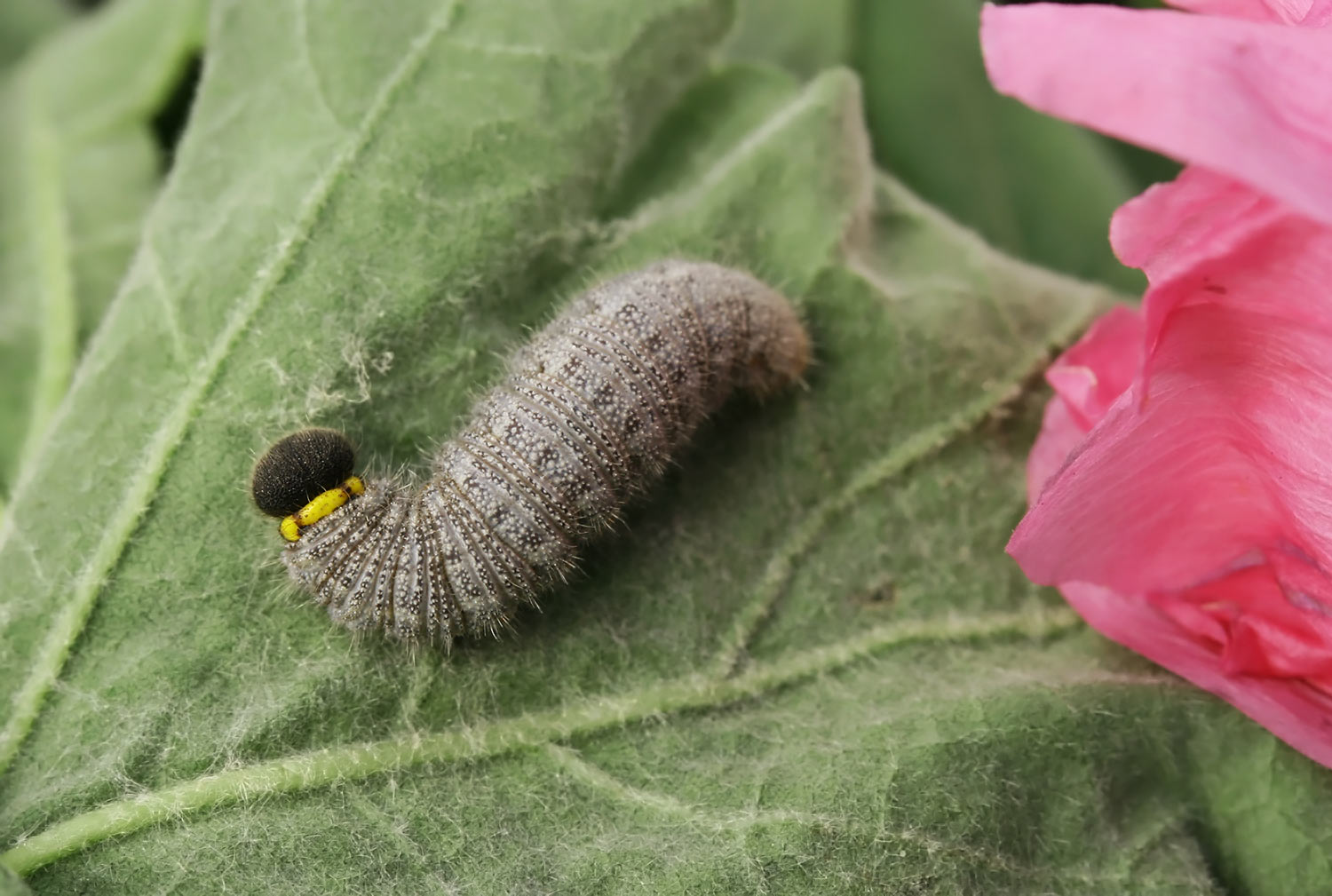
Larva

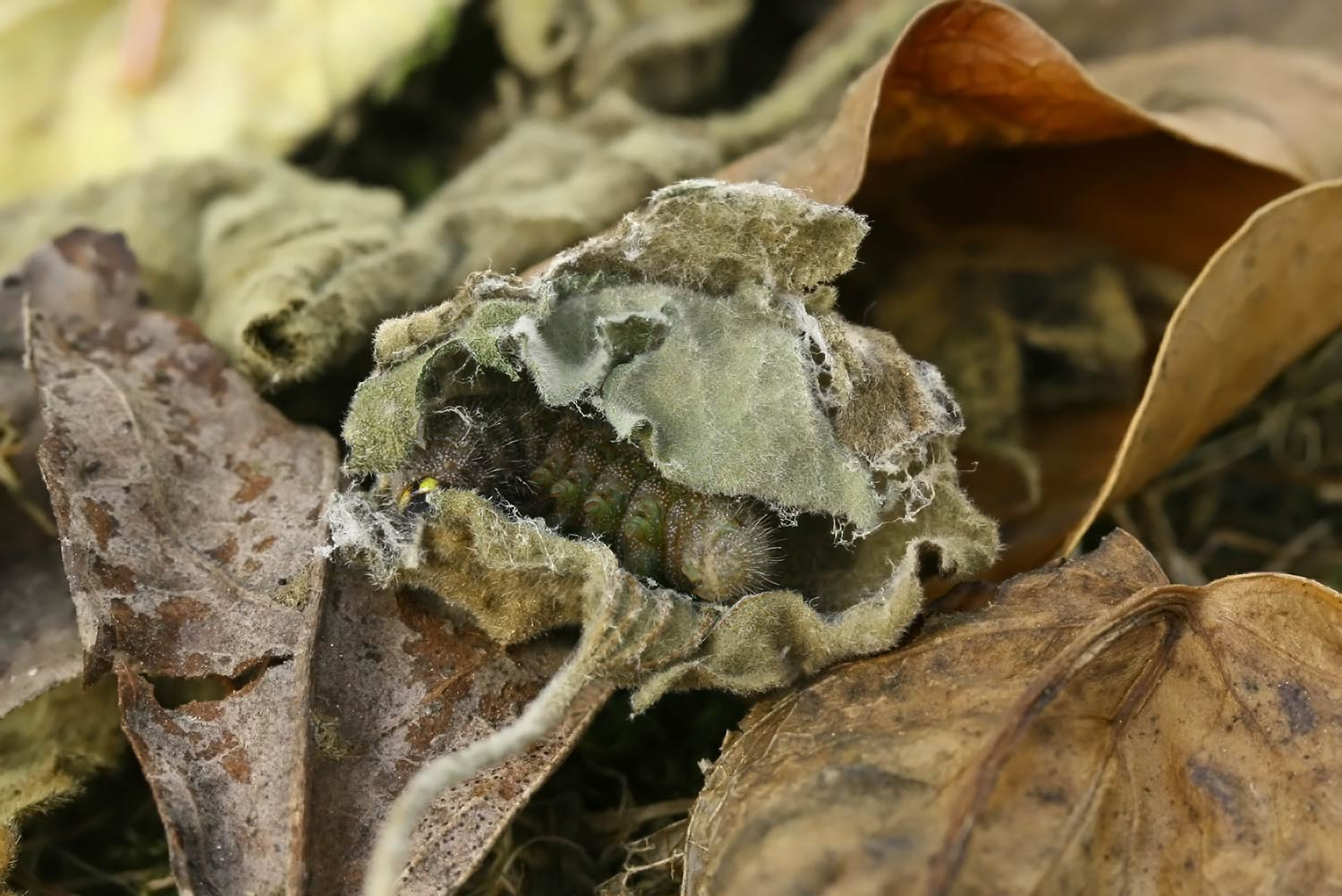
Cocoon

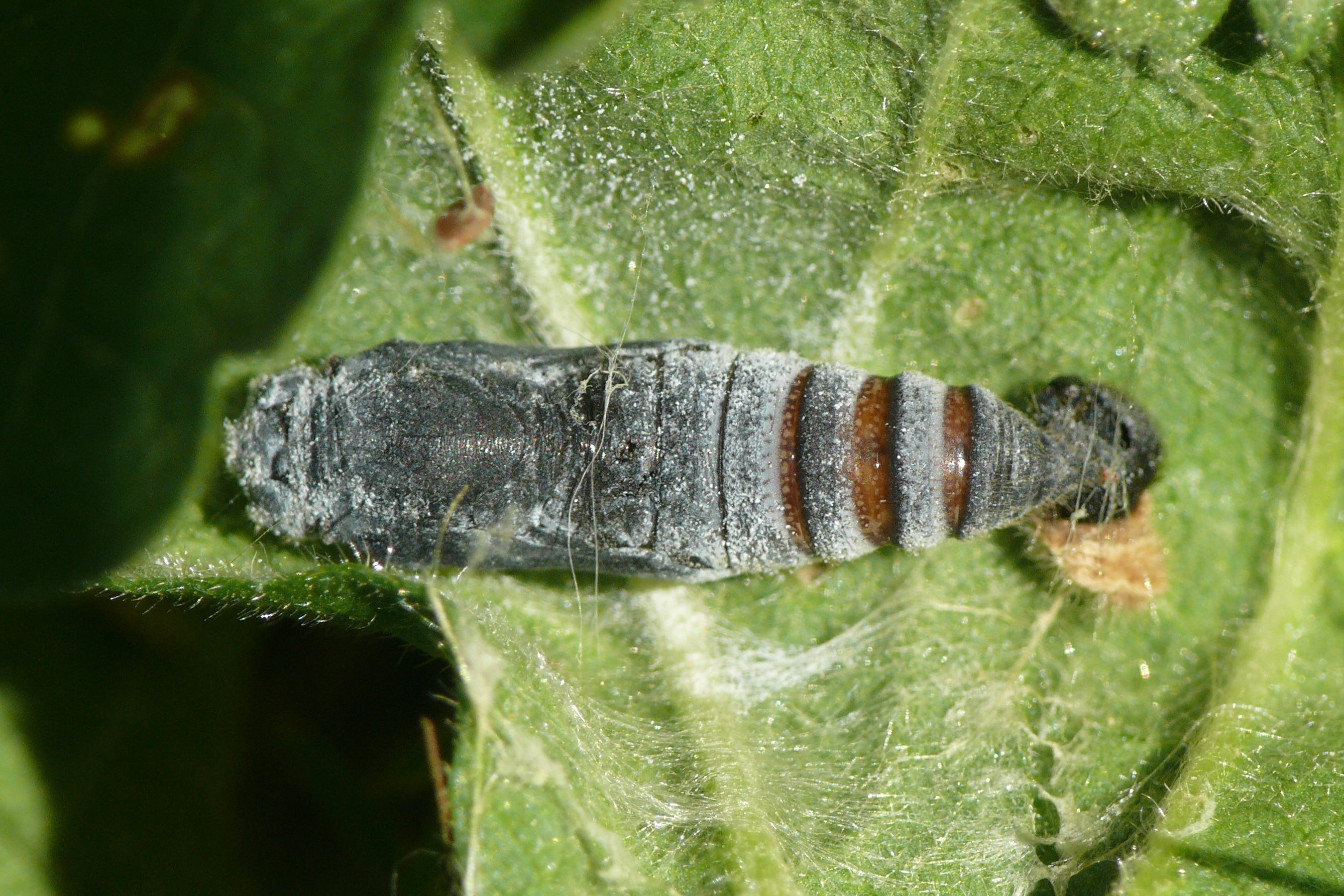
Pupa

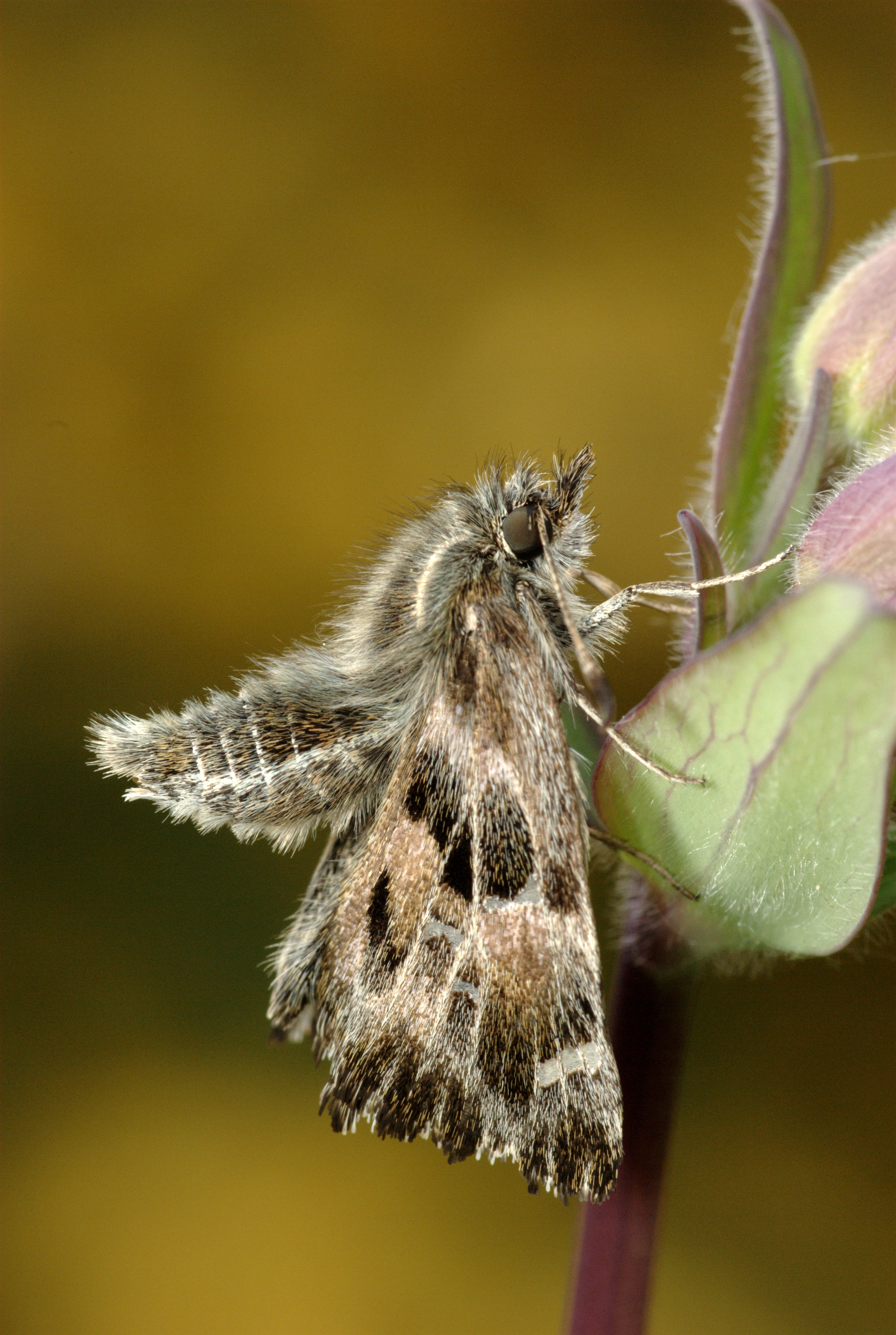
Imago

== Bibliography ==
- Dubi Benyamini Euphorbiaceae – A new host-plant family for Carcharodus alceae Esper, 1780 (Lepidoptera: Hesperiidae) and a discussion on the use of Euphorbiaceae by butterfly larvae (Papilionoidea, Hesperioidea) in the world // Nota lepid.. – Israel, 2005. – Vol. 28, n. 2.- pp. 75–92. - ISSN 0342-7536.
- Martin Konvicka & Tomas Kadlec How to increase the value of urban areas for butterfly conservation? A lesson from Prague nature reserves and parks - Vol. 108. . pp. 219–229. – ISSN 1210-5759.
