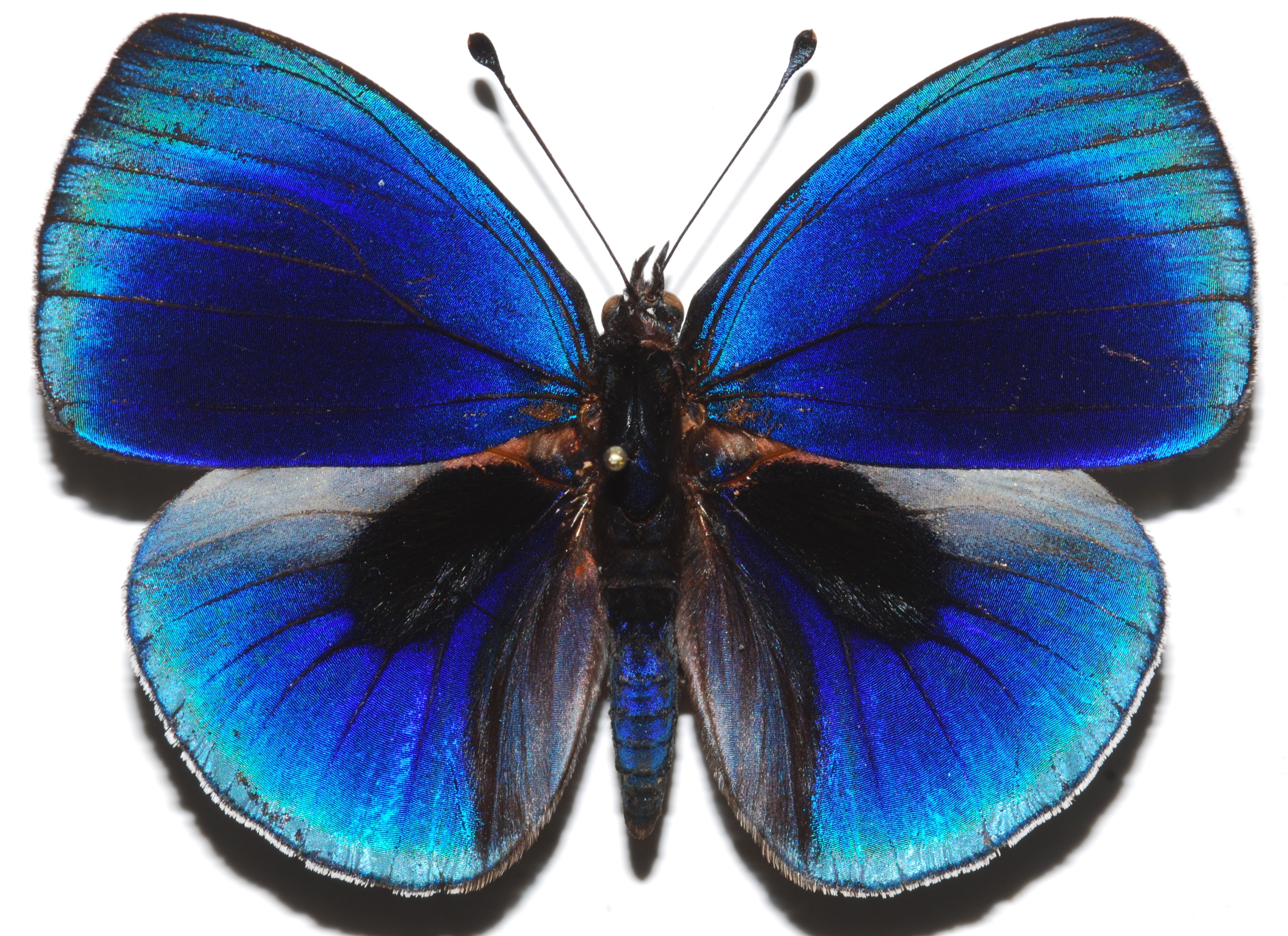
- Asterope leprieuri. Dorsal view

Scientific classification
- Kingdom: Animalia
- Phylum: Arthropoda
- Clade: Pancrustacea
- Class: Insecta
- Order: Lepidoptera
- Family: Nymphalidae
- Genus: Asterope
- Species: A. leprieuri

Binomial name
- Asterope leprieuri (Feisthamel, 1835)

Synonyms
- Callithea leprieuri Feisthamel, 1835; Callithea optima f. eminens Röber, 1915; Callithea depuiseti f. eudia Röber, 1915; Callithea fassli Röber, 1915; Callithea freyja Röber, 1915

= Asterope leprieuri =

Leprieur's glory

Species of butterfly

Asterope leprieuri, the Leprieur's glory, is a species of butterfly of the family Nymphalidae. It is found from Colombia to Brazil and Bolivia.

The wingspan is 50–60 mm.

== Subspecies ==
- Asterope leprieuri leprieuri (Brazil (Pará))
- Asterope leprieuri depuiseti (C. & R. Felder, 1861) (Peru, Bolivia)
- Asterope leprieuri optima (Butler, 1869) (Peru, Colombia, Ecuador)
- Asterope leprieuri philotima (Rebel, 1912) (Peru)

== Etymology ==
The name honours François Mathias René Leprieur.
