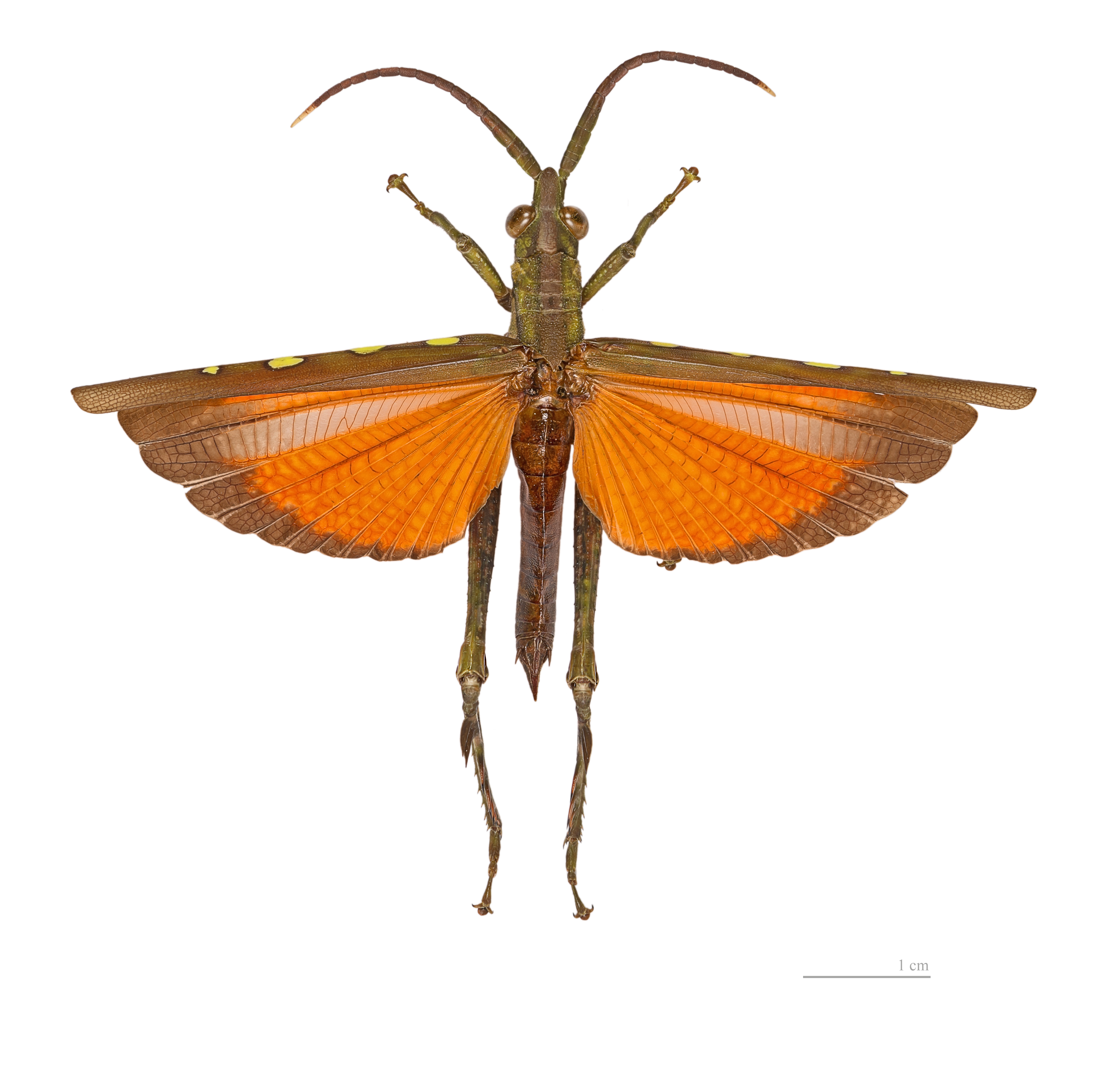

Scientific classification
- Kingdom: Animalia
- Phylum: Arthropoda
- Clade: Pancrustacea
- Class: Insecta
- Order: Orthoptera
- Suborder: Caelifera
- Family: Romaleidae
- Genus: Aeolacris
- Species: A. caternaultii

Binomial name
- Aeolacris caternaultii (Feisthamel, 1837)

Synonyms
- Aeloacris caternaultii (Feisthamel, 1837); Xiphicera caternaultii Feisthamel, 1837

= Aeolacris caternaultii =

Species of grasshopper

Aeolacris caternaultii is a species of grasshopper in the family Romaleidae, first described by Joachim Francois Philiberto de Feisthamel in 1837. The species was placed in Xiphicera by Joachim Francois Philiberto de Feisthamel, but moved to Aeolacris by Samuel Hubbard Scudder.

It belongs to the genus Aeolacris.

== Range ==
The locality of the neotype is Cayenne, French Guiana but is also known from Manaus, Brazil. Another specimen was also found at French Guiana, but is at Tumuc-Humac, Mitaraka, towards Sommet en Cloche.
