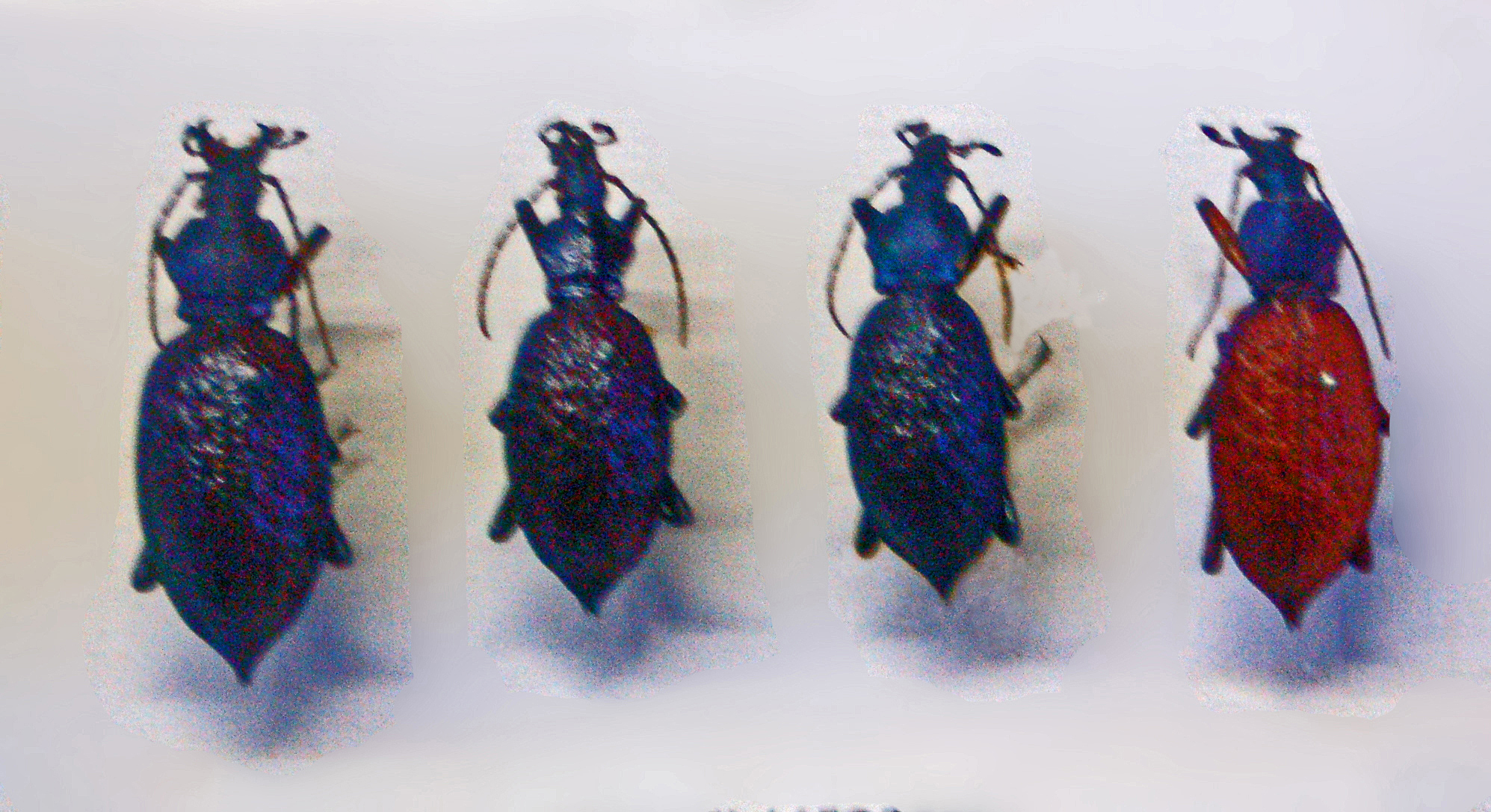
- Carabus lafossei, at National Museum (Prague)

Scientific classification
- Kingdom: Animalia
- Phylum: Arthropoda
- Class: Insecta
- Order: Coleoptera
- Suborder: Adephaga
- Family: Carabidae
- Genus: Carabus
- Species: C. lafossei

Binomial name
- Carabus lafossei Feisthamel, 1845

Synonyms
- Coptolabrus lafossei

= Carabus lafossei =

Species of beetle

Carabus lafossei is a species of beetles of the family Carabidae.

== Description ==
Carabus lafossei can reach a length of about 34–39 millimetres (1.3–1.5 in). The colours are quite variable, depending on the subspecies. Head and pronotum may be red or bluish, while the elytra may be red, bluish or green, with a strong metallic luster. The surface of elytra has numerous small tubercles. These beautiful ground beetle are active only at night. They primarily feed on slugs, snails and earthworms.

== Distribution ==
This species is native to the southern provinces of China.

== Subspecies ==
- Carabus lafossei buchi Hauser, 1913
- Carabus lafossei coelestis Stewart, 1845
- Carabus lafossei lafossei Feisthamel, 1845
- Carabus lafossei montigradus Hauser, 1920
- Carabus lafossei pseudocoelestis Kleinfeld, 1999
- Carabus lafossei saturatus Hauser, 1913
- Carabus lafossei tiantai Kleinfeld, 1997
- Carabus lafossei tungchengensis Li, 1993
