= Dialectica malvacea =

Scientific classification
- Kingdom: Animalia
- Phylum: Arthropoda
- Clade: Pancrustacea
- Class: Insecta
- Order: Lepidoptera
- Family: Gracillariidae
- Subfamily: Acrocercopinae
- Genus: Dialectica
- Species: D. malvacea

Binomial name
- Dialectica malvacea (Walsingham, 1907)

Synonyms
- Acrocercops malvacea Walsingham, 1907; Acrocercops malveus Caradja, 1920

Species of moth

Dialectica malvacea is a moth of the family Gracillariidae, known from Morocco. It was described by Walsingham, Lord Thomas de Grey, in 1907 as Acrocercops malvacea. The host plants are for this species of moth are Lavatera olbia and Malva species.
