= Dichomeris concinnalis =

Scientific classification
- Domain: Eukaryota
- Kingdom: Animalia
- Phylum: Arthropoda
- Class: Insecta
- Order: Lepidoptera
- Family: Gelechiidae
- Genus: Dichomeris
- Species: D. concinnalis

Binomial name
- Dichomeris concinnalis (Feisthamel, 1839)

Synonyms
- Atasthalistis concinnalis Feisthamel, 1839

Species of moth

Dichomeris concinnalis is a moth in the family Gelechiidae. It was described by Joachim François Philibert Feisthamel in 1839. It is found on the Moluccas.
