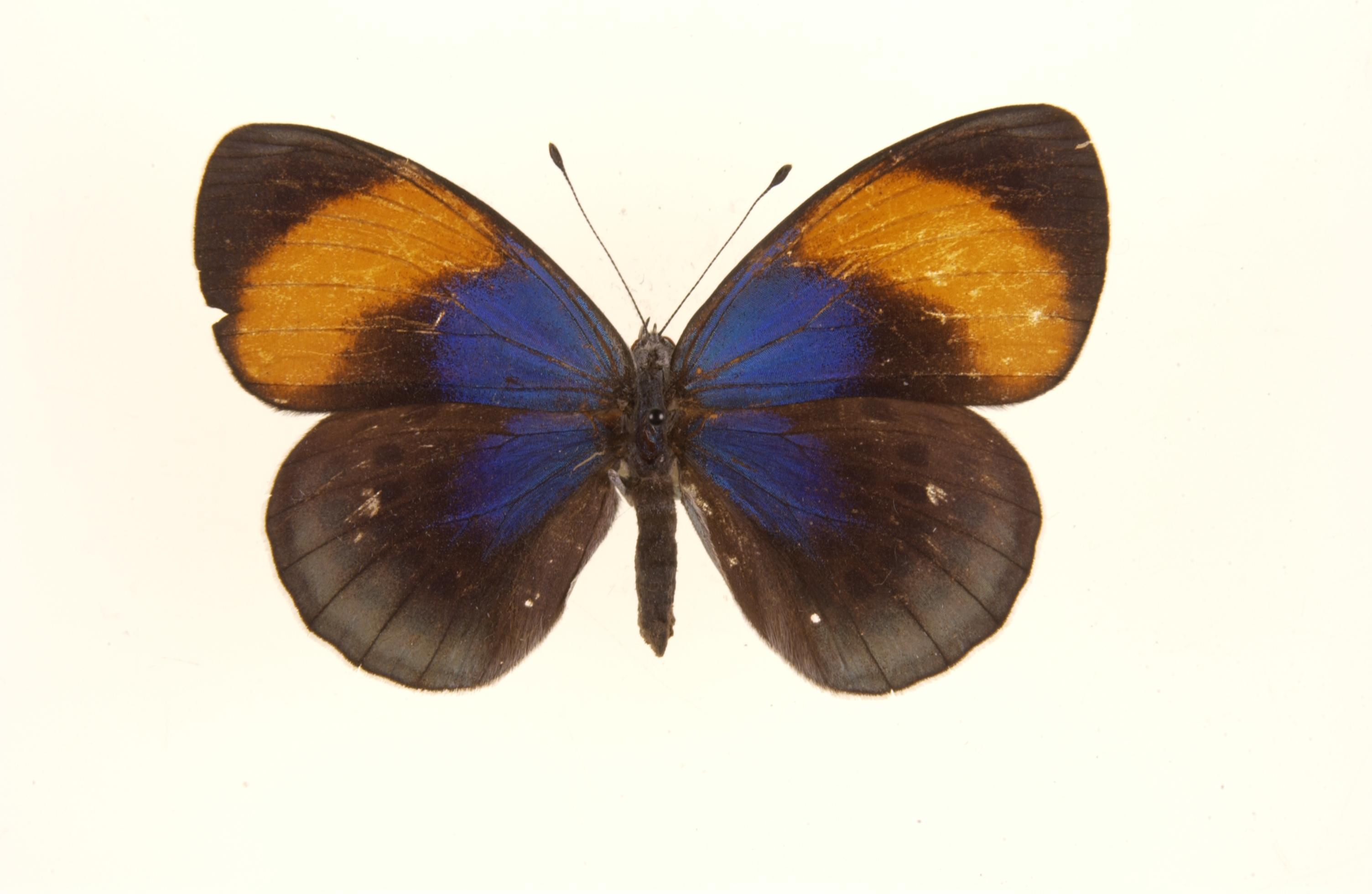
- Asterope batesii specimen

Scientific classification
- Kingdom: Animalia
- Phylum: Arthropoda
- Clade: Pancrustacea
- Class: Insecta
- Order: Lepidoptera
- Family: Nymphalidae
- Tribe: Ageroniini
- Genus: Asterope; Hübner, 1819

Type species
- Oreas sapphira Hübner, [1819]

Diversity
- Seven species

Synonyms
- Callithea Feisthamel, 1835; Callithea Boisduval, 1836 (non Feisthamel, 1835: preoccupied); Cyane Felder, 1861

= Asterope (butterfly) =

Genus of brush-footed butterflies

Asterope is a genus of brush-footed butterflies found in the Neotropical realm (South America).

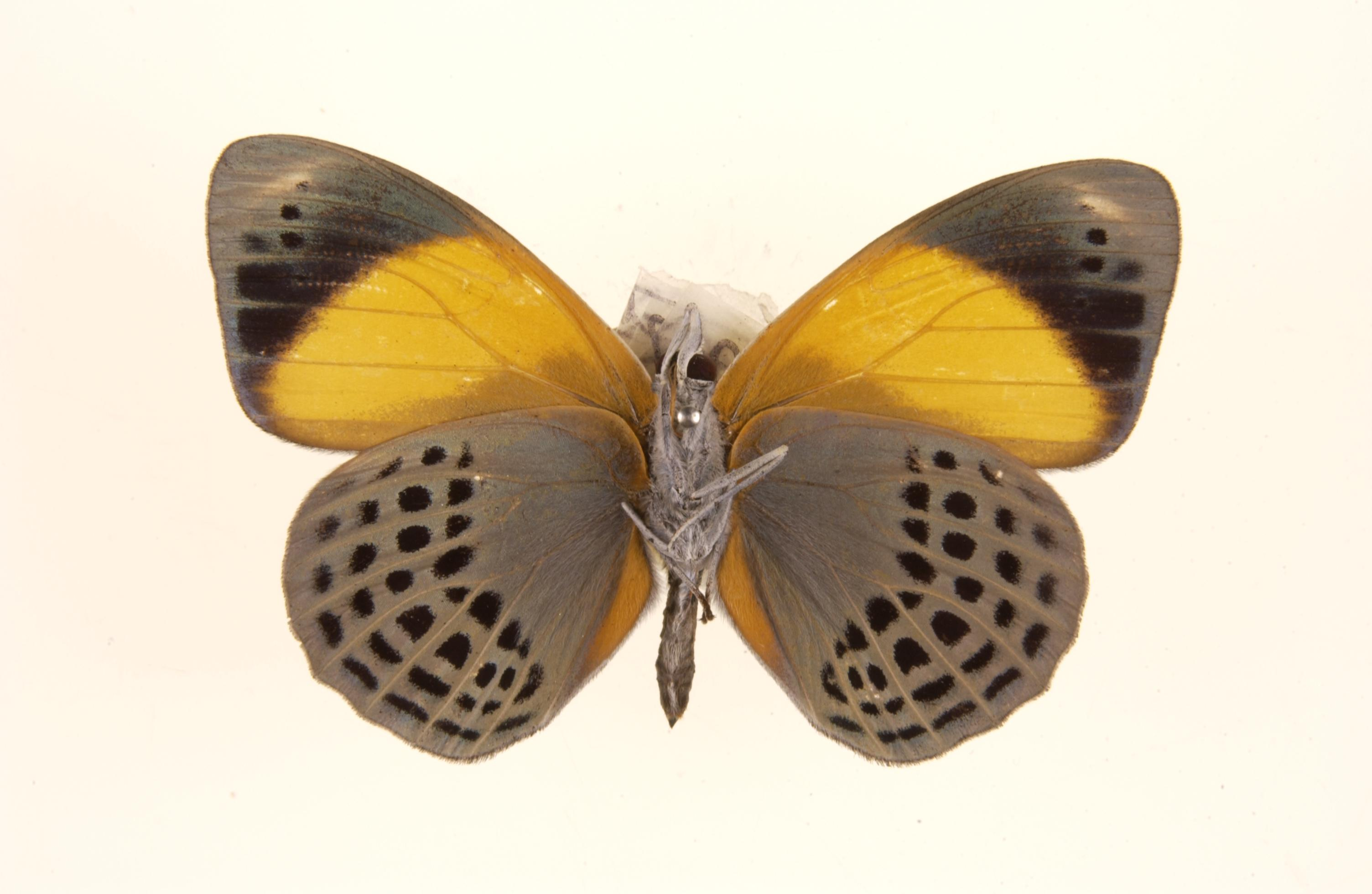
Asterope marki davisii, underside

== Species ==
Listed alphabetically:

- Asterope adamsi Lathy
- Asterope batesii (Hewitson, 1850) – Bates' asterope
- Asterope buckleyi (Hewitson, 1869)
- Asterope degandii Hewitson, 1858) – Hewitson's glory
- Asterope fassli Röber
- Asterope freyja Röber
- Asterope leprieuri (Feisthamel, 1835) – Leprieur's glory
- Asterope lugens Druce
- Asterope markii (Hewitson, 1857) – dotted glory
- Asterope optima (Butler, 1869)
- Asterope salvini Staudinger
- Asterope sapphira (Hübner, [1816])
- Asterope whitelyi Salvin, 1869
