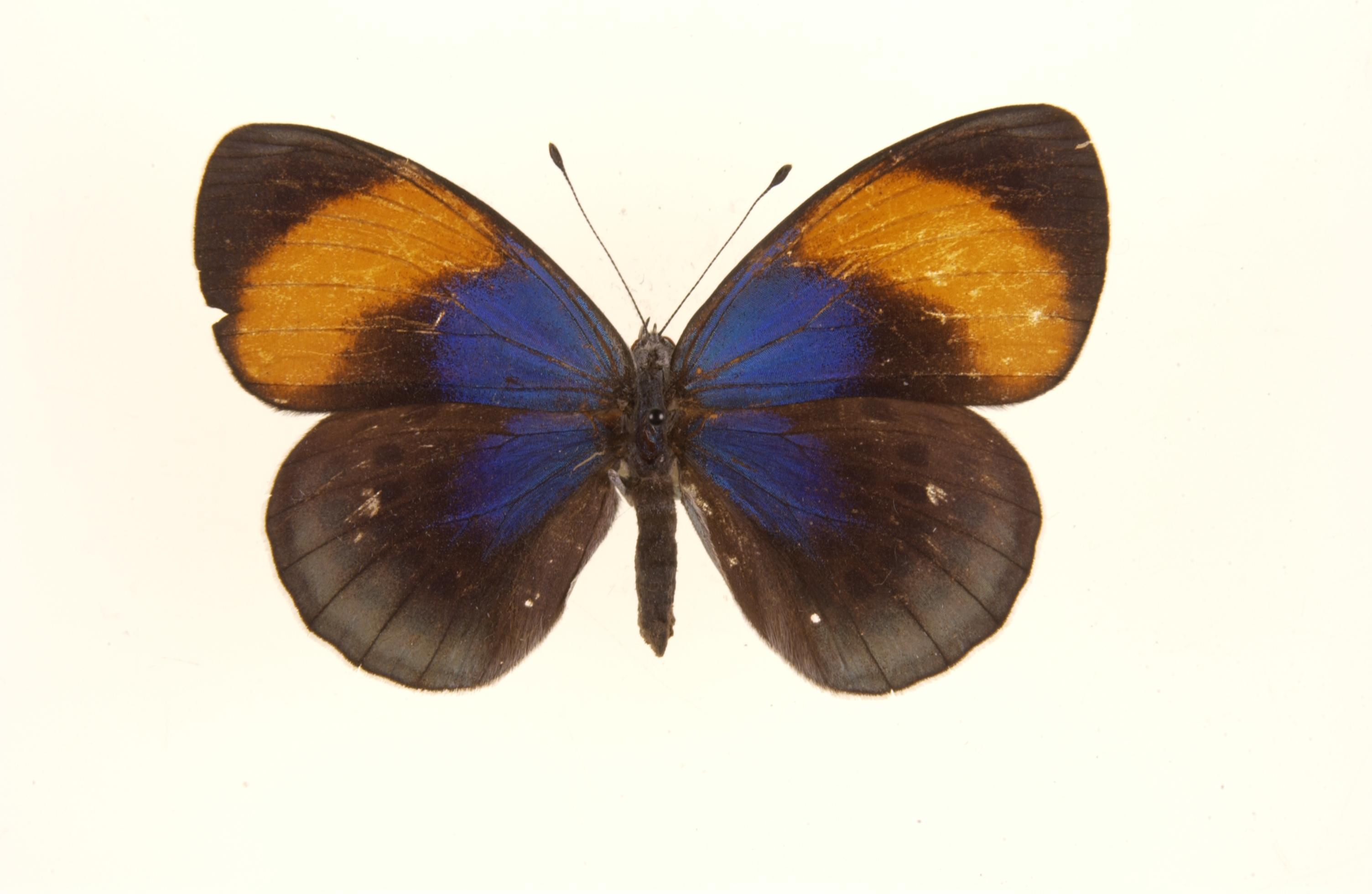

Scientific classification
- Kingdom: Animalia
- Phylum: Arthropoda
- Clade: Pancrustacea
- Class: Insecta
- Order: Lepidoptera
- Family: Nymphalidae
- Genus: Asterope
- Species: A. batesii

Binomial name
- Asterope batesii (Hewitson, 1850)

Synonyms
- Callithea batesii Hewitson, 1850; Callithea batesii munduruca Fassl, 1922; Callithea batesii aimeeana Fassl, 1922

= Asterope batesii =

Bates' asterope

Species of butterfly

Asterope batesii, the Bates' asterope, is a species of butterfly of the family Nymphalidae. It is found in inland Brazil, including Ayeyros, along the Tapajós and in Tefé on the Upper Amazon.

The larvae feed on Paullinia species.
