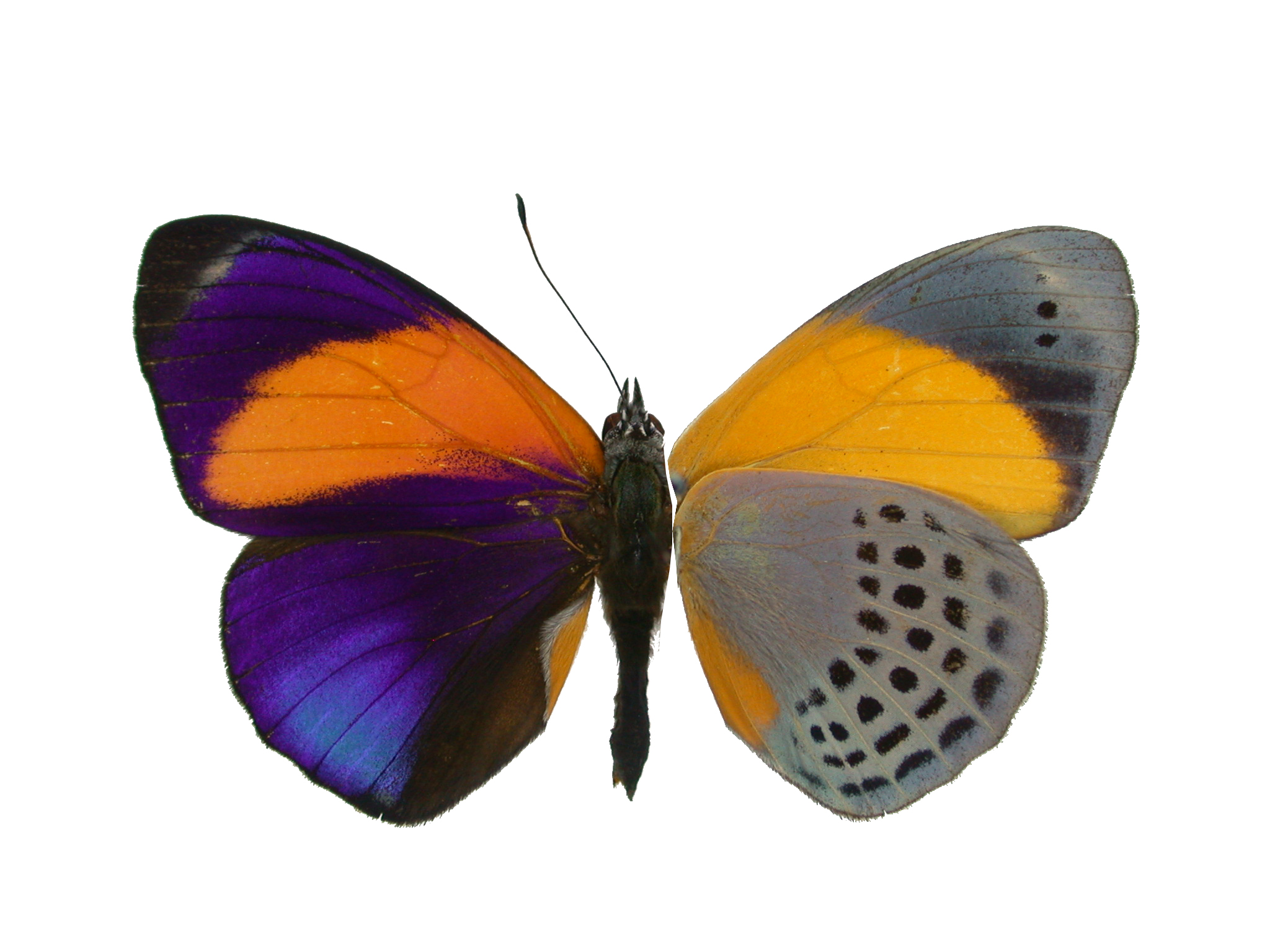

Scientific classification
- Kingdom: Animalia
- Phylum: Arthropoda
- Clade: Pancrustacea
- Class: Insecta
- Order: Lepidoptera
- Family: Nymphalidae
- Genus: Asterope
- Species: A. markii

Binomial name
- Asterope markii (Hewitson, 1857)

Synonyms
- Callithea markii Hewitson, 1857; Callithea wallacei Staudinger, 1886; Callithea refulgens Kaye, 1919; Callithea boyi Röber, 1924; Callithea hewitsoni Staudinger, 1886; Callithea davisii Butler, 1877

= Asterope markii =

Dotted glory

Species of butterfly

Asterope markii, the dotted glory, is a species of butterfly of the family Nymphalidae. It is found in Brazil, Ecuador, Colombia, Peru, Guyana, and Venezuela.

The larvae feed on Paullinia species.

== Subspecies ==
- Asterope markii markii (Hewitson, 1857) (Brazil (Amazonas))
- Asterope markii boyi (Röber, 1924) (Brazil (Pará))
- Asterope markii ackeryi Jenkins, 1987 (Brazil (Pará))
- Asterope markii hewitsoni (Staudinger, 1886) (Ecuador, Colombia)
- Asterope markii davisii (Butler, 1877) (Peru, Ecuador, Brazil (Acre))
- Asterope markii gallardi Neukirchen, 1996 (French Guiana)
- Asterope markii werneri Neukirchen, 1996 (Brazil (Amazonas))
