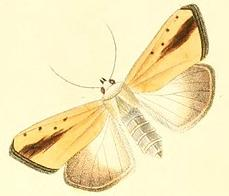
- Pardoxia graellsii

Scientific classification
- Domain: Eukaryota
- Kingdom: Animalia
- Phylum: Arthropoda
- Class: Insecta
- Order: Lepidoptera
- Superfamily: Noctuoidea
- Family: Nolidae
- Subfamily: Chloephorinae
- Genus: Pardoxia; Vives Moreno & González Prada, 1981

= Pardoxia =

Genus of moths

Pardoxia is a genus of moths in the family Nolidae. The genus was erected by Antonio Vives Moreno and R. González Prada.

== Species ==
- Pardoxia dinarodes (Hampson, 1912) Yemen, Ethiopia, Kenya, Tanzania, Zaire
- Pardoxia gephyrias (Meyrick, 1902) Aden, Somalia
- Pardoxia graellsii (Feisthamel, 1837) southwestern Europe, Mauritania, Burkina Faso, Sierra Leone, the Gambia, Ghana, Nigeria, Equatorial Guinea, Zaire, Uganda, Malawi, Iraq, Arabia, Ethiopia, Zambia, Zimbabwe, South Africa, Namibia, Cape, Verde, Reunion, Comoros, Mauritius, Madagascar, Punjab
