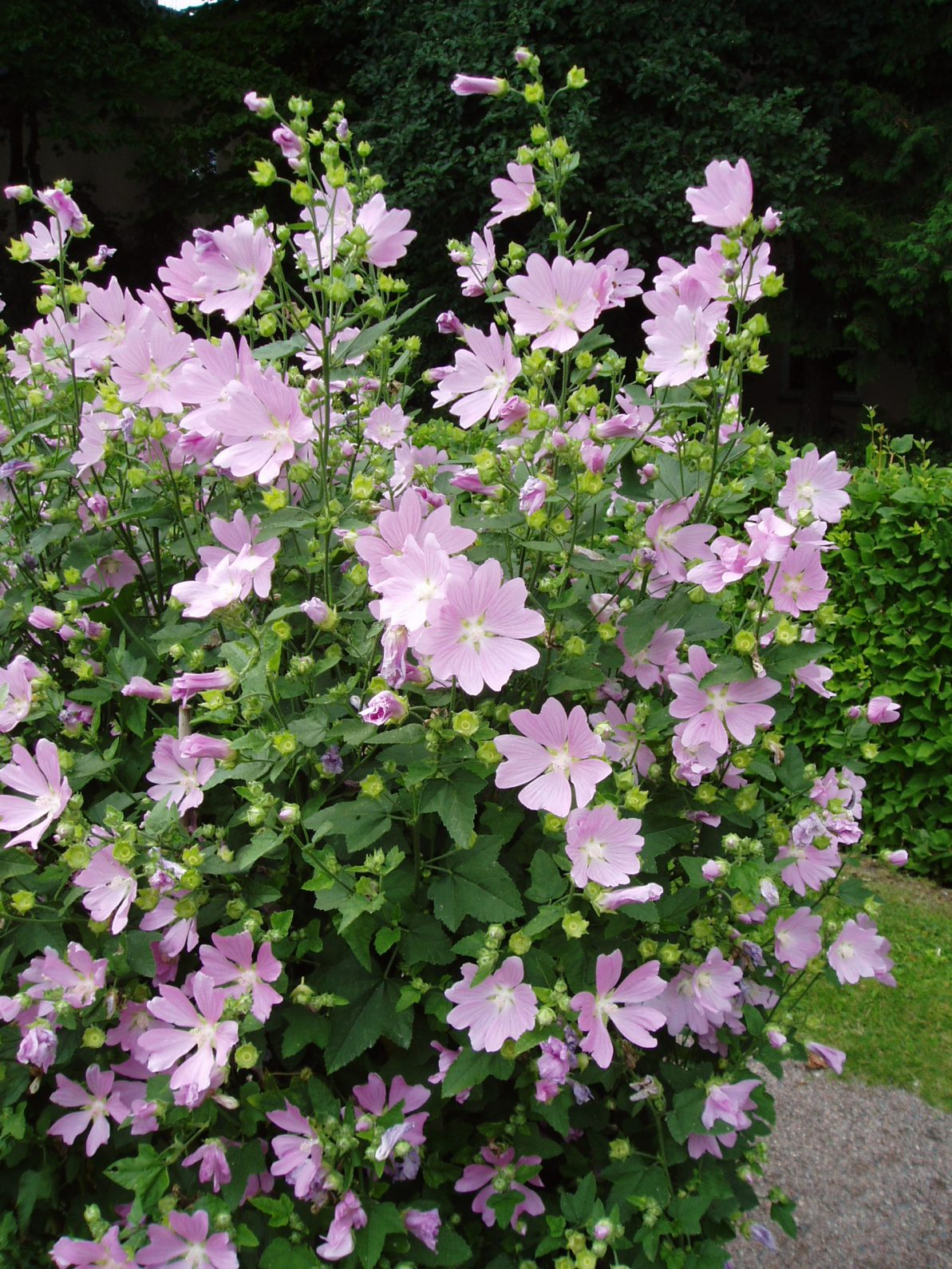

Scientific classification
- Kingdom: Plantae
- Clade: Tracheophytes
- Clade: Angiosperms
- Clade: Eudicots
- Clade: Rosids
- Order: Malvales
- Family: Malvaceae
- Genus: Malva
- Species: M. thuringiaca

Binomial name
- Malva thuringiaca (L.) Vis.

= Malva thuringiaca =

Species of flowering plant

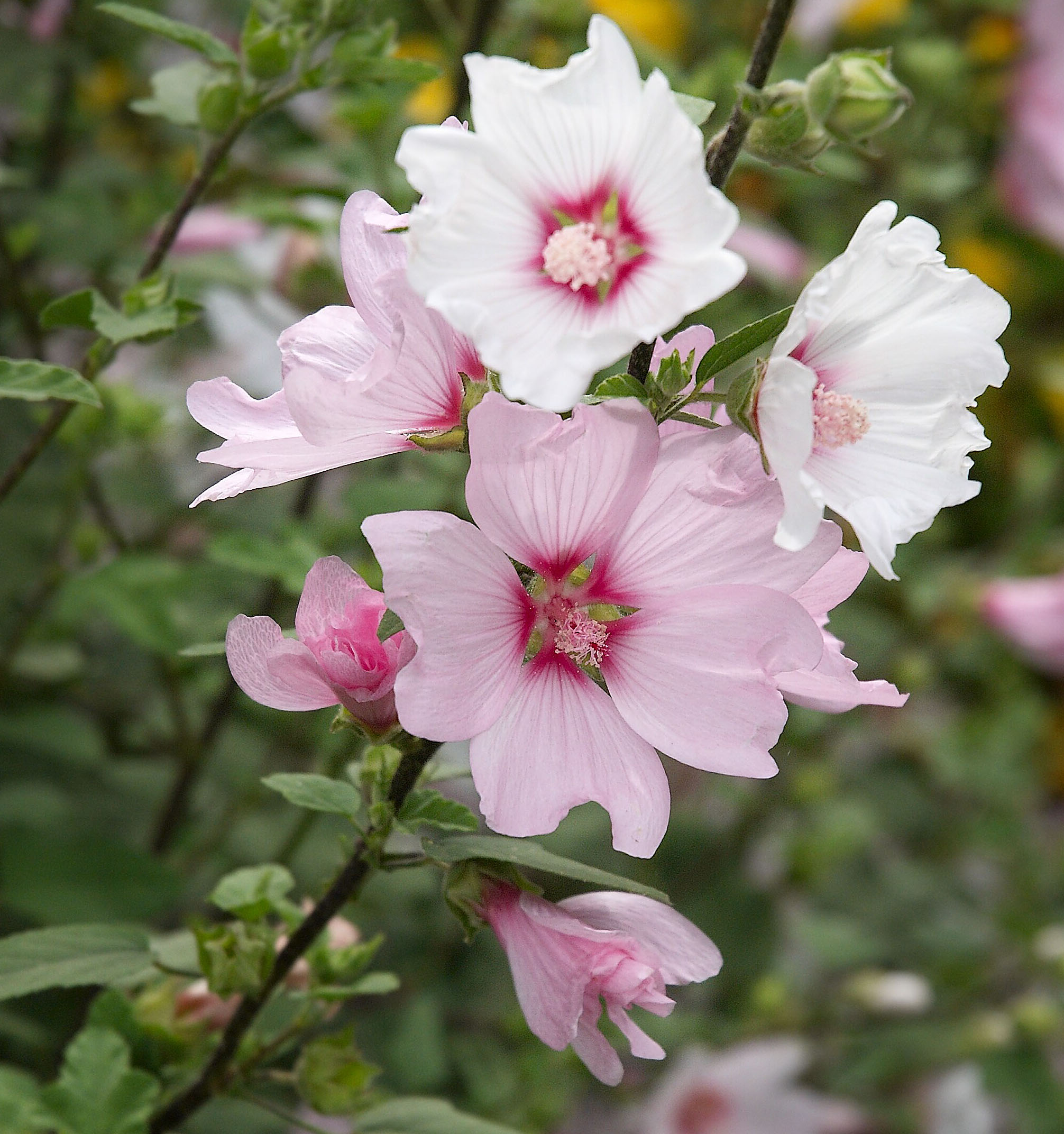
’Barnsley’, a cultivar of L. × clementii

Malva thuringiaca (previously known as Lavatera thuringiaca), the garden tree-mallow, is a species of flowering plant in the mallow family Malvaceae, native to eastern Europe and southwestern Asia, from southern Germany south to Italy, and east to southern Russia, Kazakhstan, and Turkey.

It is a herbaceous perennial plant growing to 1.8 m tall. The leaves are up to 9 cm long and broad, palmately lobed with three or five lobes, and downy with greyish hairs. The flowers are pink, 3–6 cm diameter, with five petals; they are produced throughout the summer.

There are two subspecies:

- Malva thuringiaca subsp. thuringiaca – Most of the species' range, except as below, Upper leaves bluntly lobed
- Malva thuringiaca subsp. ambigua (DC.) Valdés – southern France, Italy, western Balkans, Upper leaves acutely lobed

== Garden plants ==
Most of the popular shrubby garden cultivars traditionally listed under this species are actually hybrids between it and Malva olbia; these hybrids are now named Malva × clementii. The following cultivars have gained the Royal Horticultural Society's Award of Garden Merit:-

- 'Bredon Springs'
- 'Burgundy Wine'
- 'Candy Floss'
- 'Rosea'
