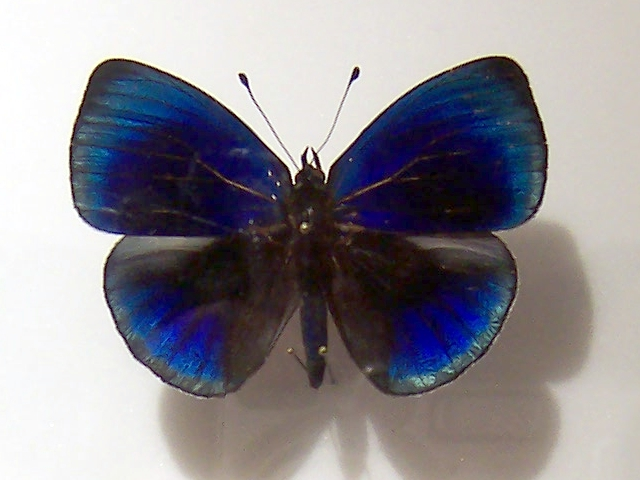
- Dorsal view
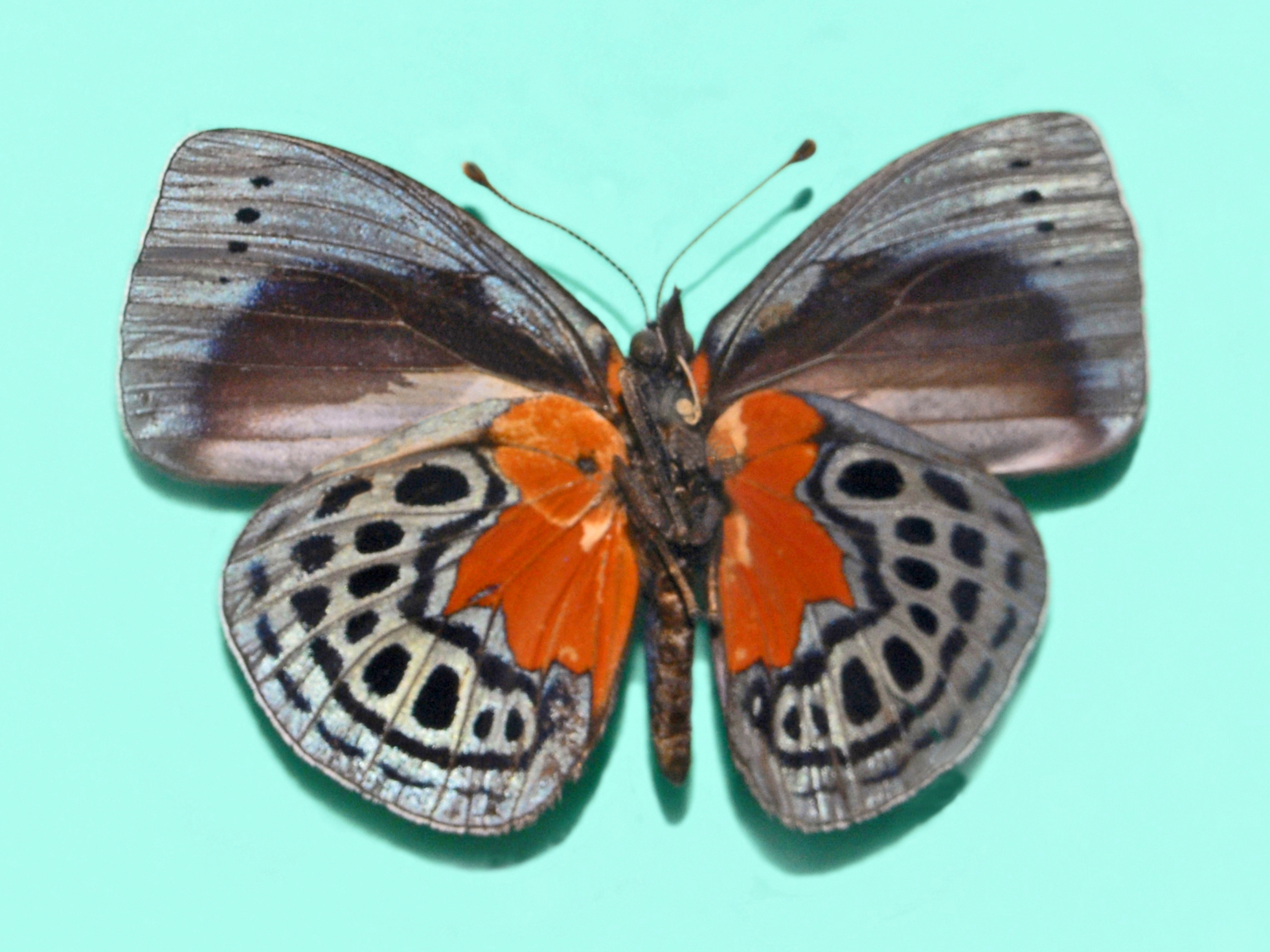
- Ventral view

Scientific classification
- Kingdom: Animalia
- Phylum: Arthropoda
- Clade: Pancrustacea
- Class: Insecta
- Order: Lepidoptera
- Family: Nymphalidae
- Genus: Asterope
- Species: A. optima

Binomial name
- Asterope optima (Butler, 1869)

Synonyms
- Callithea optima; Asterope optima optima (Butler, 1869); Asterope optima philotima (Rebel, 1912); Asterope leprieuri optima (Butler, 1869); Asterope leprieuri philotima (Rebel, 1912)

= Asterope optima =

Species of butterfly

Asterope optima is a species of butterfly of the family Nymphalidae.

== Description ==
The wingspan of Asterope optima can reach 57–68 millimetres (2.2–2.7 in). The coloration and patterns of this species are quite variable. Usually the dorsal sides of the wings are metallic bright blue with paler margins, while the under sides are basically grayish or pale blue with rows of small black spots and lines on the hindwings and a large reddish-orange patch on the basal half of the hindwings. The adults fly all year round but they are most common from September to November.

== Distribution and habitat ==
This species can be found from southern Colombia through Ecuador to northern Peru and western Brazil. It occurs in tropical evergreen and semi-deciduous forests, at an elevation of 100–2,400 metres (330–7,870 ft) above sea level.
