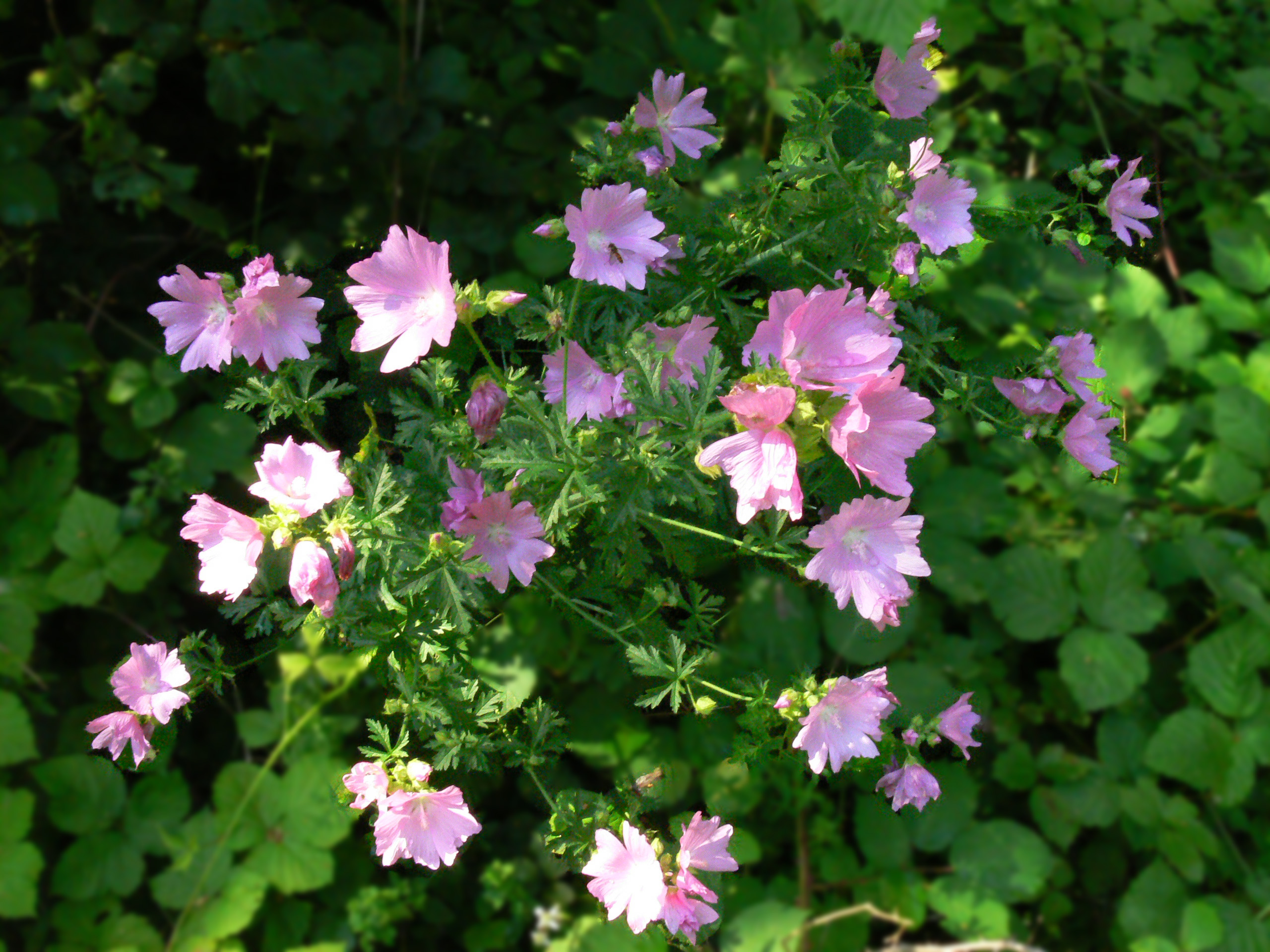

Scientific classification
- Kingdom: Plantae
- Clade: Tracheophytes
- Clade: Angiosperms
- Clade: Eudicots
- Clade: Rosids
- Order: Malvales
- Family: Malvaceae
- Genus: Malva
- Species: M. alcea

Binomial name
- Malva alcea L.

Synonyms
- Bismalva alcea (L.) Medik.

= Malva alcea =

Species of flowering plant

Malva alcea, commonly known as the greater musk-mallow, cut-leaved mallow, vervain mallow or hollyhock mallow, is a plant in the mallow family native to southwestern, central and eastern Europe and southwestern Asia, from Spain north to southern Sweden and east to Russia and Turkey.

== Description ==
It is a herbaceous perennial plant growing to 50–125 cm tall, with stems covered in stellate hairs, meaning they branch at the free end into several strands. The leaves are 2–8 cm long and 2–8 cm broad, palmately lobed with five to seven blunt lobes; basal leaves on the lower stem are very shallowly lobed, those higher on the stems are deeply divided, with digitate finger-like lobes. The flowers appear singly near the apex of corymbose racemes growing from the leaf axils in summer to early fall. They are 3.5–6 cm diameter, with five sepals and five bright pink petals, and have no scent. The bracteoles that make up the epicalyx are ovate and wide at the base where they are fused with the calyx. The fruit is a hairless disc-shaped schizocarp 4–8 mm diameter, containing several seeds, the seeds individually enclosed in a glabrous or hairy mericarp. It has a chromosome count of 2n=84.

== Subspecies ==
Two subspecies are accepted.

- Malva alcea subsp. alcea – southern Sweden to southern and eastern Europe and northern Turkey
- Malva alcea subsp. ribifolia (Viv.) Kerguélen (synonym Malva ribifolia Viv.) – Corsica

== Gallery ==
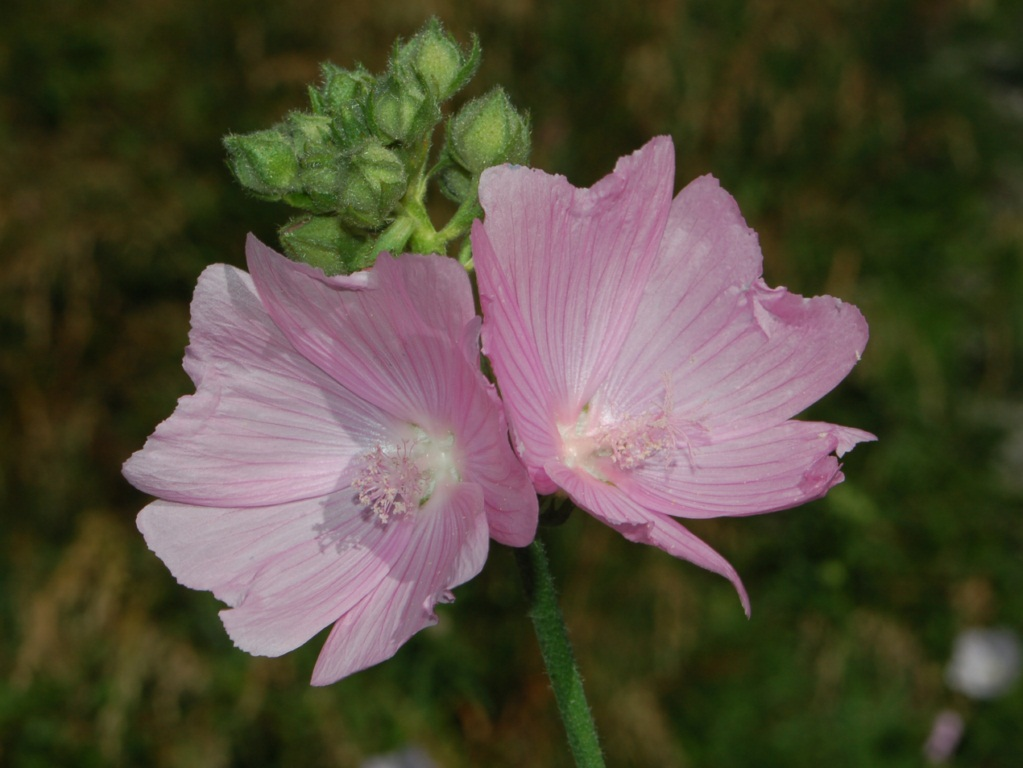
Flowers of Malva alcea

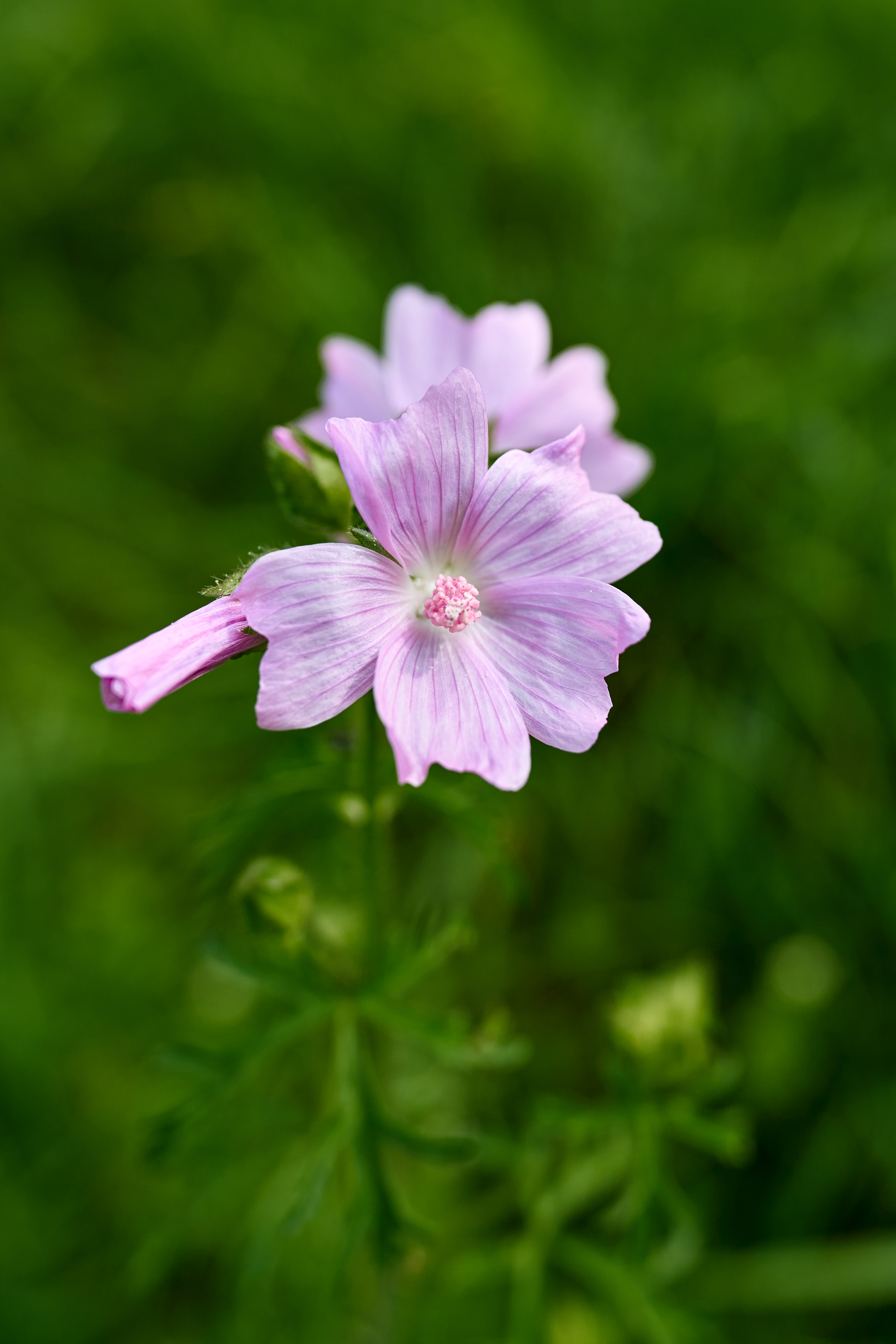
Close-up on flower of Malva alcea

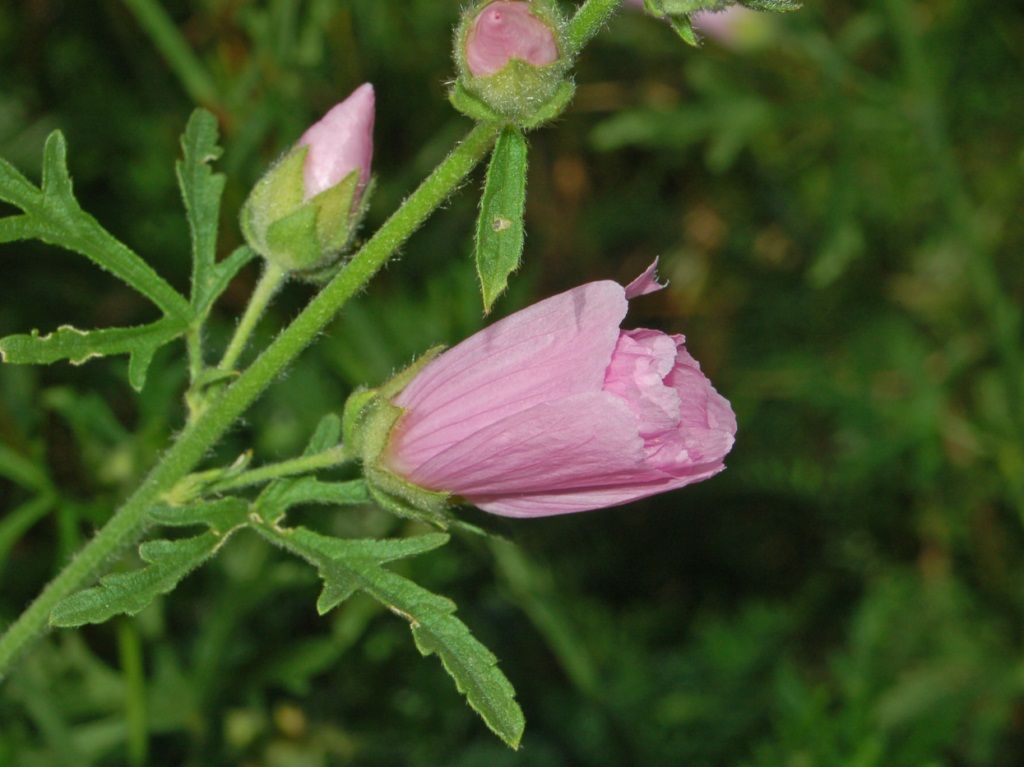
Flower of Malva alcea

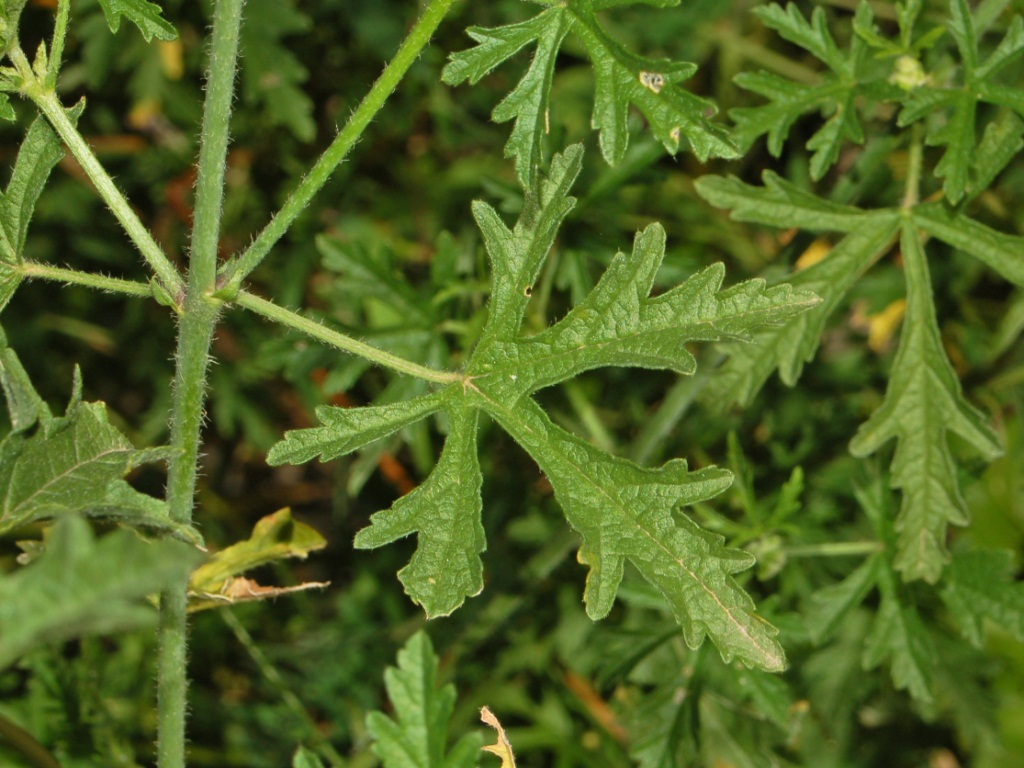
Leaf of Malva alcea

== Ecology ==
It is most common in drier soils in thickets, along paths and in waste places. Natural hybrids with the closely related Malva moschata are occasionally found. In central Europe it grows at altitudes of up to 2,000 m.

== Cultivation and uses ==
It has been widely grown outside of its native range as an ornamental plant. Several cultivars exist such as 'Fastigata', an upright form, and 'Alba', a white flowered form. In some areas, such as the northeastern United States, the plant has escaped from cultivation and become naturalised. It is very similar to, and often confused with Malva moschata.

== Synonyms of subsp. alcea ==
Some synonyms of subsp. alcea include:

- Malva abulensis Cav.
- Malva bismalva Bernh. ex Lej.
- Malva fastigiata Cav.
- Malva italica Pollini
- Malva lagascae Lázaro Ibiza & Andrés Tubilla
- Malva lobata Cav.
- Malva morenii Pollini
