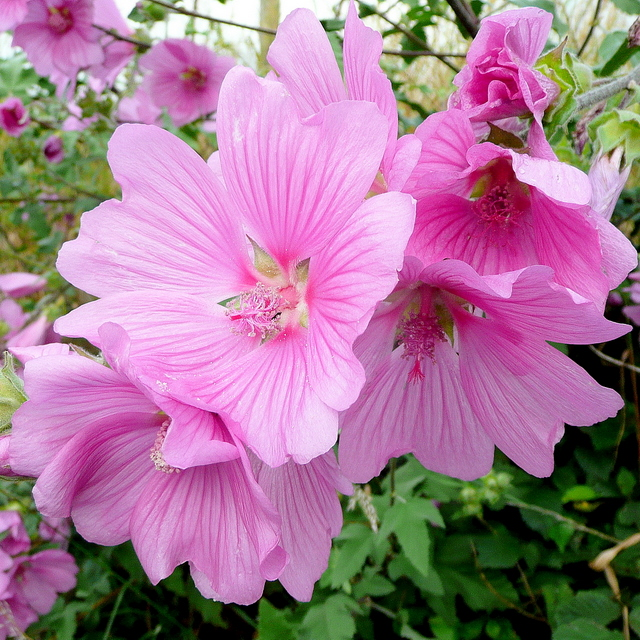
- Flowers of 'Rosea' cultivar
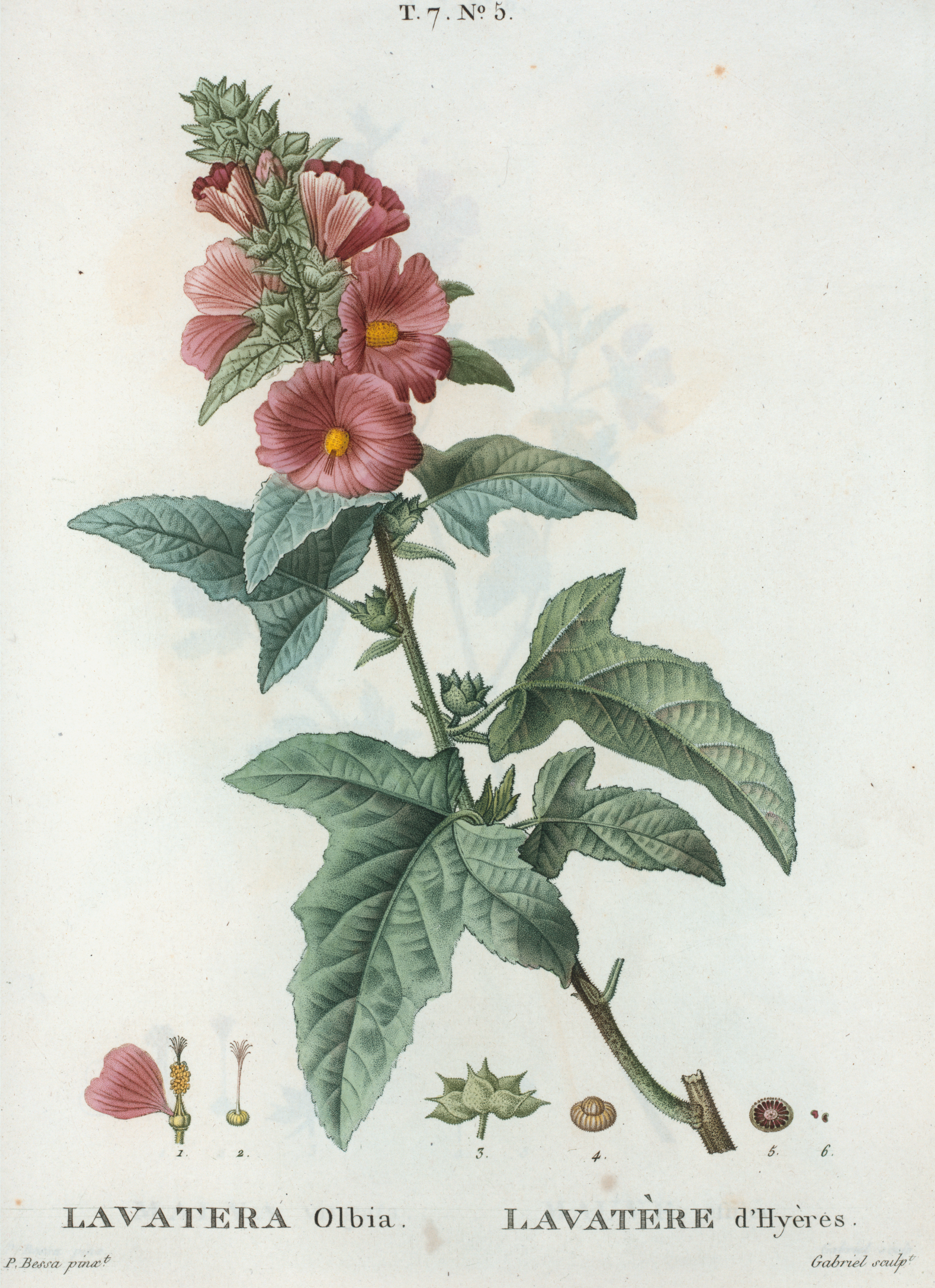
- Botanical illustration

Scientific classification
- Kingdom: Plantae
- Clade: Tracheophytes
- Clade: Angiosperms
- Clade: Eudicots
- Clade: Rosids
- Order: Malvales
- Family: Malvaceae
- Genus: Malva
- Species: M. olbia

Binomial name
- Malva olbia (L.) Alef.

Synonyms
- List: Althaea hispida (Desf.) Borbás; Althaea olbia (L.) Kuntze; Lavatera acutifolia Lam.; Lavatera hispida Desf.; Lavatera olbia L.; Lavatera olbia var. genuina Godr.; Lavatera olbia var. hirsutissima Rouy; Lavatera olbia var. hispida (Desf.) Ball; Lavatera olbia subsp. hispida (Desf.) Arcang.; Lavatera olbia proles hispida (Desf.) Samp.; Lavatera olbia var. intermedia Rouy; Lavatera olbia subsp. unguiculata Arcang.; Lavatera pseudo-olbia Poir.; Lavatera pseudo-olbia Desf.; Lavatera thuringiaca All.; Lavatera undulata Desf.; Malva hispida Alef.; Malva pallida Salisb.; Malva pseudo-olbia Alef.; Olbia hastata Medik.; Olbia hispida C.Presl

= Malva olbia =

Species of plant

Malva olbia (previously known as Lavatera olbia), the garden tree mallow, is a species of flowering plant in the family Malvaceae. It is native to the western Mediterranean, and has been introduced to California. A vigorous perennial shrub reaching 2.5 m (8 ft), the Royal Horticultural Society considers it to be a good plant to attract pollinators.

== Cultivars ==
It has a number of commercially available cultivars, which may be hybrids with Malva thuringiaca, dubbed Malva × clementii. The cultivars 'Rosea' and 'Red Rum' have gained the Royal Horticultural Society's Award of Garden Merit. Other cultivars include 'Barnsley' (with white aging to shell pink flowers), 'Lilac Lady', 'Eye Catcher', 'Pink Frills', 'Wembdon Variegated', and 'Saxtead'.
