= Joachim François Philibert Feisthamel =

French entomologist (1791–1851)

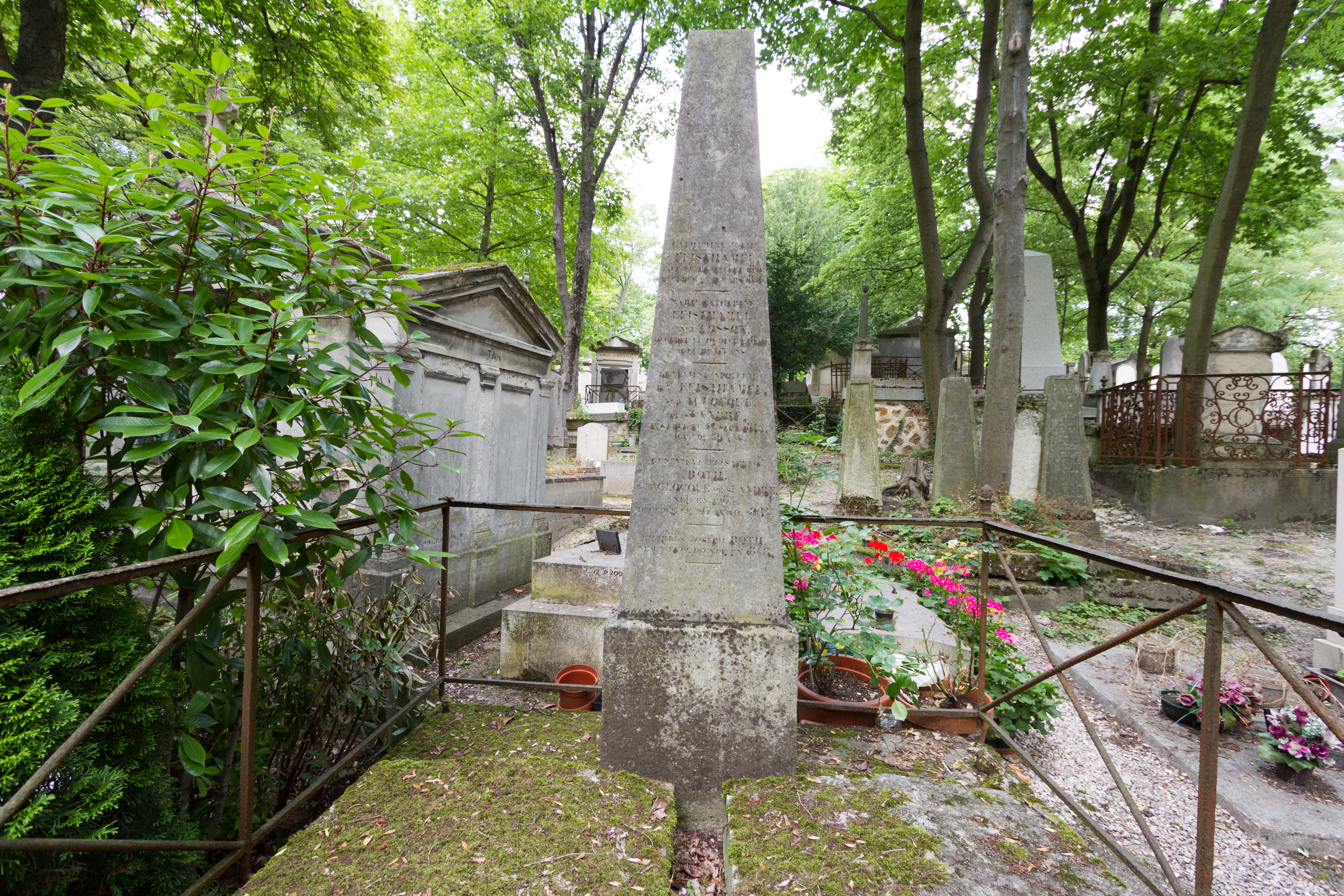
Tomb of Feisthamel

Baron Joachim-François Philibert Julien de Feisthamel (15 February 1791 – 17 January 1851) was a French entomologist.

Born in Dieuze, Baron Joachim de Feisthamel was a soldier, variously a major d'infanterie, colonel then maréchal de camp. He was a Member of the Société Entomologique de France and a Chevalier (Knight) of the Legion of Honour. He died in Paris.

== Works ==
partial list

- 1835 Heliconia leprieuri Annales de la Société Entomologique de France 4:631–632, plate 18
- 1839. Supplement a la zoologie du voyage de la Favorite comprenant la description de lepidopteres nouveaux. Mag. Zool. 9:17–26; 10 plates. [Reprinted in 1840: 13 pp., 10 pls. Paris: Bertrand] (Supplement to Laplace, Cyrille Pierre Theodore Voyage autour du monde par les mers de l'Inde et de Chine : execute sur la corvette de l'etat La Favorite pendant les annees 1830, 1831 et 1832 sous le commandement de M. Laplace capitaine de fregate Paris Imprimerie Royale, 1833–1839)
- 1850. Description de quelques Lépidoptères Rhopalocéres nouveaux ou peu connus, provenant de la Cazamance (Afrique) Annales de la Société Entomologique de France (2) 8 : 247–262
- several papers on Coleoptera in Magasin de Zoologie and Annales de la Société Entomologique de France

The butterfly Iphiclides feisthamelii was named in his honour.
