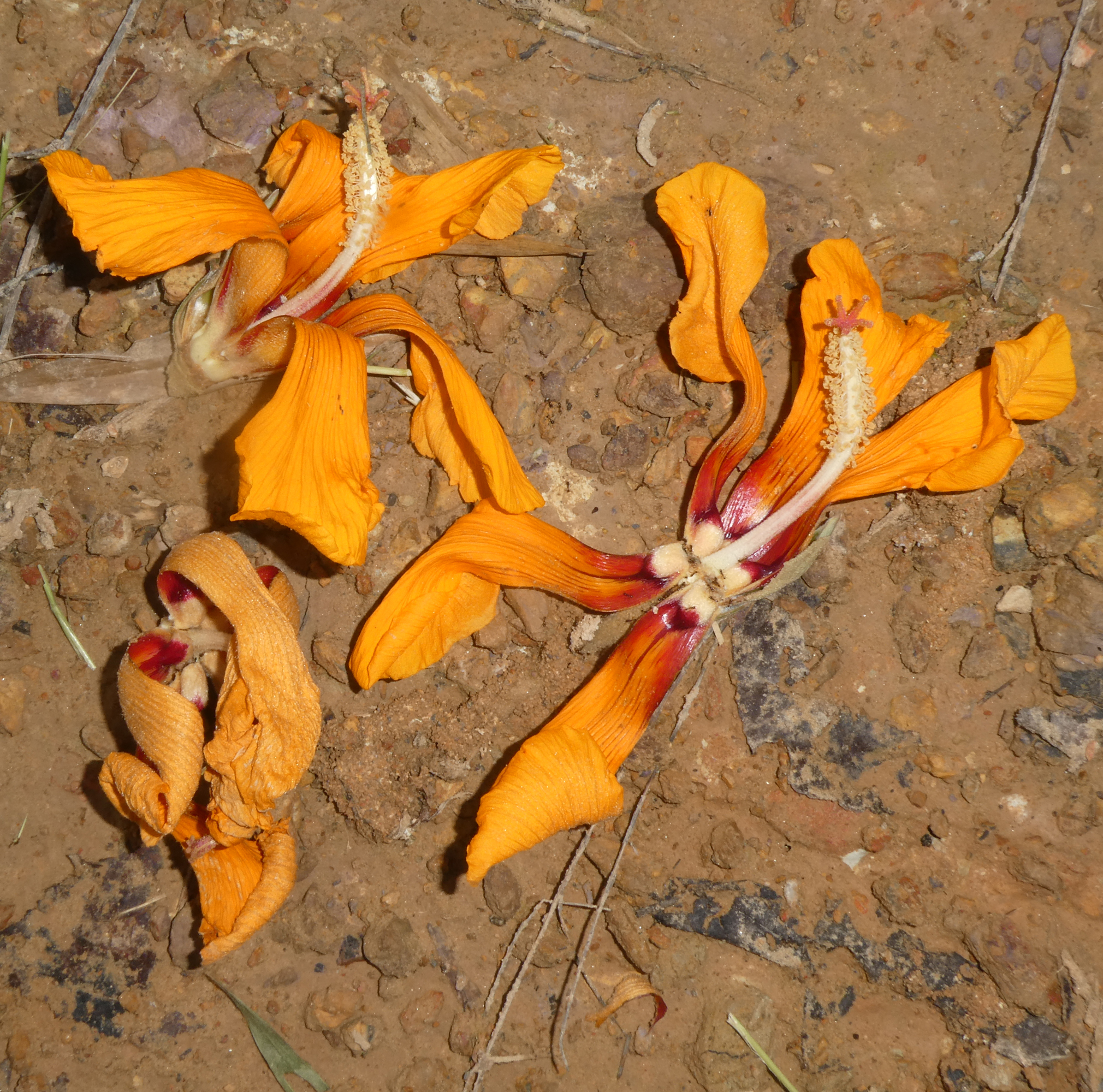
- Fallen flowers in Cát Tiên National Park

Scientific classification
- Kingdom: Plantae
- Clade: Tracheophytes
- Clade: Angiosperms
- Clade: Eudicots
- Clade: Rosids
- Order: Malvales
- Family: Malvaceae
- Subfamily: Malvoideae
- Tribe: Hibisceae
- Genus: Hibiscus
- Species: H. mesnyi

Binomial name
- Hibiscus mesnyi Pierre ex Lanness., 1888

= Hibiscus mesnyi =

Species of tree

Hibiscus mesnyi is a deciduous, riverine, tropical forest tree, endemic to Vietnam, in the family Malvaceae.

== Location and description ==
Pierre's original description notes that this tree "inhabits the Dong Nai basin and its tributary the Song Be," which appears to remain its known distribution. Pierre described the species as a tree of 8–12 metres (26–39 ft) height, growing in large groups. Also named "Paritium", this species was thought to be peculiar in that its "bracteoles are quite often deciduous, and that their attachment is such that the apical lobes must be considered as clefts. This character largely distinguishes it from [the similar] "H. floccossus" Mast., inhabiting the Malay Peninsula [now also recorded from Thailand], which has very similar leaves."

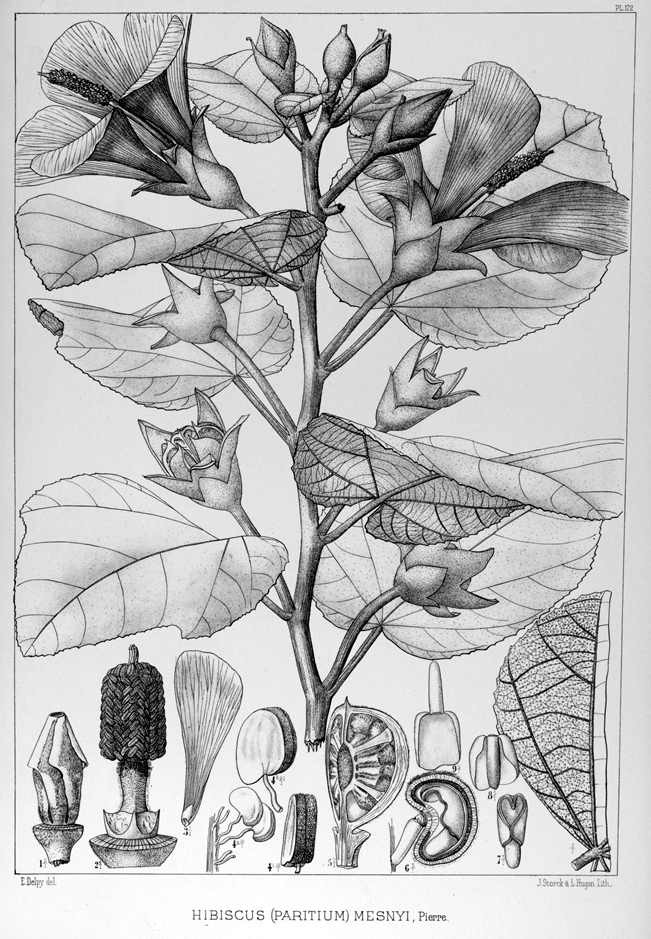
Pierre's (1888) drawing of Hibiscus mesnyi (Plate 172)

Caption:
Flowering and fruiting branches.
Young corolla in position.
Androecium of a young flower.
Adult petal.
The stamens.
Part of a ripe fruit.
Seed open and in natural position.
The isolated embryo,
The same deprived of one of its cotyledons - where the radicle has been removed from one of the cotyledons; the other having been cut.

The leaves are 60–120 mm (2.4–4.7 in) long and wide; leathery, rough and pubescent on both sides, described as "cordate 7-nerved, ovate acuminate or suborbicular, with irregular teeth or crenellations". The leaf blade is longer than the petiole, which is 10–40 mm (0.39–1.57 in) long. Axillary and solitary peduncles are longer than the petiole or arranged in a cluster at the top of the twigs. Spatulate bracteoles end in 2–3 clefts or lobes.

Flowers are orange-yellow, with petals, 90 mm (3.5 in) long, hairy outside, multi-veined, about the length of the style. Five sepals are acute, erect, and of the same length as the tube. The stamens, in young flower, form five groups consisting of 4 rows of unilocular and hippocrepiform (horseshoe-shaped) anthers; this staminal tube is hairy at the base. Styles are somewhat wider than the androecium in the mature flower. The seed capsule, 40–50 mm (1.6–2.0 in) long, is shorter than the calyx and has 5 cells, shorter than the sepals. Seeds are hispid, 10–44 per cell, arranged in two rows separated by 5–7 false lamellar partitions.

"This tree produces fibres similar to those of H. tiliaceus and H. macrophyllus, (inhabiting the same region), but its white wood is not very resistant" and was considered of little use.
