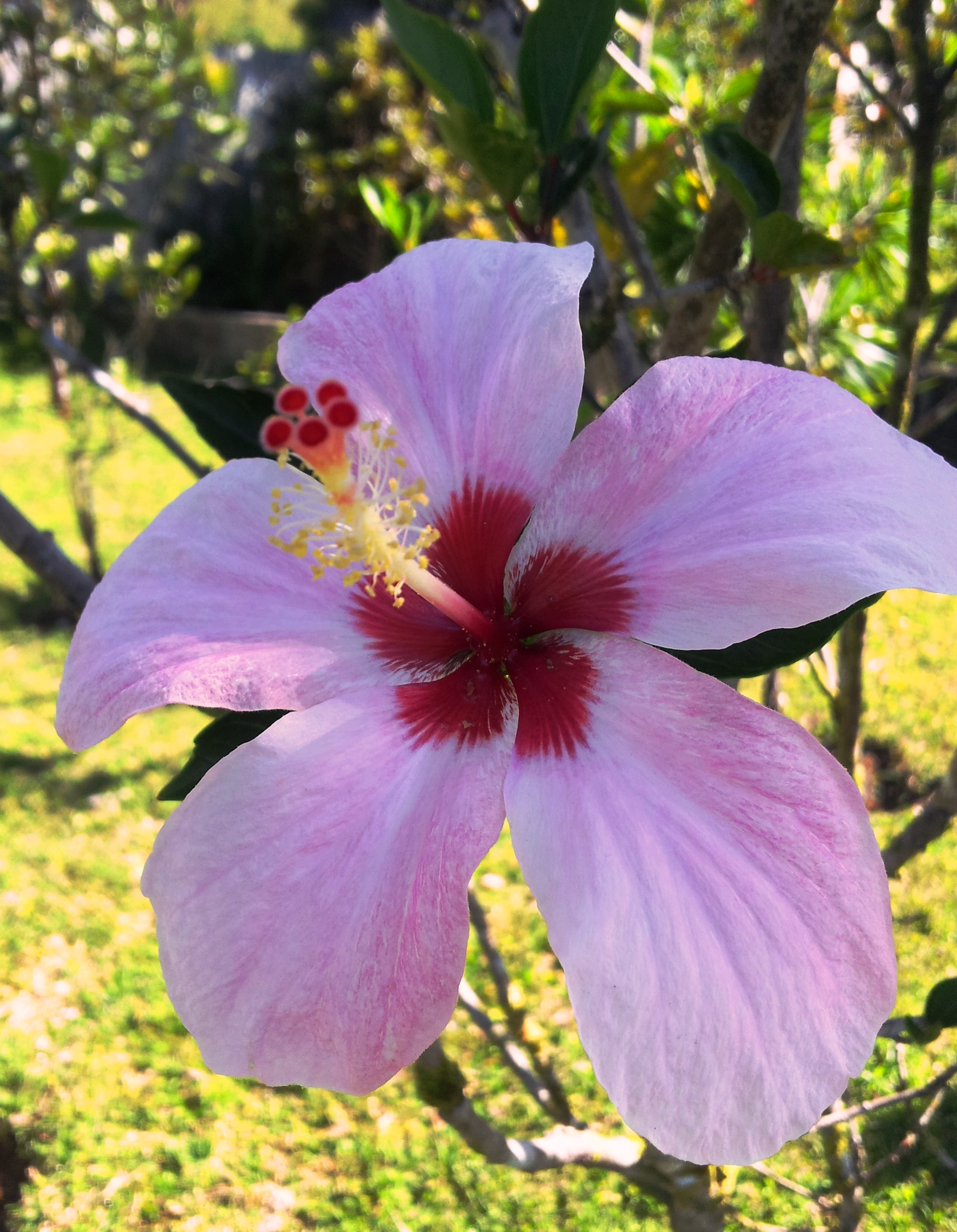
- Hibiscus genevii flower in Monvert Nature Park in Mauritius

Scientific classification
- Kingdom: Plantae
- Clade: Tracheophytes
- Clade: Angiosperms
- Clade: Eudicots
- Clade: Rosids
- Order: Malvales
- Family: Malvaceae
- Genus: Hibiscus
- Species: H. genevei

Binomial name
- Hibiscus genevei Bojer ex Hook.

= Hibiscus genevei =

Species of plant in the mallow family

Hibiscus genevei is a species of flowering plant in the Malvaceae family. It is known locally as mandrinette blanc and is endemic to the island of Mauritius.

It is one of four species of Hibiscus that are indigenous to the Mascarene islands (Mauritius, Reunion, Rodrigues), and is most closely related to Hibiscus liliiflorus of Rodrigues and Hibiscus fragilis. It was thought to be extinct for over a century, but was rediscovered in 1968. It grows as a small bush to 2–3 metres (7–10 ft) in height.
