= H. poeppigii =

H. poeppigii may refer to:

- Hibiscus poeppigii, a rose mallow
- Hypolepis poeppigii, a Neotropical fern
