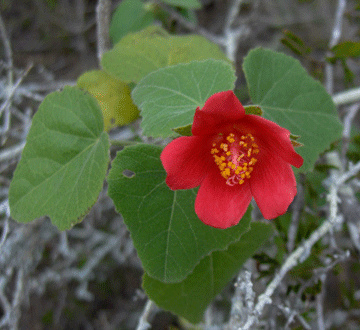
- Habit

Scientific classification
- Kingdom: Plantae
- Clade: Tracheophytes
- Clade: Angiosperms
- Clade: Eudicots
- Clade: Rosids
- Order: Malvales
- Family: Malvaceae
- Genus: Hibiscus
- Species: H. martianus

Binomial name
- Hibiscus martianus Zucc.

Synonyms
- Hibiscus cardiophyllus A.Gray

= Hibiscus martianus =

Species of plant

Hibiscus martianus, the heartleaf rosemallow or heart-leaf hibiscus, is a species of flowering plant in the family Malvaceae, native to Texas and Mexico. In the wild it is found growing in a variety of harsh habitats, including in canyons, on scree and gravel, and in the chaparral.

A perennial 1 to 3 ft (0.3 to 0.9 m) tall with spectacular red flowers that attract both butterflies and hummingbirds, it blooms year-round if there is no frost. It is highly heat and drought tolerant and is recommended for xeriscaping.
