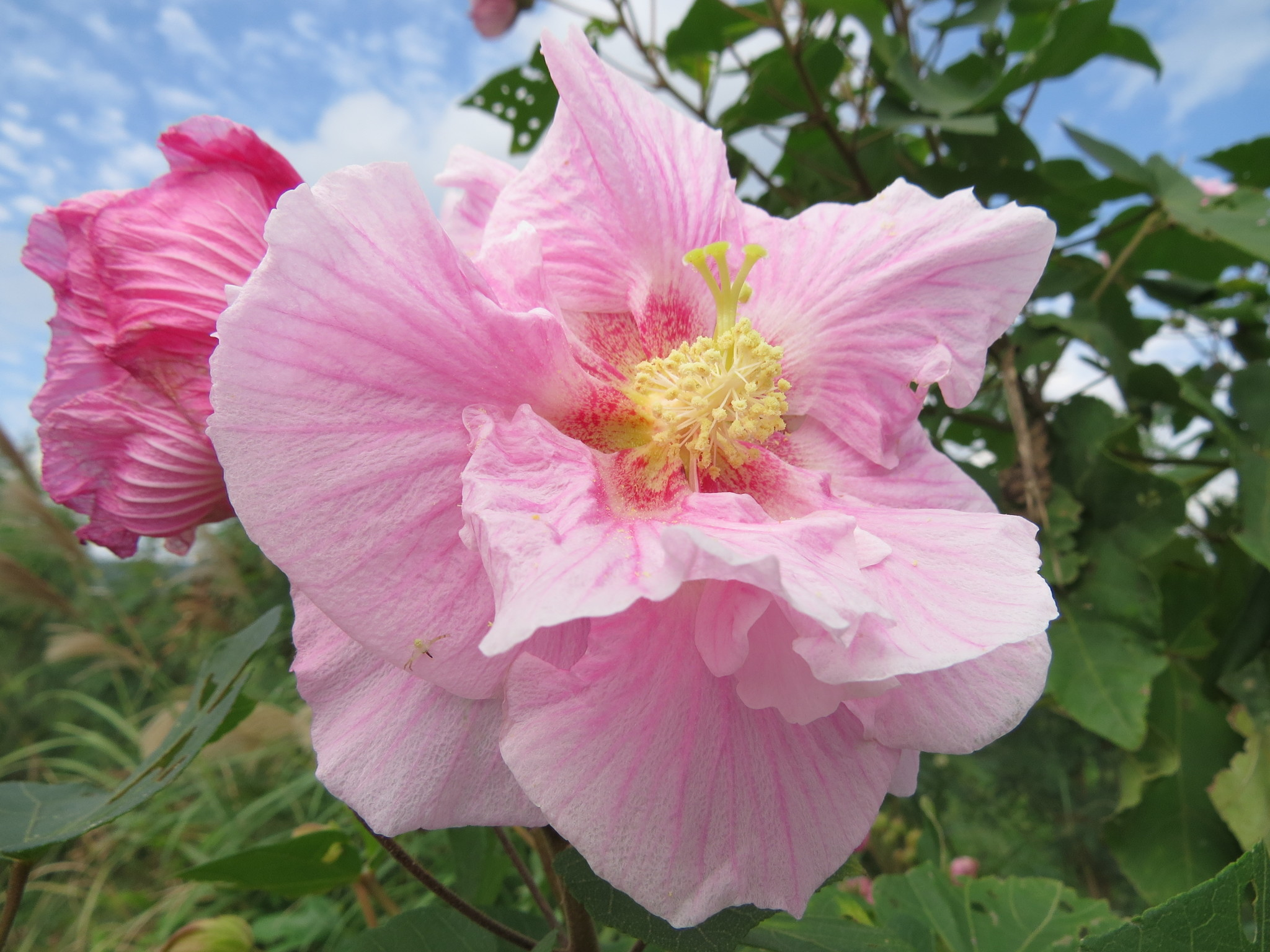

Scientific classification
- Kingdom: Plantae
- Clade: Tracheophytes
- Clade: Angiosperms
- Clade: Eudicots
- Clade: Rosids
- Order: Malvales
- Family: Malvaceae
- Genus: Hibiscus
- Species: H. makinoi

Binomial name
- Hibiscus makinoi Jotani & Ohba

= Hibiscus makinoi =

Species of flowering plant

Hibiscus makinoi, commonly known as the Okinawan Hibiscus or Makino's Mallow, is a species of Hibiscus native to the coast in Japan from the Ryukyu Islands to western Kyushu, as well as eastern to southern Taiwan.
