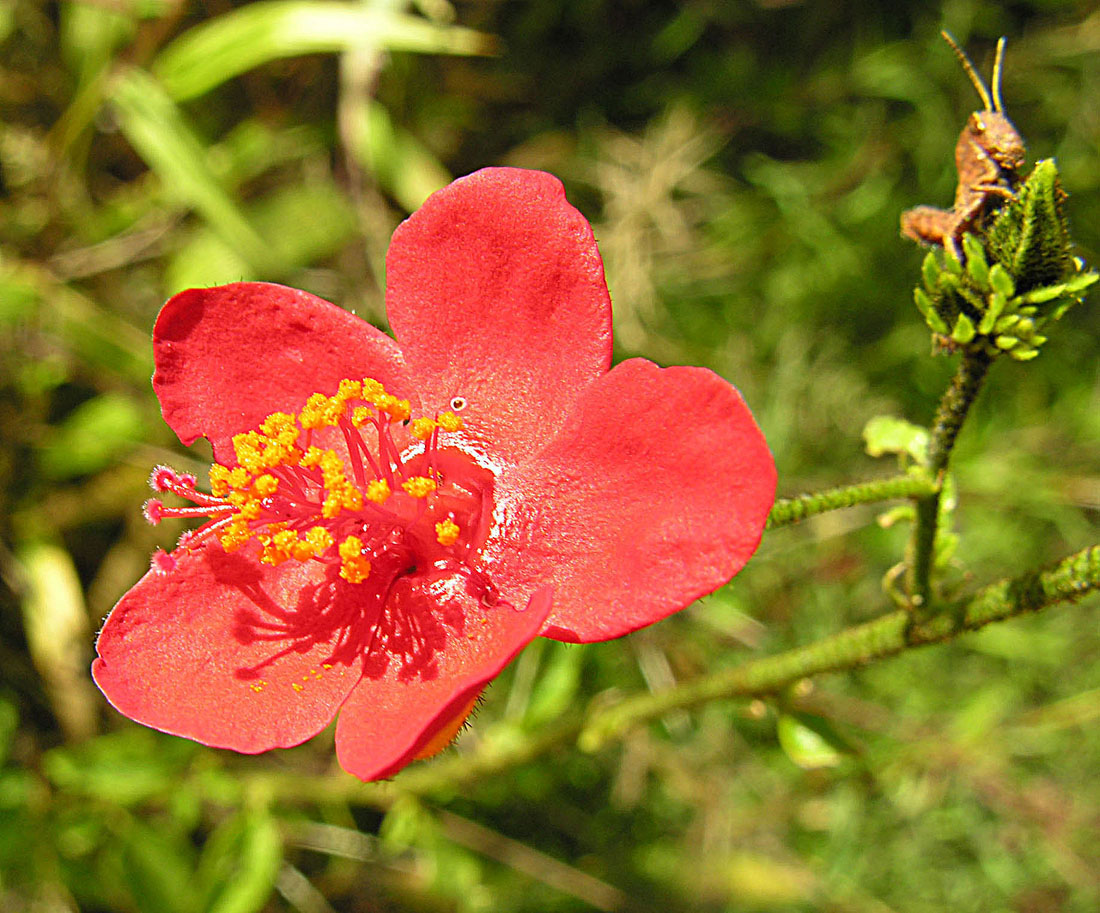

Scientific classification
- Kingdom: Plantae
- Clade: Embryophytes
- Clade: Tracheophytes
- Clade: Angiosperms
- Clade: Eudicots
- Clade: Rosids
- Order: Malvales
- Family: Malvaceae
- Genus: Hibiscus
- Species: H. aponeurus

Binomial name
- Hibiscus aponeurus Sprague & Hutch.

= Hibiscus aponeurus =

Species of flowering plant

Hibiscus aponeurus is a species of Hibiscus. It can grow up to 1.5 m (4 ft 11 in) tall and has red flowers and capsule fruit. It is native to eastern tropical Africa, ranging from Mozambique to Djibouti, and to Yemen on the southeastern Arabian Peninsula.
