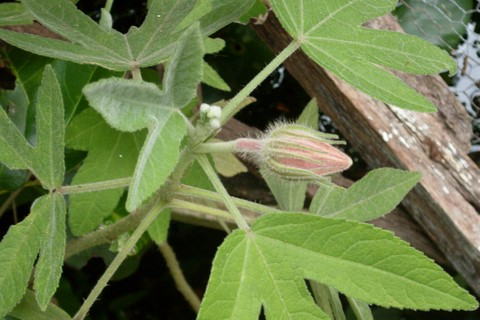

Scientific classification
- Kingdom: Plantae
- Clade: Tracheophytes
- Clade: Angiosperms
- Clade: Eudicots
- Clade: Rosids
- Order: Malvales
- Family: Malvaceae
- Genus: Hibiscus
- Species: H. splendens

Binomial name
- Hibiscus splendens Fraser ex Graham

Synonyms
- Abelmoschus splendens Walp.

= Hibiscus splendens =

Splendid hibiscus

Species of tree

Hibiscus splendens, the splendid hibiscus, is a species of flowering shrub or tree in the mallow family, Malvaceae. Other common names include hollyhock tree and pink cottonwood. H. splendens is a fairly common plant native to eastern Australia. The range of natural distribution is from Wollongong (35° S) in the state of New South Wales to Blackdown Tableland National Park (23° S) in central east Queensland. The habitat is on clearings or disturbances around the margins of the drier rainforests.

== Description ==
A bush or small tree up to 6 metres tall and 7 cm in trunk diameter. The cylindrical trunk is covered in sharp prickles, as is most of the plant. Leaves are 7 to 20 cm long. Being toothed, heart shaped with a fine point at the tip. Leaves are simple or with three to five lobes, arranged alternatively on the stem. The mid rib and lateral veins are visible on both sides of the leaf.

The spectacular pink coloured flowers are around 7 cm long, appearing in the months of October to December. The species name "splendens" refers to the beauty of the flower.

The fruit is an egg shaped capsule, covered in hairs. Five cells within the capsule contain pyramid shaped dark seeds, 3 to 4 mm long. The hairs on the capsules can cause severe skin irritation and need to be handled with care. Fruit matures from December to February. Being a rainforest regeneration plant, germination from seed is easily achieved, and cuttings strike well.

== Uses ==
An attractive garden plant.

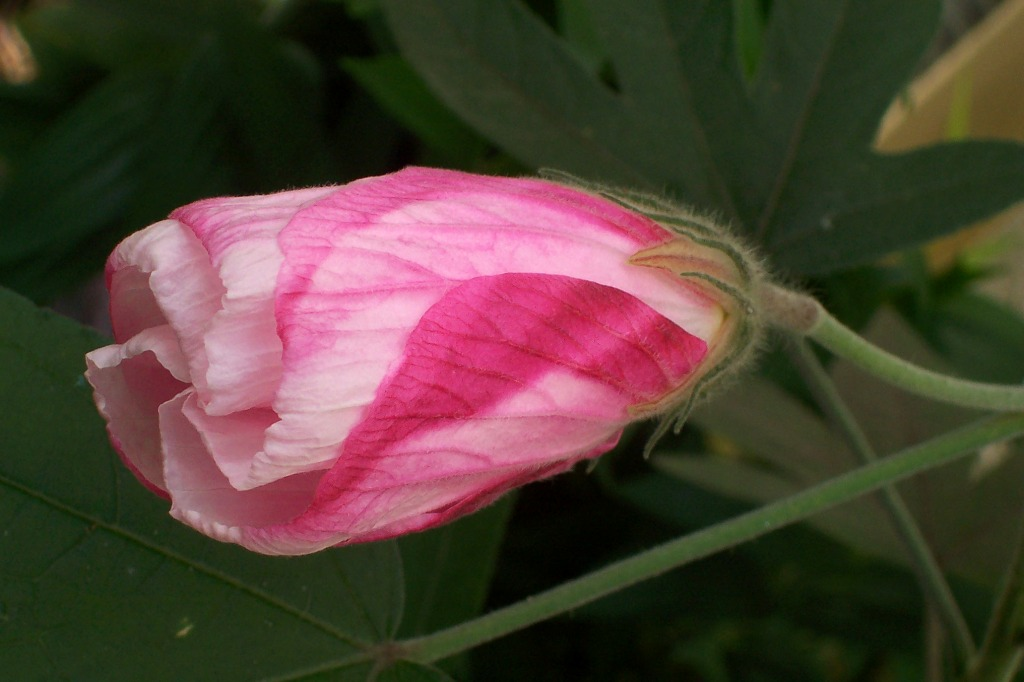
Flower
