= Hibiscus diriffan =

Conservation status
- Least Concern (IUCN 3.1)

Scientific classification
- Kingdom: Plantae
- Clade: Tracheophytes
- Clade: Angiosperms
- Clade: Eudicots
- Clade: Rosids
- Order: Malvales
- Family: Malvaceae
- Genus: Hibiscus
- Species: H. diriffan

Binomial name
- Hibiscus diriffan A.G.Mill.

Species of flowering plant

Hibiscus diriffan is a species of flowering plant in the family Malvaceae. It is endemic to the island of Socotra in Yemen. It grows on the southern limestone plateaus from Diksam to Wadi Irih and northwards to the granite of the Hajhir Mountains, from 20 to 1,300 metres elevation.

It is similar to H. quattenensis, and is distinguished by narrower leaves with a distinctly cordate base and crenate to lobed margins, and densely stellate-hairy rather than glabrescent pedicels, epicalyx, and calyx.
