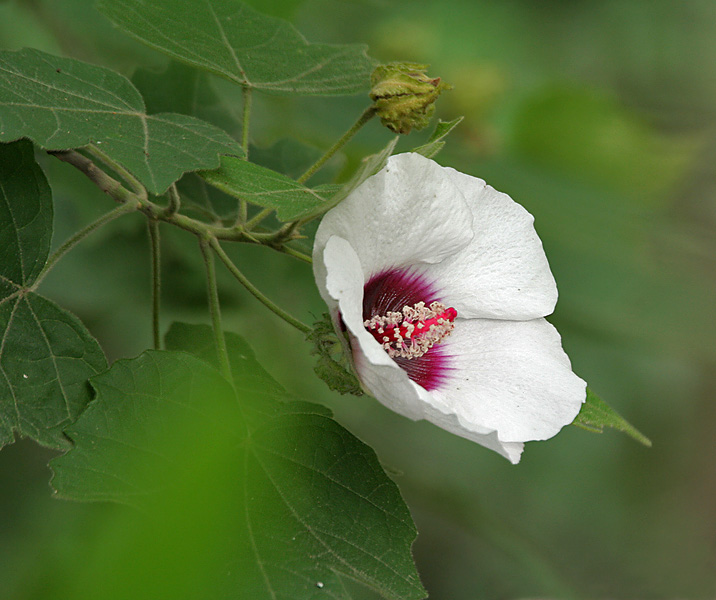

Scientific classification
- Kingdom: Plantae
- Clade: Tracheophytes
- Clade: Angiosperms
- Clade: Eudicots
- Clade: Rosids
- Order: Malvales
- Family: Malvaceae
- Genus: Hibiscus
- Species: H. platanifolius

Binomial name
- Hibiscus platanifolius (Willd.) Sweet

Synonyms
- Hibiscus collinus Roxb.; Hibiscus eriocarpus DeCandolle; Hibiscus gossypinus Baill.; Pavonia platanifolia Willd.

= Hibiscus platanifolius =

Species of flowering plant

Hibiscus platanifolius, the maple-leaved mallow, is a species of flowering tree in the mallow family, Malvaceae, that is native to the India and Sri Lanka. In Sri Lankan texts, the plant is widely known by its synonym H. eriocarpus. The tree is about 8m tall. Leaves are cordate at base; hairy; trilobed. Flowers show axillary panicles where flowers show typical Hibiscus flower colors, pink with dark center. Fruit is a capsule.

== Common names ==
- Kannada - Bili daasavaala, Daasaala, Daasaani
- Telugu - Kondabenda, Kondagogu, Kondajana punara
