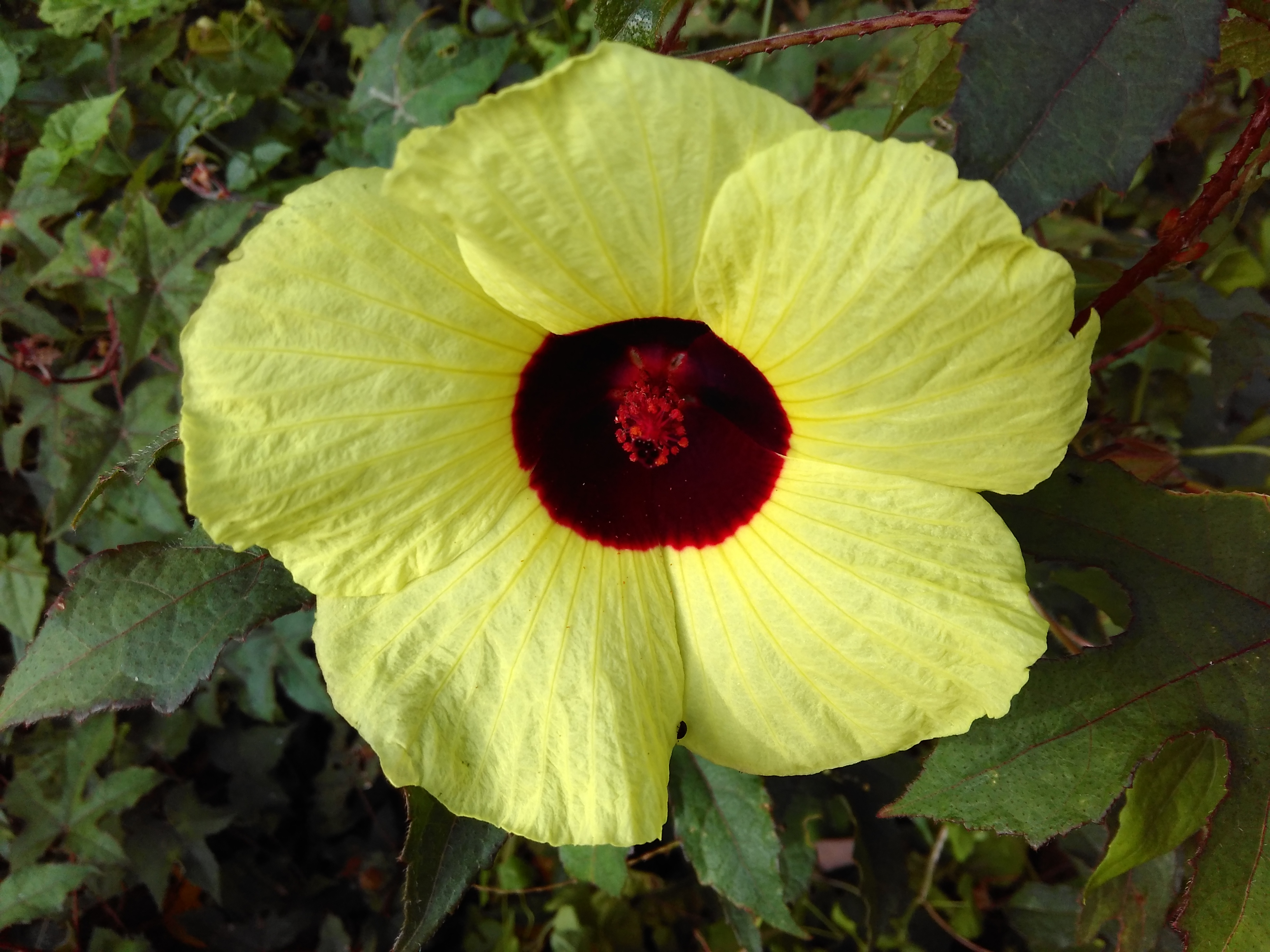

Scientific classification
- Kingdom: Plantae
- Clade: Tracheophytes
- Clade: Angiosperms
- Clade: Eudicots
- Clade: Rosids
- Order: Malvales
- Family: Malvaceae
- Genus: Hibiscus
- Species: H. hispidissimus

Binomial name
- Hibiscus hispidissimus Griff.

Synonyms
- Furcaria furcellata Ulbr.; Furcaria roxburghii Kostel.; Hibiscus aculeatus Roxb.; Hibiscus furcatus Roxb. ex DC.; Hibiscus hamatus E.Mey. ex Harv.

= Hibiscus hispidissimus =

Species of flowering plant

Hibiscus hispidissimus is a species of flowering plant in the family Malvaceae. It is found in South East Asia.
