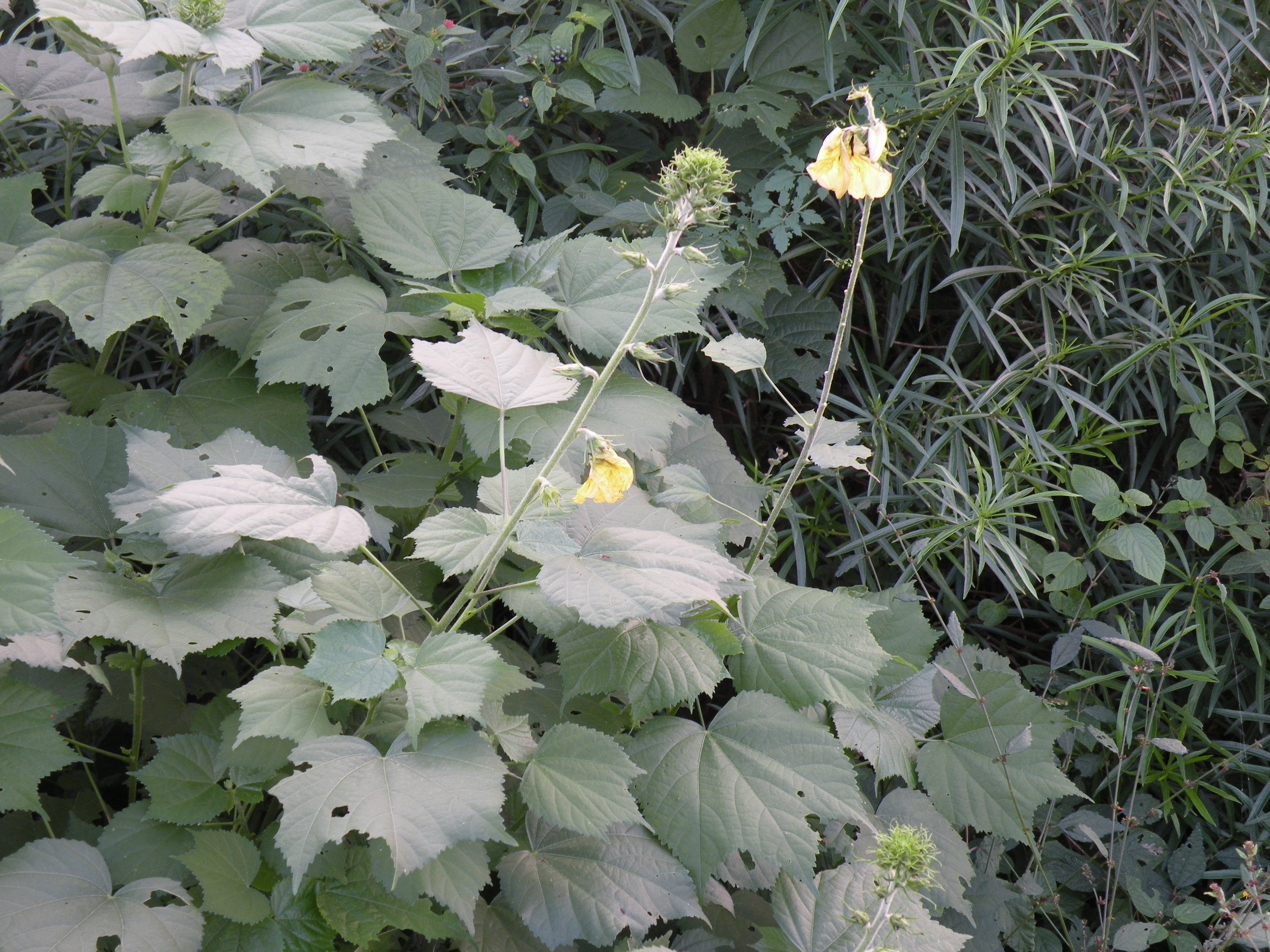

Scientific classification
- Kingdom: Plantae
- Clade: Tracheophytes
- Clade: Angiosperms
- Clade: Eudicots
- Clade: Rosids
- Order: Malvales
- Family: Malvaceae
- Genus: Hibiscus
- Species: H. lunariifolius

Binomial name
- Hibiscus lunariifolius Willd.

Synonyms
- List: Cotyloplecta dongolensis Alef.; Cotyloplecta macrantha Alef.; Hibiscus petiolosus Miq.; Hibiscus pruriens Willd. ex Hornem.; Hibiscus racemosus Lindl.

= Hibiscus lunariifolius =

Species of plant in the mallow family

Hibiscus lunariifolius, the lunaria-leaf hibiscus, is a species of flowering plant in the family Malvaceae, native to India and Sri Lanka, and introduced to quite a number of seasonally dry tropical areas in Africa. It is cultivated in Nigeria for its fiber, a good quality analog of jute.
