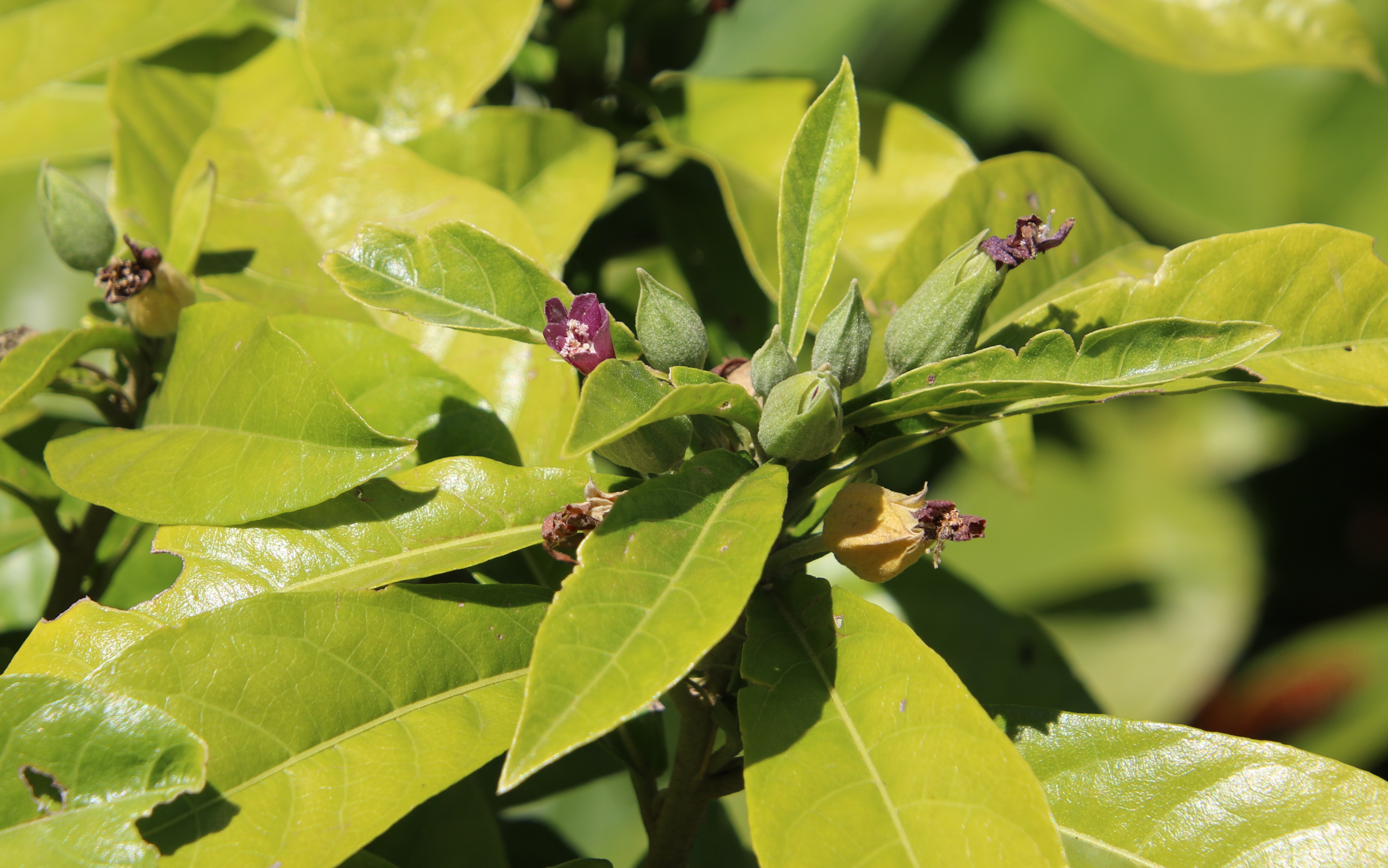
- Royal Botanic Gardens, Sydney

Scientific classification
- Kingdom: Plantae
- Clade: Tracheophytes
- Clade: Angiosperms
- Clade: Eudicots
- Clade: Rosids
- Order: Malvales
- Family: Malvaceae
- Genus: Hibiscus
- Species: H. tozerensis

Binomial name
- Hibiscus tozerensis Craven & B.E.Pfeil

Synonyms
- Macrostelia grandifolia

= Hibiscus tozerensis =

Iron Range hibiscus

Species of flowering plant

Hibiscus tozerensis, the Iron Range hibiscus, is shrub to small tree, growing from one to six metres tall. Found in the Iron Range, Queensland, Australia.
