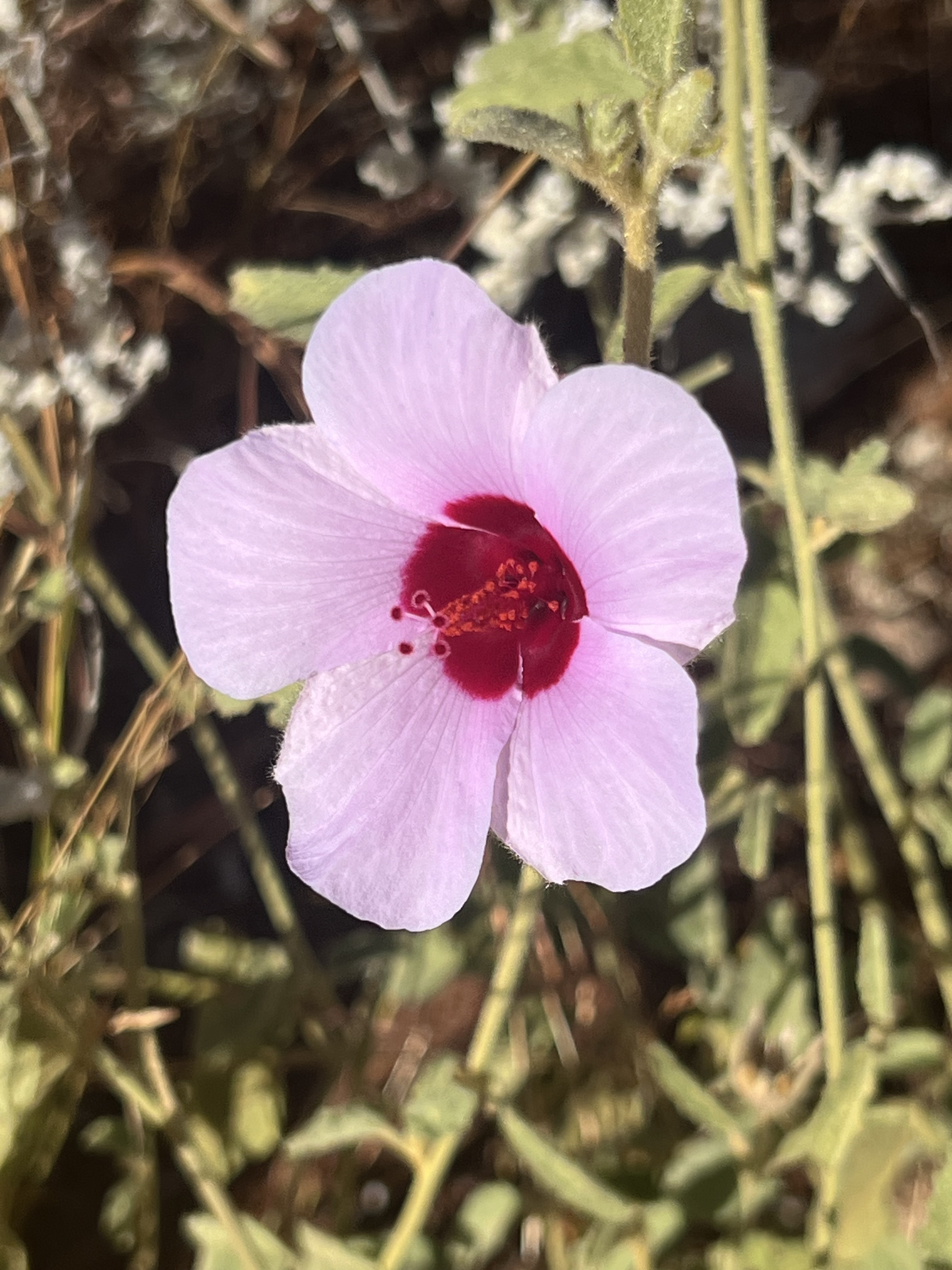

Scientific classification
- Kingdom: Plantae
- Clade: Tracheophytes
- Clade: Angiosperms
- Clade: Eudicots
- Clade: Rosids
- Order: Malvales
- Family: Malvaceae
- Genus: Hibiscus
- Species: H. sturtii

Binomial name
- Hibiscus sturtii Hook.

= Hibiscus sturtii =

Hill hibiscus

Species of plant

Hibiscus sturtii commonly known as "hill hibiscus", is a flowering plant in the family Malvaceae. It is a small shrub with pink, mauve or white flowers, hairy grey-green leaves and is endemic to Australia. Two forms are recognized; var. sturtii and var. muelleri.

== Description ==
Hibiscus sturtii is a small understory shrub to 60 cm (24 in) high, occasionally prostrate, grey-green leaves thickly covered in star-shaped hairs, egg to lance-shaped or oblong-lance shaped, 2–5 cm (0.79–1.97 in) long, rounded at the apex and the petiole 4–18 mm (0.16–0.71 in) long. The pink, mauve or white flower petals may have a dark basal spot, corolla 1.5–2.5 cm (0.59–0.98 in) long, calyx lobes lance or triangular shaped, 8–13 mm (0.31–0.51 in) long and the peduncle 6–33 mm (0.24–1.30 in) long. Flowering occurs from autumn to spring and the fruit is a densely hairy globular capsule 8–10 mm (0.31–0.39 in) long.

== Taxonomy and naming ==
Hibiscus sturtii was first formally described in 1848 by William Jackson Hooker and the description was published in Journal of an Expedition into the Interior of Tropical Australia. The specific epithet (sturtii) is in honour of explorer Charles Napier Sturt.

== Distribution and habitat ==
Hill hibiscus grows in a variety of soils and locations on mainland Australia except Victoria.
