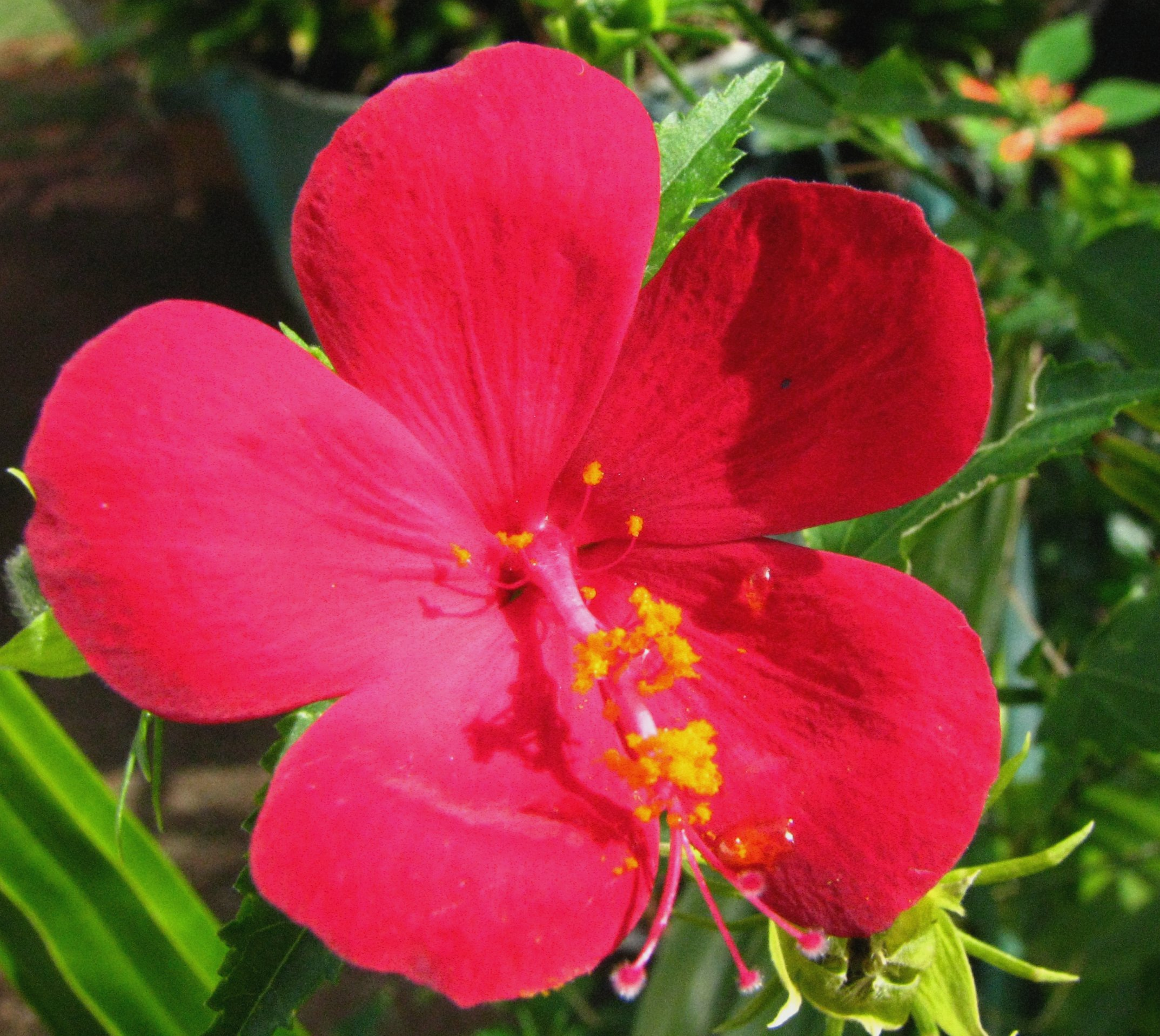

Scientific classification
- Kingdom: Plantae
- Clade: Tracheophytes
- Clade: Angiosperms
- Clade: Eudicots
- Clade: Rosids
- Order: Malvales
- Family: Malvaceae
- Genus: Hibiscus
- Species: H. phoeniceus

Binomial name
- Hibiscus phoeniceus Jacq., 1776

Synonyms
- Bombycella phoenicea (Jacq.) Bello, 1881.; Bombix phoenicea (Jacq.) Moench, 1794.; Hibiscus brasiliensis var. genuinus Hochr., 1900.

= Hibiscus phoeniceus =

Species of flowering plant

Hibiscus phoeniceus is a species of Hibiscus found from Central to South America.
