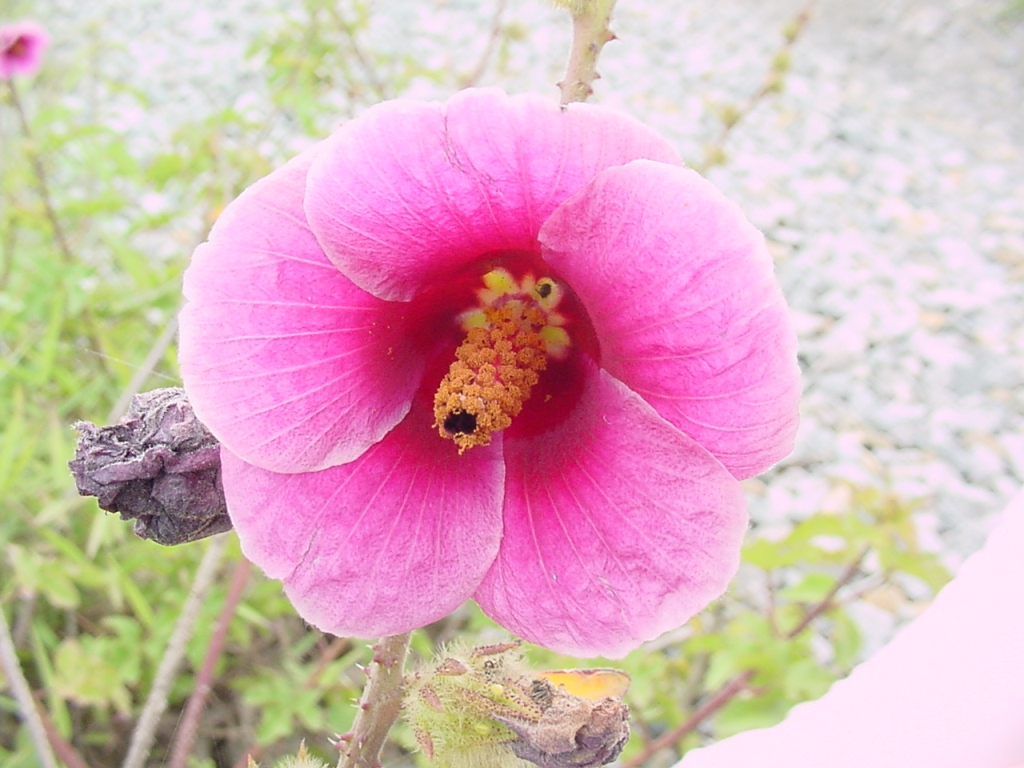

Scientific classification
- Kingdom: Plantae
- Clade: Tracheophytes
- Clade: Angiosperms
- Clade: Eudicots
- Clade: Rosids
- Order: Malvales
- Family: Malvaceae
- Genus: Hibiscus
- Species: H. striatus

Binomial name
- Hibiscus striatus Cav.

= Hibiscus striatus =

Species of flowering plant

Hibiscus striatus, the striped hibiscus or striped rosemallow, is a plant in the mallow family, Malvaceae.

== Taxonomy ==
Hibiscus striatus was given its scientific name by Antonio José Cavanilles in 1787. It is part of the genus Hibiscus in the family Malvaceae. It has two accepted subspecies:

- Hibiscus striatus subsp. lambertianus – Northern South America and southern North America
- Hibiscus striatus subsp. striatus – South America in northern Argentina, Uruguay, Bolivia, and southern Brazil

Hibiscus striatus has 19 synonyms of the species or one of its two subspecies.

Table of Synonyms
Name	Year	Rank	Synonym of:	Notes
Abelmoschus angustifolius (Hook. & Arn.) Walp.	1842	species	subsp. striatus	= het.
Abelmoschus cisplatinus (A.St.-Hil.) Walp.	1843	species	subsp. striatus	= het.
Abelmoschus cubensis (A.Rich.) Walp.	1842	species	subsp. lambertianus	= het.
Hibiscus amoenus Link & Otto	1828	species	subsp. striatus	= het.
Hibiscus angustifolius Hook. & Arn.	1833	species	subsp. striatus	= het.
Hibiscus argentinus Speg.	1901	species	subsp. striatus	= het., nom. illeg.
Hibiscus cisplatinus A.St.-Hil.	1828	species	subsp. striatus	= het.
Hibiscus cubensis A.Rich.	1841	species	subsp. lambertianus	= het.
Hibiscus domingensis var. striatus (Cav.) Willd.	1800	variety	H. striatus	≡ hom.
Hibiscus lambertianus Kunth	1822	species	subsp. lambertianus	≡ hom.
Hibiscus lambertianus var. angustifolius (Hook. & Arn.) Hochr.	1900	variety	subsp. striatus	= het.
Hibiscus lambertianus var. genuinus Hochr.	1900	variety	subsp. lambertianus	≡ hom., not validly publ.
Hibiscus lambertianus var. glaber Gürke	1892	variety	subsp. lambertianus	= het.
Hibiscus lambertianus var. lobatus Chodat & Hassl.	1905	variety	subsp. lambertianus	= het.
Hibiscus lindmanii Gürke	1896	species	subsp. striatus	= het.
Hibiscus linearis A.St.-Hil. & Naudin	1842	species	subsp. striatus	= het.
Hibiscus sagranus P.Mercier	1830	species	subsp. striatus	= het.
Hibiscus salviifolius A.St.-Hil.	1828	species	subsp. lambertianus	= het.
Hibiscus submaritimus Larrañaga	1922	species	subsp. striatus	= het.
Notes: ≡ homotypic synonym ; = heterotypic synonym
