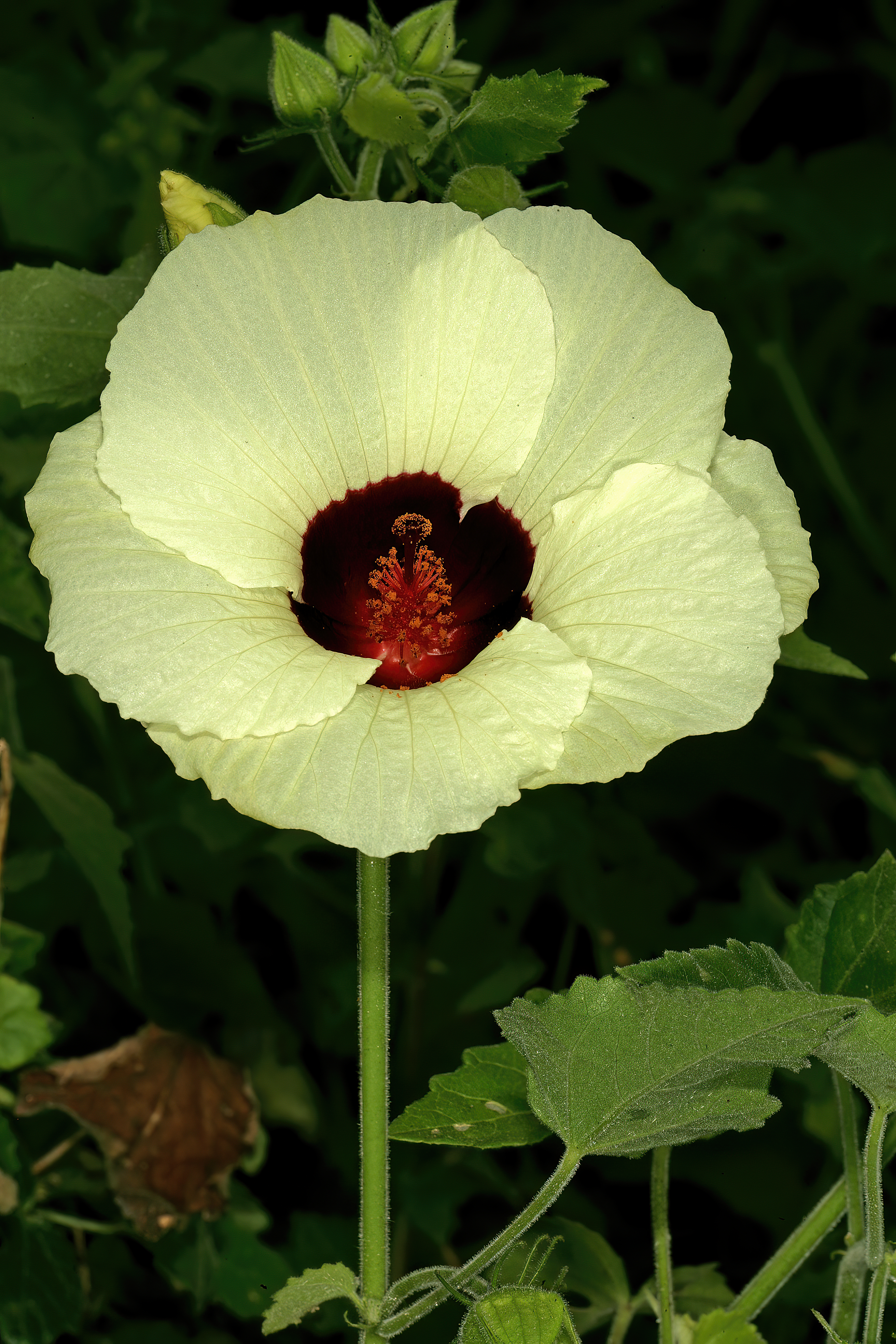
- Flower
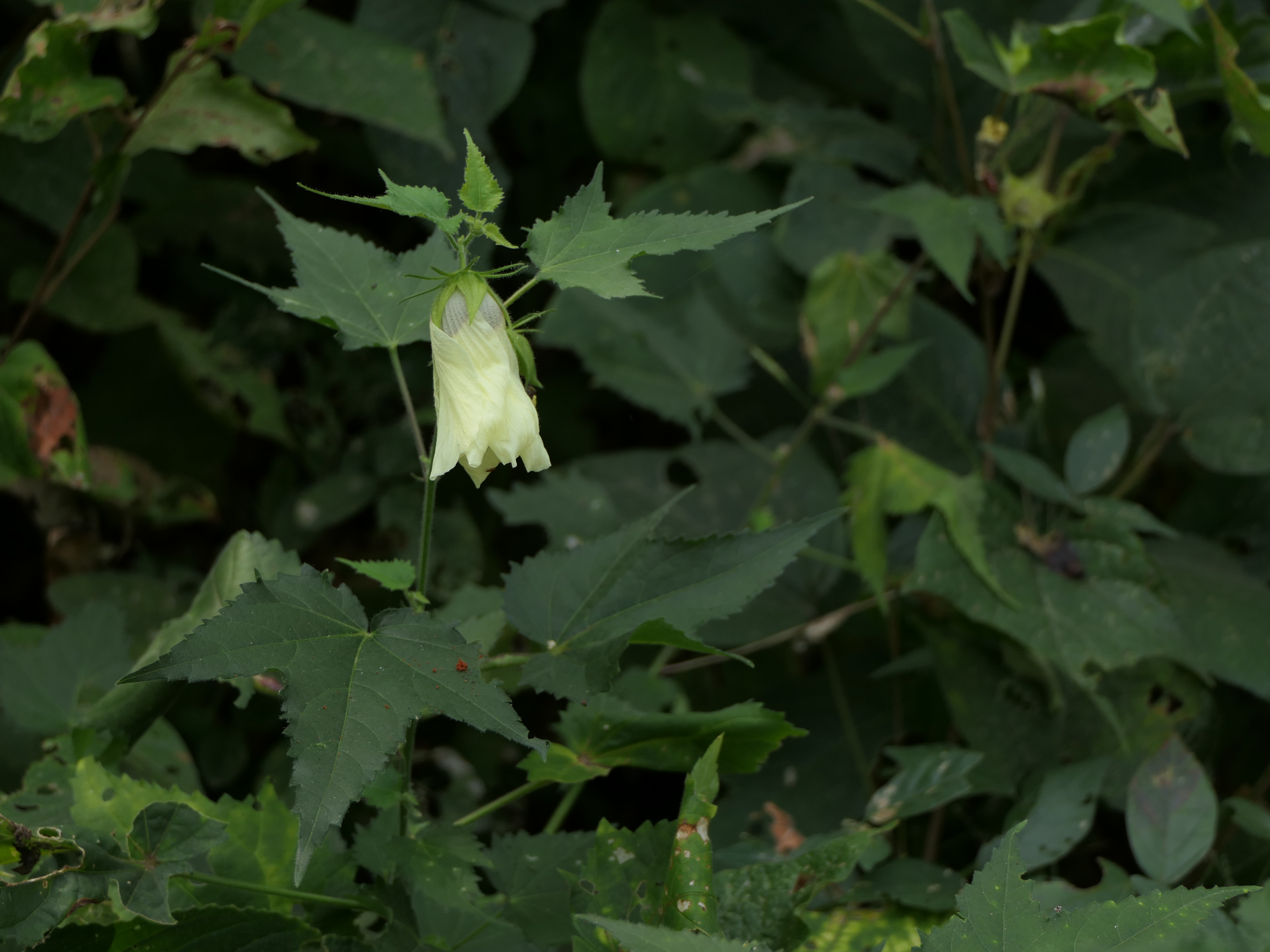
- Foliage

Scientific classification
- Kingdom: Plantae
- Clade: Tracheophytes
- Clade: Angiosperms
- Clade: Eudicots
- Clade: Rosids
- Order: Malvales
- Family: Malvaceae
- Genus: Hibiscus
- Species: H. vitifolius

Binomial name
- Hibiscus vitifolius L.

Synonyms
- List: Abelmoschus vitifolius (L.) Hassk.; Abelmoschus vitifolius var. mollis Hassk.; Fioria vitifolia (L.) Mattei; Fioria vitifolia subsp. vulgaris (Brenan & Exell) Abedin; Hibiscus cuspidatus Edgew.; Hibiscus heterotrichus DC.; Hibiscus jatrophifolius A.Rich.; Hibiscus lepidospermus Miq.; Hibiscus modaticus Hochst. ex A.Rich.; Hibiscus natalitus Harv.; Hibiscus obscurus A.Rich.; Hibiscus obtusifolius Willd.; Hibiscus ricinifolius E.Mey. ex Harv.; Hibiscus ricinoides Garcke; Hibiscus serratus Wall.; Hibiscus strigosus Schumach. & Thonn.; Hibiscus suaresensis Baill.; Hibiscus truncatus Roxb.; Hibiscus vitifolius f. americana Hochr.; Hibiscus vitifolius f. zeylanicus Hochr.; Hibiscus vitifolius subsp. vulgaris Brenan & Exell; Hibiscus vitifolius var. adhaerens Ulbr.; Hibiscus vitifolius var. genuinus Hochr.; Hibiscus vitifolius var. heterotrichus (DC.) Hochr.; Hibiscus vitifolius var. ricinifolius Hochr.; Kosteletzkya vitifolia (L.) M.R.Almeida & N.Patil

= Hibiscus vitifolius =

Species of plant in the mallow family

Hibiscus vitifolius, the grape-leaved mallow or tropical rose mallow, is a species of flowering plant in the family Malvaceae. It is native to the seasonally dry Old World tropics and subtropics, and has been introduced to the West indies. A perennial herb reaching 2 m (6 ft) and becoming woody at maturity, it is found in a wide variety of habitats, and is a weed of cultivation. It is used locally as a source of fiber, often mixed with jute.

== Description ==
The plant is a stiff and erect, growing to up to two metres, with a sometimes red-tinged stem. The leaves are broadly ovate, with a cordate or truncate base and a crenate margin. The inflorescence grows in a terminal cyme and in the leaf axils. The calyx is semi-fused. The corolla has five overlapping petals, yellow or pale lilac, with a dark red blotch at the base. The flower is followed by a pale brown capsule containing blackish, wedge-shaped seeds.

== Distribution ==
Hibiscus vitifolius is native to tropical parts of Africa, the Middle East, India and southeastern Asia. It has been introduced to most of the islands of the Caribbean.

== Habitat ==
The plant has a wide range of habitats, being found in woodland, forest clearings, grassland, bushland dominated by Acacia and Commiphora, scrubland, wasteland and roadsides, at altitudes of up to 3,000 metres (9,800 ft).

== Subtaxa ==
The following subspecies are accepted:

- Hibiscus vitifolius subsp. lukei Mwachala & Cheek – central Kenya
- Hibiscus vitifolius subsp. vitifolius – entire range
