= Hibiscus macropodus =

Conservation status
- Data Deficient (IUCN 3.1)

Scientific classification
- Kingdom: Plantae
- Clade: Tracheophytes
- Clade: Angiosperms
- Clade: Eudicots
- Clade: Rosids
- Order: Malvales
- Family: Malvaceae
- Genus: Hibiscus
- Species: H. macropodus

Binomial name
- Hibiscus macropodus Magner & Vierh.

Species of flowering plant

Hibiscus macropodus is a species of flowering plant in the family Malvaceae. It is found only in Yemen.
