= Hibiscus paramutabilis =

Scientific classification
- Kingdom: Plantae
- Clade: Tracheophytes
- Clade: Angiosperms
- Clade: Eudicots
- Clade: Rosids
- Order: Malvales
- Family: Malvaceae
- Genus: Hibiscus
- Species: H. paramutabilis

Binomial name
- Hibiscus paramutabilis L.H.Bailey

Synonyms
- Hibiscus saltuarius Hand.-Mazz.

Species of plant in the mallow family

Hibiscus paramutabilis, the everblooming Confederate rose, is a species of flowering plant in the family Malvaceae, native to southeastern China. A deciduous shrub reaching 1 to 4 m (3 to 13 ft) at maturity, in the wild it is found in scrubland, slopes, and valleys from 500 to 1,100 m (1,600 to 3,600 ft) above sea level. In the garden it is hardy to USDA zone 7a, and produces white, pink or rose‑pink flowers (depending on cultivar) that are 15 to 30 cm (6 to 12 in) wide, blooming from spring to early winter.

== Subtaxa ==
The following varieties are accepted, based solely on the lengths of their pedicels:

- Hibiscus paramutabilis var. longipedicellatus K.M.Feng – Jinxiu
- Hibiscus paramutabilis var. paramutabilis – Guangxi, Hunan, Jiangxi
