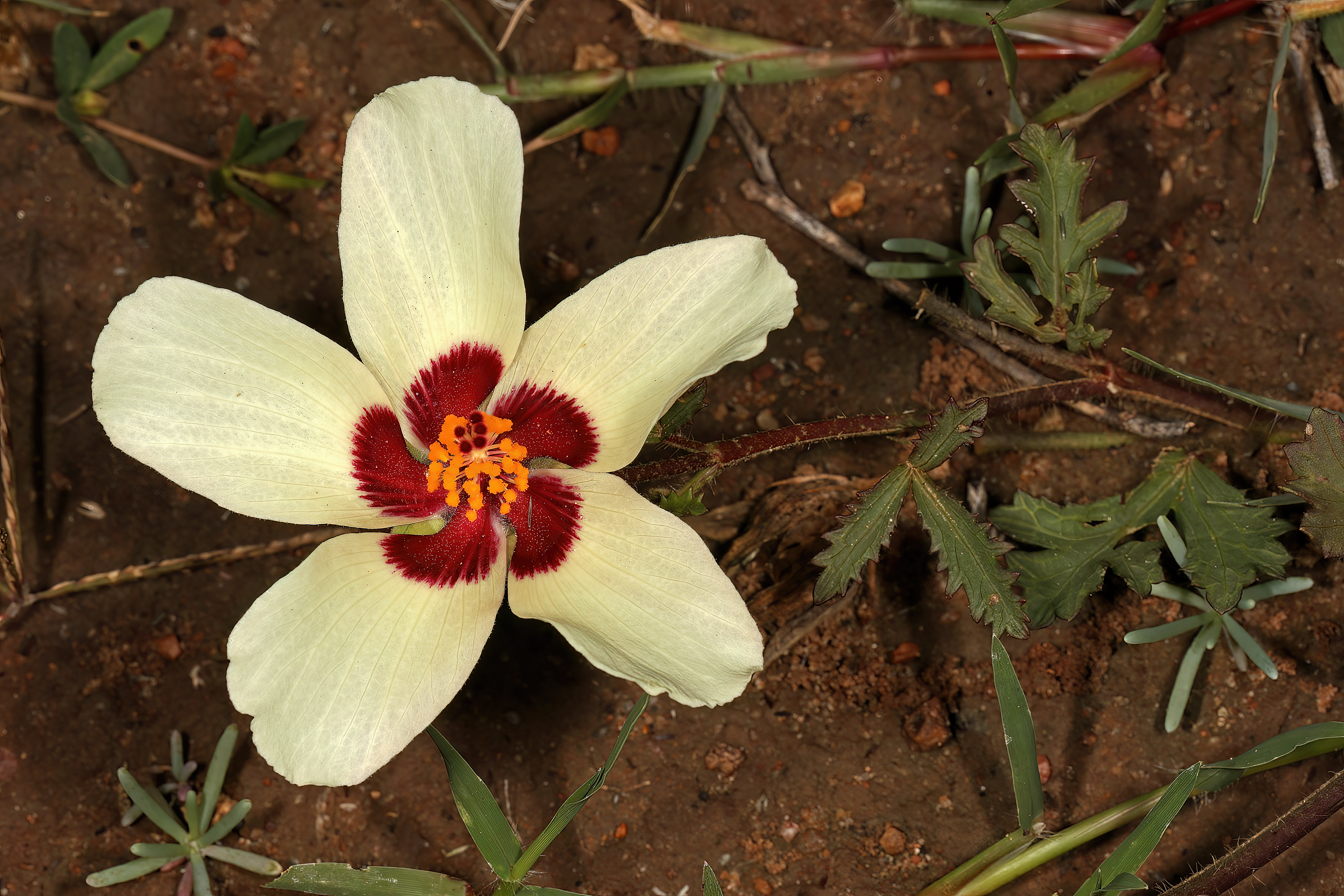
- Close-up of flower
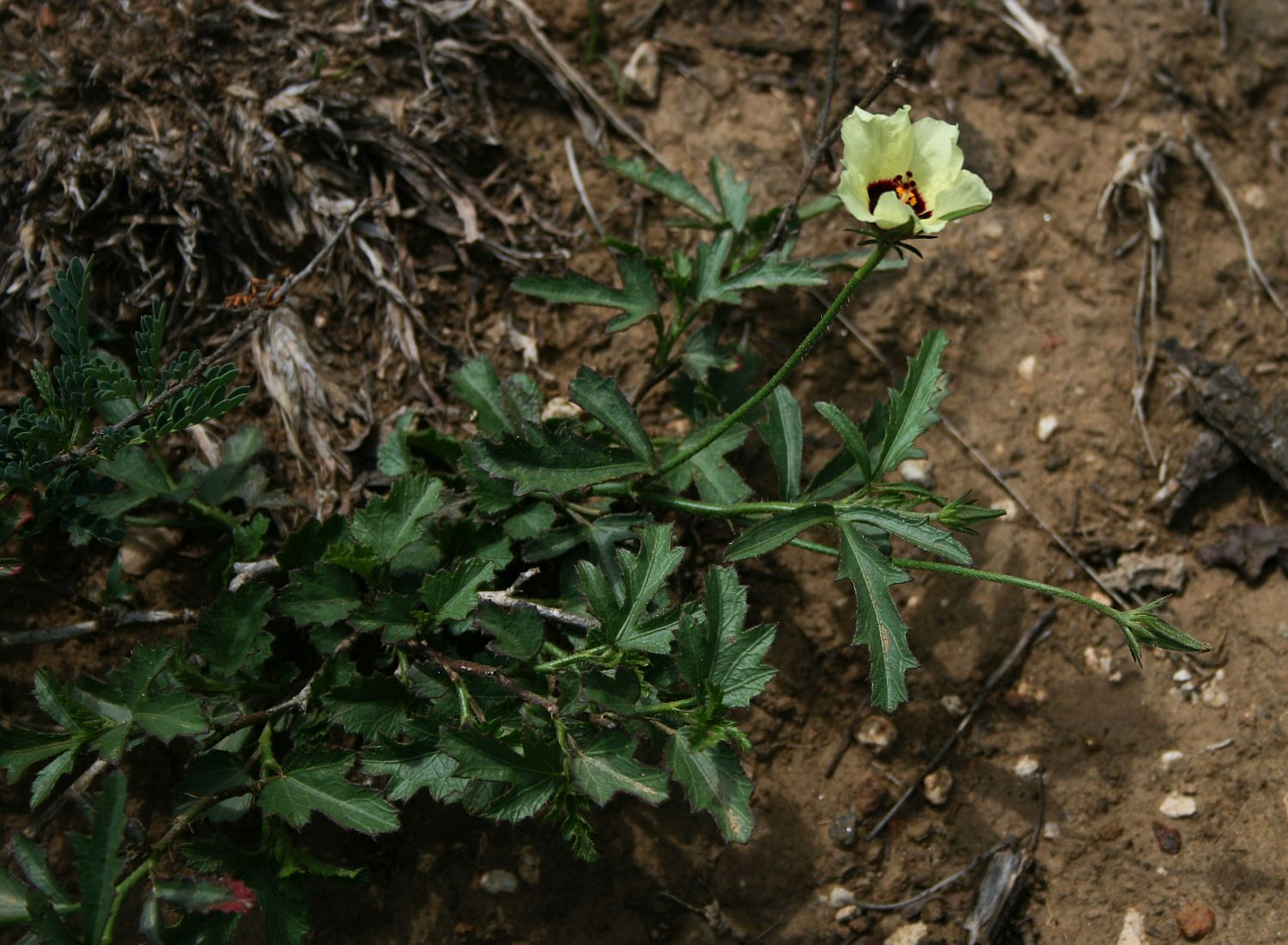
- Habit is straggling

Scientific classification
- Kingdom: Plantae
- Clade: Embryophytes
- Clade: Tracheophytes
- Clade: Spermatophytes
- Clade: Angiosperms
- Clade: Eudicots
- Clade: Rosids
- Order: Malvales
- Family: Malvaceae
- Genus: Hibiscus
- Species: H. pusillus

Binomial name
- Hibiscus pusillus Thunb.

Synonyms
- Hibiscus atromarginatus Eckl. & Zeyh.; Hibiscus gossypinus Eckl. & Zeyh.; Hibiscus lasiospermus E.Mey. ex Harv.; Hibiscus macrocalyx Garcke; Hibiscus serratus E.Mey. ex Harv.

= Hibiscus pusillus =

Species of plant

Hibiscus pusillus is a species of flowering plant in the family Malvaceae, native to seasonally dry areas of southern Africa. There is some confusion with Hibiscus trionum, with which it shares the common names bladderweed and Terblansbossie (Afrikaans), perhaps due to the name Hibiscus pusillus Eckl. & Zeyh. being a synonym of Hibiscus trionum L., sometimes called the bladder hibiscus.
