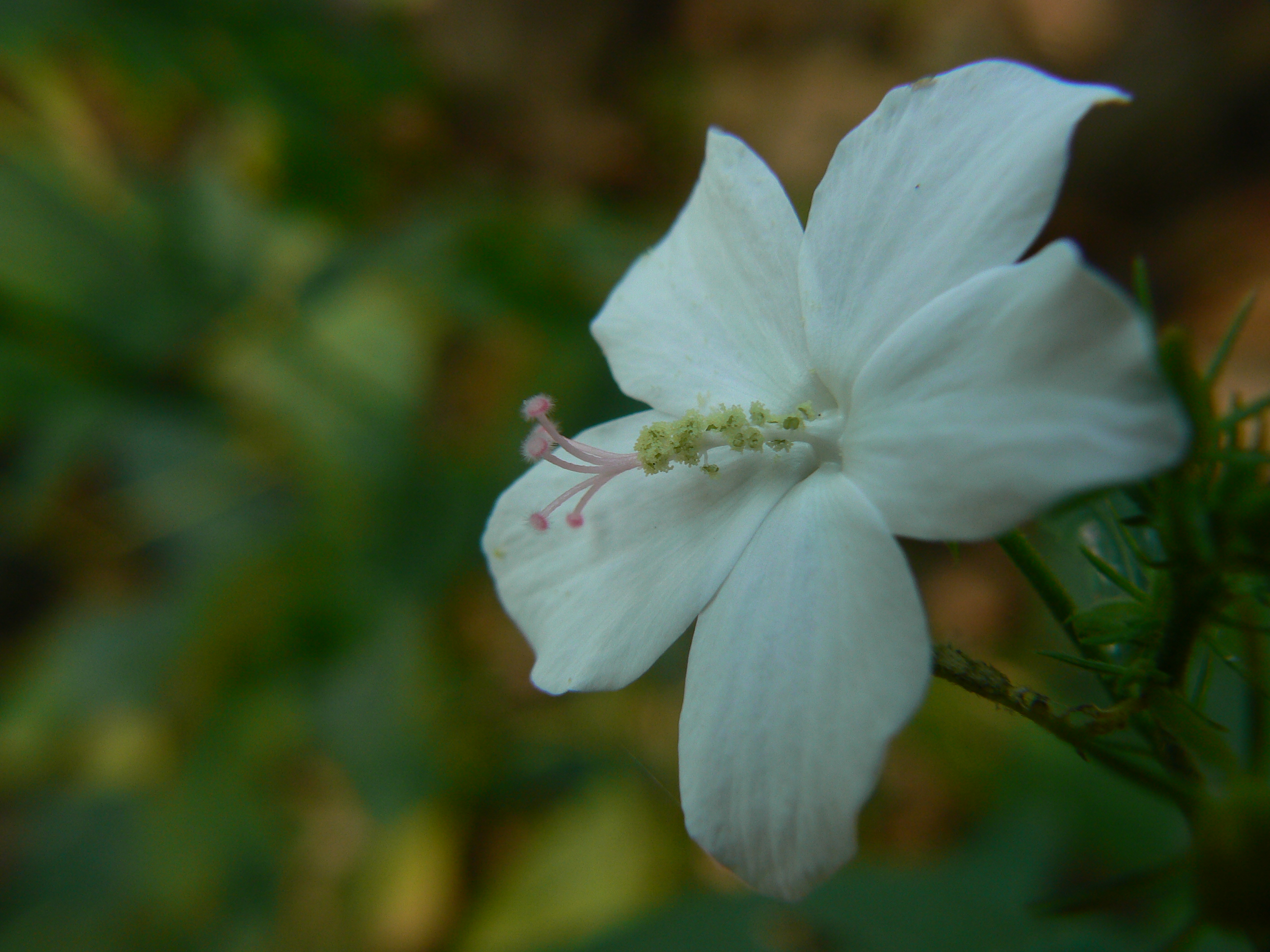

Scientific classification
- Kingdom: Plantae
- Clade: Tracheophytes
- Clade: Angiosperms
- Clade: Eudicots
- Clade: Rosids
- Order: Malvales
- Family: Malvaceae
- Genus: Hibiscus
- Species: H. hirtus

Binomial name
- Hibiscus hirtus L.

Synonyms
- Hibiscus Phoeniceus; Hibiscus Rosa Malabarica; Lesser Mallow; Wild Lesser Mallow

= Hibiscus hirtus =

Species of flowering plant

Hibiscus hirtus, commonly known as the lesser mallow, is a species of Hibiscus found in India. It is a perennial deciduous shrub with a maximum height of about 1 meter.
