= Hibiscus acapulcensis =

Scientific classification
- Kingdom: Plantae
- Clade: Tracheophytes
- Clade: Angiosperms
- Clade: Eudicots
- Clade: Rosids
- Order: Malvales
- Family: Malvaceae
- Genus: Hibiscus
- Species: H. acapulcensis

Binomial name
- Hibiscus acapulcensis Fryxell)

Species of flowering plant

Hibiscus acapulcensis is a species within the genus Hibiscus (family Malvaceae), native to the coastal regions of southwestern Mexico, primarily concentrated around Acapulco in Guerrero.

== Description ==
H. acapulcensis is a relatively small to medium-sized shrub, typically attaining a height of 1.5 to 3 m (4 ft 11 in to 9 ft 10 in). The plant is characterized by its large, showy, trumpet-shaped flowers, which range from deep pink to red or white, depending on the specific cultivar or environmental factors.

The foliar morphology of H. acapulcensis consists of broad, ovate leaves arranged in a spiral pattern along a stalk, which contribute to its aesthetic appeal and overall physiological function.

== Distribution and habitat ==
The plant demonstrates a preference for well-drained soils and is adapted to thrive in tropical and subtropical climates, with an optimal requirement for full sunlight exposure. In its native habitat (the hibiscus genus is originally native to tropical Asia), it is commonly found in lowland areas and along the fringes of tropical forests, where it likely benefits from the warmth, light, and occasional disturbances characteristic of such environments.

From an ecological perspective, H. acapulcensis exhibits notable resilience to coastal conditions, including moderate salt tolerance, which contributes to its suitability for cultivation in coastal gardens or areas subject to saline influences. Its ornamental value is enhanced by both its vibrant floral display and its relative hardiness in a range of environmental conditions.

== Uses ==
In terms of ethnobotany, H. acapulcensis is utilized in traditional medicine, particularly for the preparation of infusions or teas derived from its flowers, although detailed pharmacological investigations of this species remain limited. Despite its regional prevalence, the species is not as widely cultivated as other members of the genus Hibiscus and is relatively uncommon outside its native range.

Overall, H. acapulcensis represents an important component of the Acapulco region's flora, notable for its ornamental characteristics, environmental adaptability, and potential medicinal uses. However, further studies would be necessary to explore its full ecological role and therapeutic properties.
