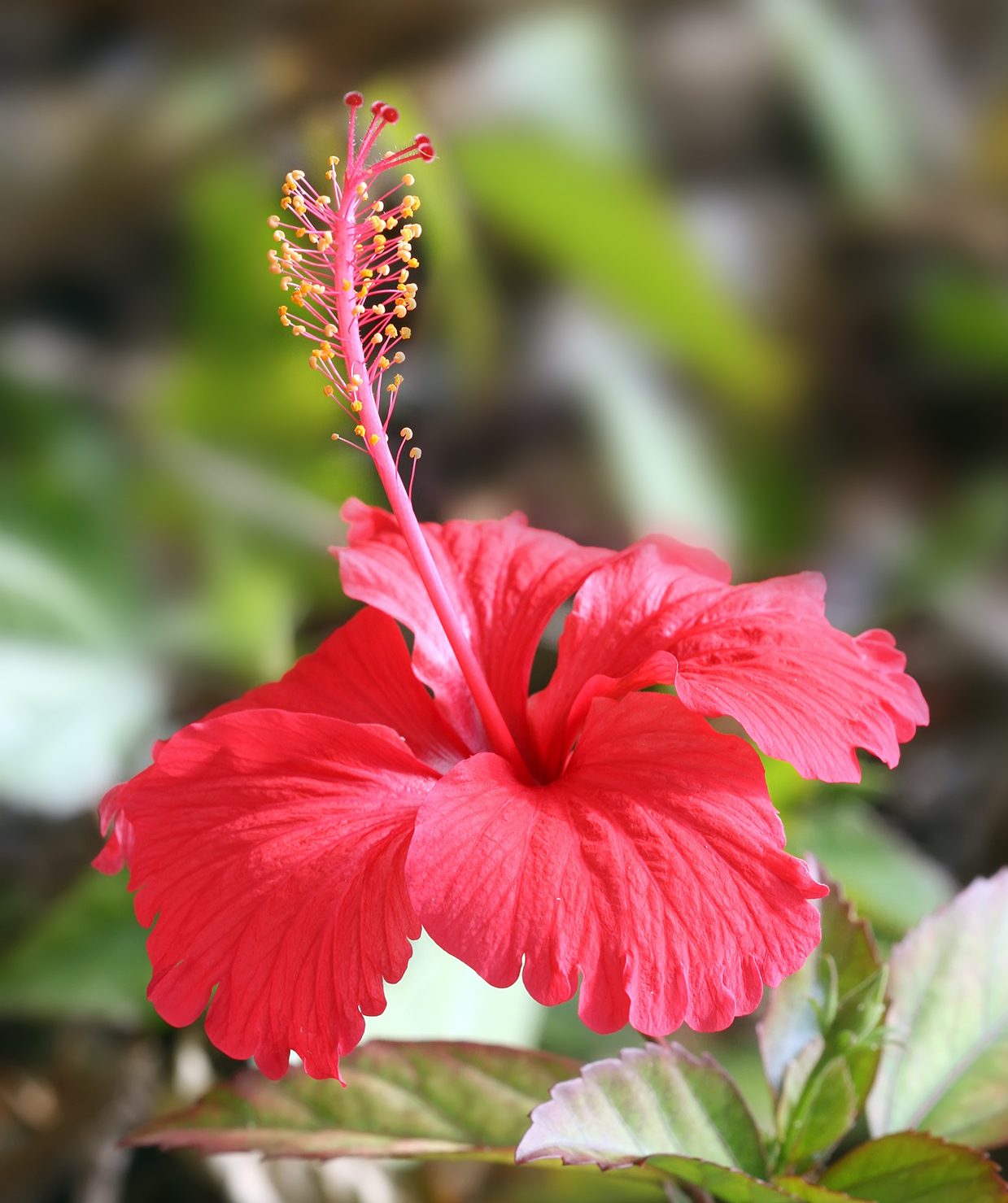
- Hibiscus × archeri

Scientific classification
- Kingdom: Plantae
- Clade: Tracheophytes
- Clade: Angiosperms
- Clade: Eudicots
- Clade: Rosids
- Order: Malvales
- Family: Malvaceae
- Subfamily: Malvoideae
- Tribe: Hibisceae
- Genus: Hibiscus; L.

Type species
- Hibiscus syriacus L.

Species
- See list of Hibiscus species

Synonyms
- Bombix Medik.; Bombycella Lindl.; Bombyx Moench; Brockmania W.Fitzg.; Canhamo Perini; Cotyloplecta Alef.; Erebennus Alef.; Fioria Mattei; Furcaria Kostel.; Gourmania A.Chev.; Humbertianthus Hochr.; Ketmia Mill.; Laguna Cav.; Macrostelia Hochr.; Marconia Mattei; Muenchhusia Heist. ex Fabr.; Munchusia Heist. ex Raf.; Petitia Neck., opus utique oppr.; Solandra Murray, nom. illeg.; Symphyochlamys Gürke; Talipariti Fryxell; Triguera Cav., nom. rej.; Trionaea Medik.; Trionum L.; Triplochiton Alef., nom. rej.; Wilhelminia Hochr.

= Hibiscus =

Genus of plants

Hibiscus is a genus of plants in the family Malvaceae native to the tropics and subtropics. The genus is quite large, comprising 319 species. Hibiscus are renowned for their large, showy flowers and those species are commonly known simply as "hibiscus", or less widely known as rose mallow. The genus includes both annual and perennial herbaceous plants, as well as woody shrubs and small trees.

Several species are widely cultivated as ornamental plants, notably Hibiscus syriacus and Hibiscus × rosa-sinensis.

== Description ==
Hibiscus tiliaceus in flower

Dehisced capsule fruit of Hibiscus praeteritus releasing hairy seeds

=== Vegetative characteristics ===
Hibiscus are annual or perennial, 0.1–4 m tall shrubs, subshrubs, trees, or herbs with alternate, usually stipulate, petiolate leaves with an entire or lobed margin. The leaf venation is pinnate or palmate.

=== Generative characteristics ===
The flowers are large and conspicuous. They are trumpet-shaped, with five or more petals, colour from white to pink, red, blue, orange, peach, and from 4–18 cm broad. Flower colour in certain species, such as H. mutabilis and H. tiliaceus, changes with age. The fruit is a dry five-lobed capsule, containing several seeds in each lobe, which are released when the capsule dehisces (splits open) at maturity. It is of red and white colours. It is an example of complete flowering.

=== Traits ===
Known for its hardiness, Hibiscus rosa-sinensis withstands ailments and pests, and is tough in the face of both too much water and/or drought.

== Taxonomy ==
It was described by Carl Linnaeus in 1753 with Hibiscus syriacus L. as the type species.

=== Etymology ===
The generic name is derived from the Greek name ἱβίσκος (hibískos) which Greek botanist Pedanius Dioscorides gave to a plant now scientifically labelled as Althaea officinalis.

=== Distribution ===
Hibiscus species are numerous, and are native to a wide variety of tropical and warm temperate regions, from China to East Africa to Hawaii. In Hawaii, there is a question as to whether it was brought to the island by Polynesian settlers or is indigenous. There are 35 species which are native to the US. Scarlet rosemallow, a Hibiscus species native to Florida, thrives in wetlands, as does the less common swamp rosemallow. Rose of Sharon is not a rose, but rather a hibiscus shrub, native to both Northern Israel and Syria.

There is a great deal of hybridization via grafting of differing Hibiscus species, resulting in cultivars possessing various colors and appearance. Hot houses and indoor spaces enable the flower to thrive outside of tropical and sub-tropical areas. Often these hybrids look very different from. native species of hibiscus.

=== Botanical Gardens ===
Hibiscus is a popular plant worldwide in many botanical gardens. The planting and presenting hibiscus dates back to the 1700s at Boboli Gardens, Florence, Italy, and continues to this day.

In Fiji, a project was started to save the country's rare Hibiscus storckii from extinction, via cultivating it in the country's Savurua Botanic Garden on Viti Levu.

Many botanic gardens in the USA showcase hibiscus. The Chicago Botanic Garden contains a wide assortment of hibiscus cultivars in colors ranging from red to peach to purple. The Brooklyn Botanic Garden appreciates the heartiness and longevity of the flower, as well as its multicolored options, and along with other flowers, highlights hibiscus by its water garden. There are six endemic hibiscus species in Hawaii, which come in a variety of colors. The Limahuli Botanical Garden (Pacific Tropical Botanical Garden) is rich in a variety of species, including hibiscus. A small sampling of other American gardens which display hibiscus includes the UT Gardens (Tennessee,) the Frelinghuysen Arboretum in New Jersey, and Atlanta Botanical Garden.

Hibiscus is also well presented across Europe. Some examples of locations include Kew Gardens in London, where the rare Clay's Hibiscus is housed, preserved, and propagated. This hibiscus species is severely endangered in its native Hawaii, due to climate change, crowding out by non-native plants, and consumption by wild goats and pigs. Another site is Jardin Extraordinaire in Nantes, France, whose microclimate (several degrees warmer than the general area) allows for the growth of many tropical plants, including hibiscus. Le Gallerie Deglie Uffizi in Italy contains Hibiscus rosa-synensis. Exotic plants have been propagated in these gardens since the 1700s, and an awareness of Hibiscus existed as far back as the Medieval period, since it is mentioned by Dante in "Inferno." In Italy, Hibiscus is commonly planted for its ornamental value.

The Jerusalem Botanical Gardens, which has the most intensive compilation of plants not only in Israel, but in the entire Middle East, highlights a variety of hibiscus species, including Hibiscus schizopetalus, Hibiscus panduriformis, and Hibiscus coccineus.

=== Species ===
Several hundred species (433 in 2026) are accepted, including:

- Hibiscus acapulcensis Fryxell
- Hibiscus acetosella Welw. ex Hiern. – false roselle
- Hibiscus aculeatus Walter — comfortroot
- Hibiscus aethiopicus L.
- Hibiscus aponeurus Sprague & Hutch.
- Hibiscus × archeri W.Watson — red hibiscus
- Hibiscus arnottianus A.Gray — koki'o Ke'oke'o (Hawaii)
- Hibiscus bifurcatus Cav. — fork-bracted rosemallow
- Hibiscus biseptus S.Watson — Arizona rosemallow
- Hibiscus boryanus DC. — foulsapate marron (Mauritius and Réunion)
- Hibiscus brackenridgei A.Gray — Hawaiian hibiscus ma'o hau hele
- Hibiscus calyphyllus Cav. — lemonyellow rosemallow (tropical Africa)
- Hibiscus cameronii Knowles & Westc. — Cameron's hibiscus, pink hibiscus
- Hibiscus cannabinus L. — Kenaf
- Hibiscus clayi O.Deg. & I.Deg.— Hawaiian red hibiscus (Hawaii)
- Hibiscus coccineus (Medik.) Walter — scarlet rosemallow
- Hibiscus columnaris Cav. — mahot rempart
- Hibiscus cooperi J.Veitch f. — one of the parent species of Hibiscus × rosa-sinensis (Erromango Island, Vanuatu)
- Hibiscus coulteri Harv. ex A.Gray — desert rosemallow
- Hibiscus dasycalyx S.F.Blake & Shiller — Neches River rosemallow
- Hibiscus denudatus Benth. — pale face (Southwestern US, Northwestern Mexico)
- Hibiscus dioscorides A.G.Mill. (Yemen)
- Hibiscus diriffan A.G.Mill. (Yemen)
- Hibiscus diversifolius Jacq. — swamp hibiscus
- Hibiscus elatus Sw. – mahoe
- Hibiscus engleri K.Schum. – wild hibiscus
- Hibiscus erlangeri (Gürke) Thulin (Ethiopia and Somalia)
- Hibiscus escobariae Fryxell
- Hibiscus fragilis DC.—mandrinette (Mascarene Islands)
- Hibiscus furcellatus Desr. — lindenleaf rosemallow (Caribbean, Florida, Central America, South America, Hawaii)
- Hibiscus genevei Bojer (Mauritius)
- Hibiscus grandiflorus Michx. — swamp rosemallow (Southeastern US)
- Hibiscus hamabo Siebold & Zucc.
- Hibiscus heterophyllus Vent. — native rosella
- Hibiscus hirtus L. — lesser mallow
- Hibiscus hispidissimus Griff.
- Hibiscus insularis Endl. — Phillip Island hibiscus (Phillip Island)
- Hibiscus kaute L.A.J. Thompson & Butaud — one of the parent species of Hibiscus × rosa-sinensis (French Polynesia)
- Hibiscus kokio Hillebr. ex Wawra — red rosemallow
- Hibiscus laevis All. (=H. militaris) — halberd-leaved rosemallow (central and eastern North America)
- Hibiscus leptocladus Benth. (Northwest Australia)
- Hibiscus liliiflorus Cav. — Rodrigues tree hibiscus
- Hibiscus lunariifolius Willd.
- Hibiscus macilwraithensis (Fryxell) Craven & B.E.Pfeil (Australia)
- Hibiscus macrophyllus Roxb. ex Hornem. — largeleaf rosemallow
- Hibiscus macropodus Wagner & Vierh.
- Hibiscus makinoi Jôtani & H.Ohba — Okinawan hibiscus
- Hibiscus malacophyllus Balf.f. (Yemen)
- Hibiscus martianus Zucc. — heartleaf rosemallow
- Hibiscus mesnyi Pierre ex Laness. (Vietnam endemic)
- Hibiscus moscheutos L. — crimsoneyed rosemallow (Central and Eastern North America)
  - Hibiscus moscheutos subsp. lasiocarpos (Cav.) O.J.Blanch. (synonym H. lasiocarpos Cav.) — woolly rosemallow
- Hibiscus mutabilis L. — cotton rosemallow, Confederate rose (East Asia)
- Hibiscus paramutabilis L.H.Bailey
- Hibiscus phoeniceus Jacq. — Brazilian rosemallow
- Hibiscus platanifolius (Willd.) Sweet
- Hibiscus poeppigii (Spreng.) Garcke — Poeppig's rosemallow
- Hibiscus pusillus Thunb. – bladderweed
- Hibiscus quattenensis A.G.Mill. & Thulin
- Hibiscus radiatus — monarch rosemallow
- Hibiscus × rosa-sinensis L. — Chinese hibiscus, a pre-colonial Polynesian hybrid of Hibiscus kaute (French Polynesia) and Hibiscus cooperi (Vanuatu)
- Hibiscus schizopetalus (Mast.) Hook.f. — fringed rosemallow
- Hibiscus scottii Balf.f.
- Hibiscus sinosyriacus L.H.Bailey
- Hibiscus socotranus G.Ll.Lucas
- Hibiscus splendens C.Fraser ex Graham
- Hibiscus stenanthus Balf.f. (Yemen)
- Hibiscus striatus Cav. — striped rosemallow
- Hibiscus sturtii Hook. (Australia)
- Hibiscus syriacus L. (type species) — rose of Sharon (Asia)
- Hibiscus taiwanensis S.Y.Hu
- Hibiscus tiliaceus L. — sea hibiscus (Australia, Southeast Asia, Oceania)
- Hibiscus tozerensis (Australia)
- Hibiscus trilobus Aubl. — threelobe rosemallow
- Hibiscus trionum L. — flower-of-an-hour
- Hibiscus vitifolius L. — tropical rose mallow
- Hibiscus waimeae A.Heller — koki'o ke'oke'o (Hawaii)
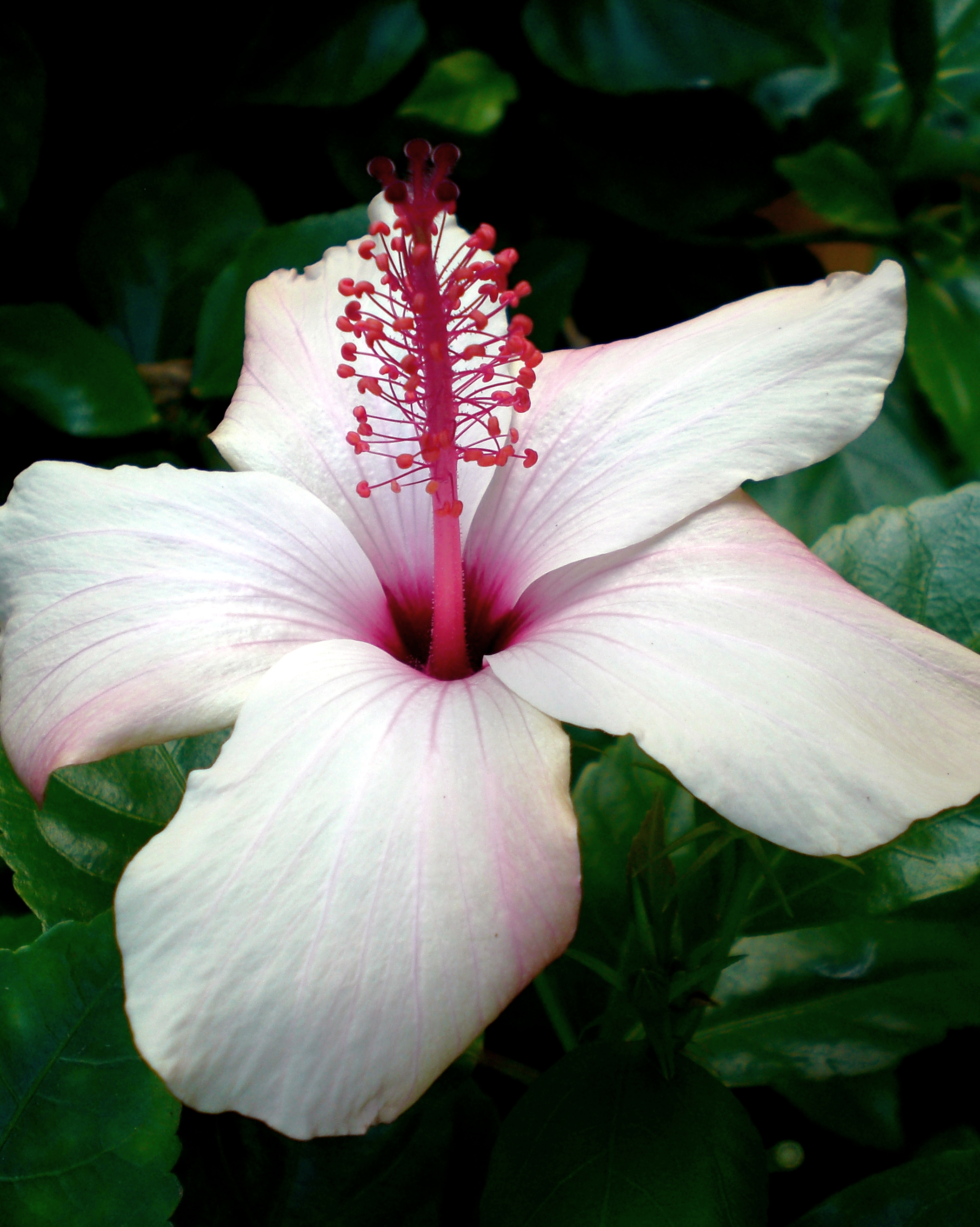
A white Hibiscus arnottianus in Hawaii

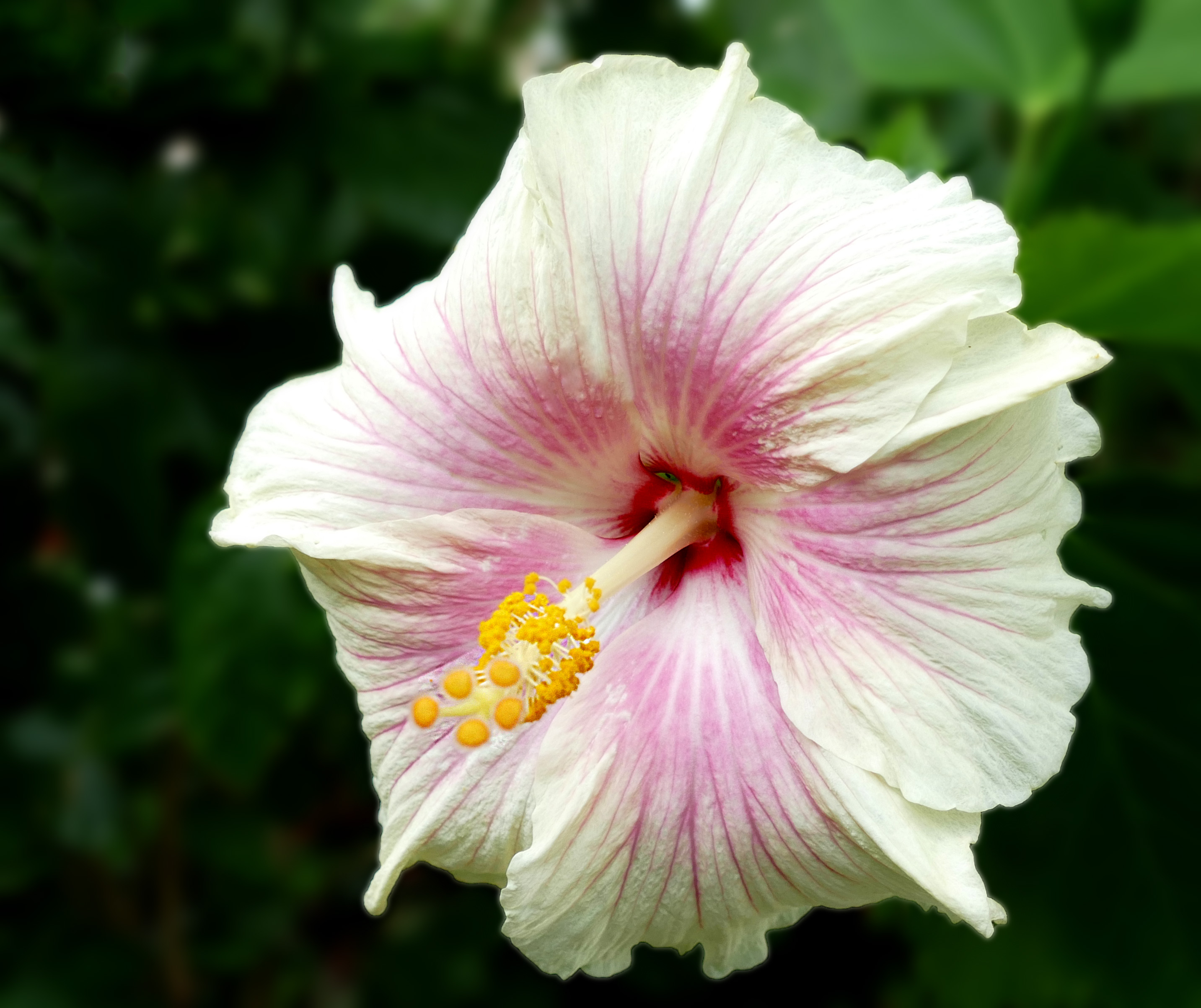
(Giant) tropical Hibiscus × rosa-sinensis 'Madonna'

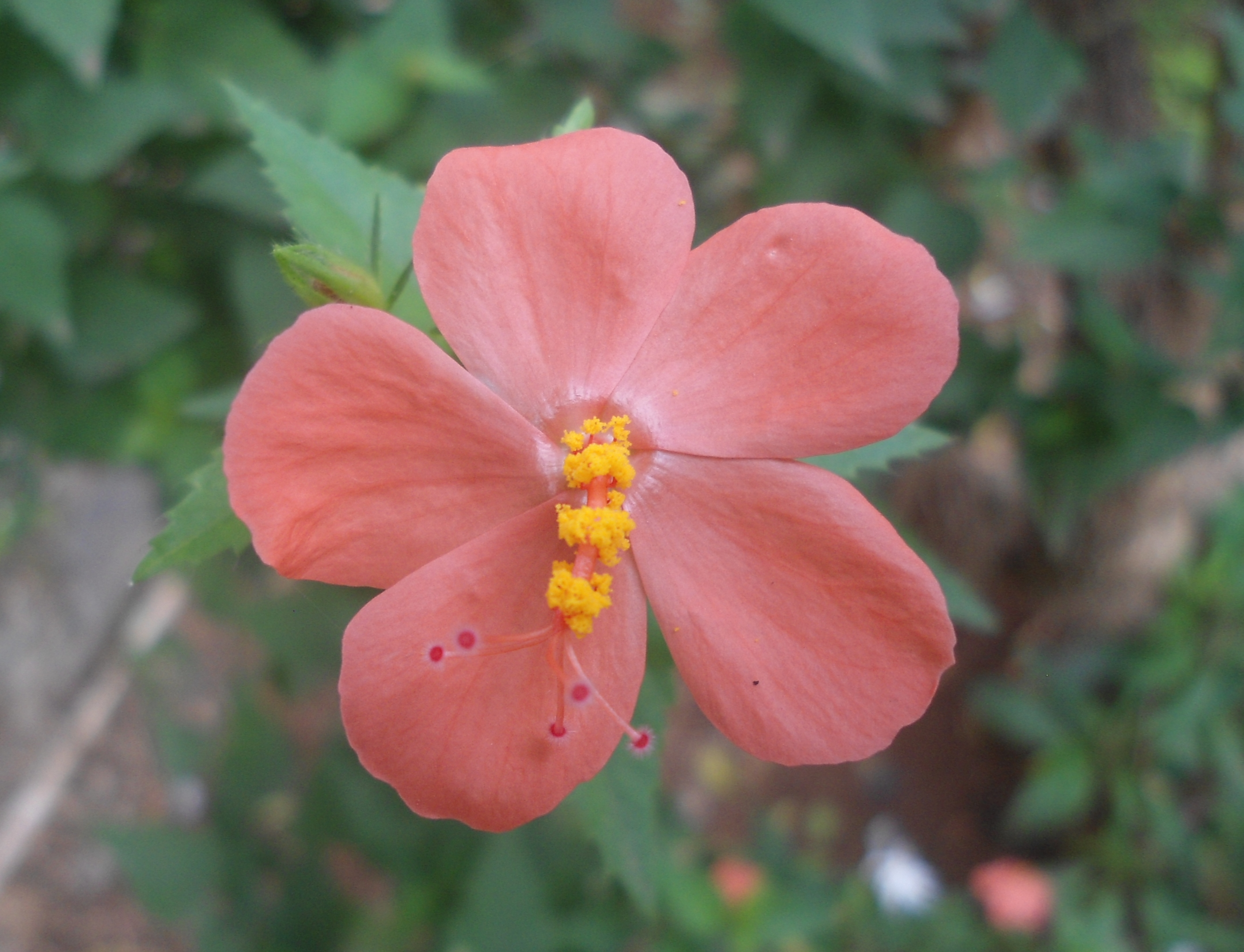
Hibiscus hirtus

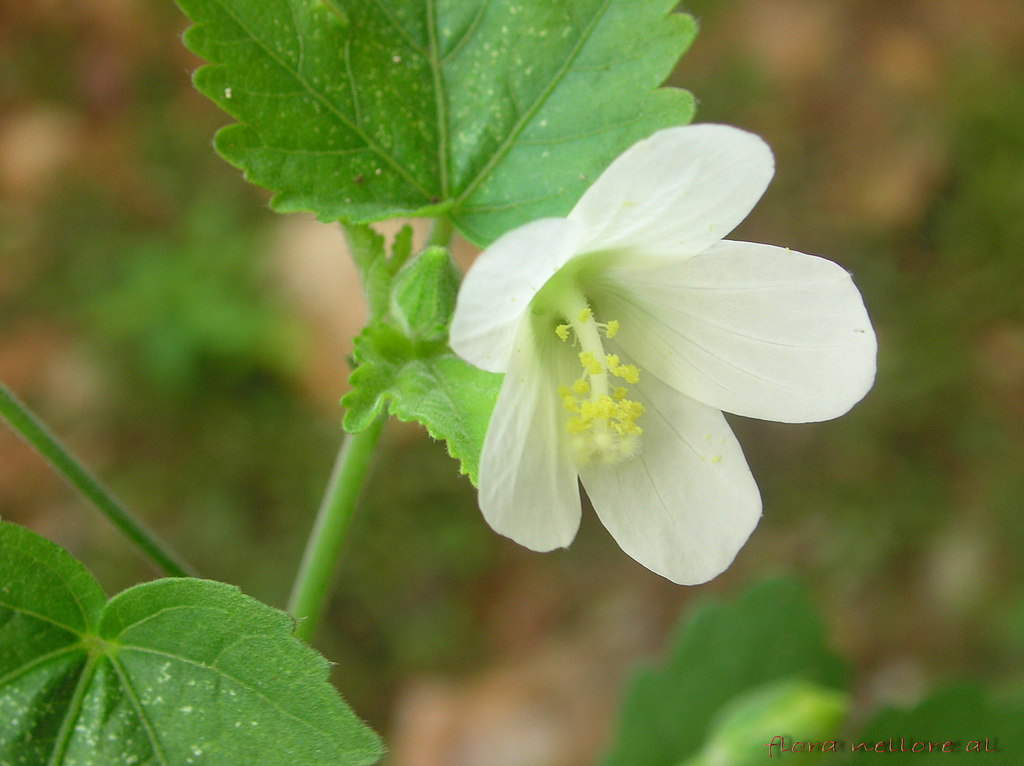
Hibiscus lobatus

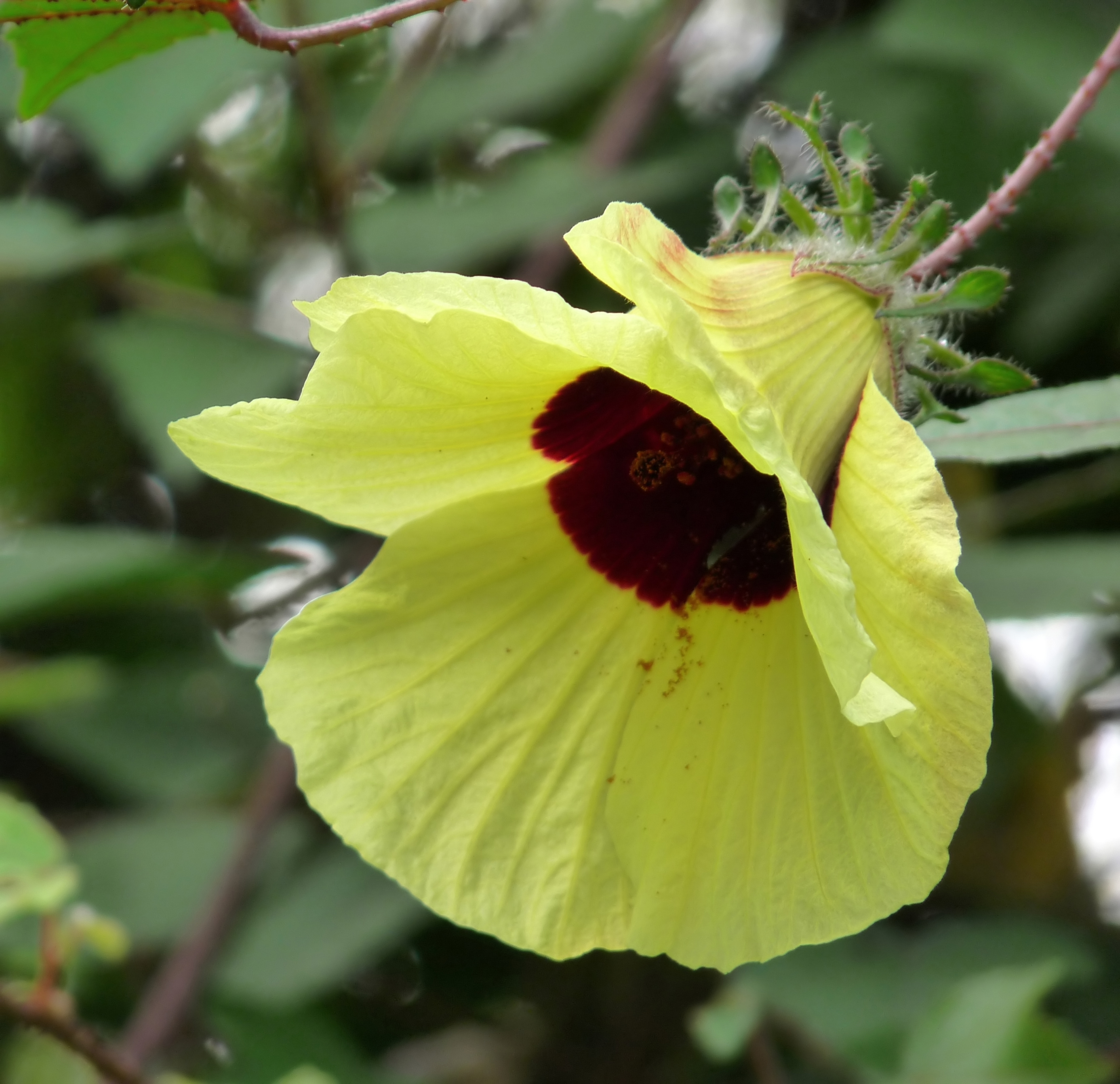
Hibiscus hispidissimus

=== Formerly placed in the genus ===
- Abelmoschus esculentus (L.) Moench (as H. esculentus L.)
- Abelmoschus ficulneus (L.) Wight & Arn. (as H. ficulneus L.)
- Abelmoschus manihot subsp. manihot (as H. manihot L.)
- Abelmoschus manihot var. pungens (Roxb.) Hochr. (as H. pungens Roxb.)
- Abelmoschus manihot var. tetraphyllus (Roxb. ex Hornem.) Borss. Waalk. (as H. tetraphyllus Roxb. ex Hornem.)
- Abelmoschus moschatus subsp. moschatus (as H. abelmoschus L.)
- Abelmoschus moschatus subsp. tuberosus (Span.) Borss. Waalk. (as H. sagittifolius Kurz)
- Alyogyne cuneiformis (DC.) Lewton (as H. cuneiformis DC.)
- Alyogyne hakeifolia (Giord.) Alef. (as H. hakeifolius Giord.)
- Alyogyne huegelii (Endl.) Fryxell (as H. wrayae Lindl.)
- Alyogyne pinoniana (Gaudich.) Fryxell (as H. pinonianus Gaudich.)
- Astrohibiscus caesius (Garcke) McLay & R.L.Barrett (as H. caesius Garcke) — dark-eyed hibiscus (southwestern Tanzania to South Africa)
- Blanchardia clypeata (L.) M.M.Hanes & R.L.Barrett (as H. clypeatus L.) — Congo mahoe
- Bombycidendron campylosiphon (Turcz.) Warb. (as Hibiscus campylosiphon Turcz.)
- Cravenia panduriformis (Burm.f.) McLay & R.L.Barrett (as H. panduriformis Burm.f.)
- Firmiana simplex (L.) W.Wight (as H. simplex L.)
- Lagunaria patersonia subsp. patersonia (as H. patersonius Andrews)
- Kosteletzkya adoensis (Hochst. ex A. Rich.) Mast. (as H. adoensis Hochst. ex A.Rich.)
- Kosteletzkya pentacarpos (L.) Ledeb. (as H. pentacarpos L.)
- Kosteletzkya tubiflora (DC.) Blanch. & McVaugh (as H. tubiflorus DC.)
- Kosteletzkya virginica (L.) C.Presl ex A.Gray (as H. virginicus L.)
- Pavonia arabica Hochst. & Steud. ex Boiss. (as H. flavus Forssk.)
- Pavonia spinifex (L.) Cav. (as H. spinifex L.)
- Radyera farragei (F.Muell.) Fryxell & S.H.Hashmi (as H. farragei F.Muell.)
- Sabdariffa gossypiifolia (Mill.) M.M.Hanes & R.L.Barrett (as H. sabdariffa L.) — roselle, omutete, or sorrel
- Thespesia lampas (Cav.) Dalzell (as H. lampas Cav.)
- Thespesia populnea (L.) Sol. ex Corrêa (as H. populneoides Roxb. or H. populneus L.)

== Uses ==
=== Landscaping ===
Hibiscus species are grown for their showy flowers or used as landscape shrubs, and are used to attract butterflies, bees, and hummingbirds. In the Philippines, it is considered to be the Queen of the Garden. Hibiscus is used as an ornamental flower in tropical and sub-tropical zones worldwide.

=== Rope and construction ===
The ropes on the missionary ship Messenger of Peace were made of fibres from hibiscus trees.

=== Food ===
Dried hibiscus is edible, and it is often a delicacy in Mexico. It can also be candied and used as a garnish, usually for desserts. Contrary to popular assumptions that the flowers or petals are what is being eaten, it is the calyces. Hibiscus sabdariffa, also known as "Jamaica" or roselle, is the species of hibiscus used to make herbal tea. Since it is sour, it is often mixed with honey, sugar, or cinnamon. In Tobago, it was used as fodder for animals.

=== Folk medicine ===
Hibiscus × rosa-sinensis is described as having a number of medical uses in Indian Ayurveda. In Tobago, it was used for hygienic purposes (dental.) Hibiscus has many health benefits, such as lowering blood pressure and providing antioxidants. In ancient Hawaii, chewing and swallowing the leaves was considered a natural laxative. Chewing its seeds was seen as a way of strengthening a feeble child. Extracts were used to prevent falling hair and dandruff, and other plant parts were considered valuable in fighting infections.

=== Precautions and contraindications ===
==== Pregnancy and lactation ====
While the mechanism is not well understood, previous animal studies have demonstrated anti-fertility effects of H. × rosa-sinensis. The H. × rosa-sinensis extract has exhibited contraceptive effects in the form of estrogen activity in rats. These findings have not been observed in humans. The H. × rosa-sinensis is also thought to have emmenagogue effects which can stimulate menstruation and, in some women, cause an abortion. Due to the documented adverse effects in animal studies and the reported pharmacological properties, the H. × rosa-sinensis are not recommended for use during pregnancy.

== Symbolism and culture ==
The red hibiscus is the flower of the Hindu goddess Kali, and appears frequently in depictions of her in the art of Bengal, India, often with the goddess and the flower merging in form. The hibiscus is used as an offering to Kali and the god Ganesha in Hindu worship.

The pink hibiscus flower has its origins in Asia and the Pacific Islands, where it has served as a symbol of beauty, femininity, and young love. It is commonly associated with the Hawaiian culture and the Aloha spirit, which celebrates love, happiness, and peace. In Hawaii, it is used for decoration, particularly behind one's ear. In ancient times, they were used to create lei, which were short-lived but gorgeous.

=== As a national and state symbol ===
The hibiscus is a national symbol of Haiti, and the national flower of nations including the Solomon Islands and Niue. Hibiscus syriacus is the national flower of South Korea, and Hibiscus × rosa-sinensis is the national flower of Malaysia. It is also the state flower of Hawaii.
