= Hibiscus sinosyriacus =

Scientific classification
- Kingdom: Plantae
- Clade: Tracheophytes
- Clade: Angiosperms
- Clade: Eudicots
- Clade: Rosids
- Order: Malvales
- Family: Malvaceae
- Genus: Hibiscus
- Species: H. sinosyriacus

Binomial name
- Hibiscus sinosyriacus L.H.Bailey

Species of plant in the mallow family

Hibiscus sinosyriacus, the Chinese rose of Sharon, is a species of flowering plant in the family Malvaceae, native to southern China. The Royal Horticultural Society considers it a good plant for chalky soils. A number of cultivars are available, including 'Lilac Queen' and 'Ruby Glow'.
