= Hibiscus boryanus =

Scientific classification
- Kingdom: Plantae
- Clade: Tracheophytes
- Clade: Angiosperms
- Clade: Eudicots
- Clade: Rosids
- Order: Malvales
- Family: Malvaceae
- Genus: Hibiscus
- Species: H. boryanus

Binomial name
- Hibiscus boryanus DC.

Species of flowering plant

Hibiscus boryanus is a species of flowering plant in the family Malvaceae. It is a shrub or tree endemic to Mauritius and Réunion. It has been introduced to the Dominican Republic and Leeward Islands.

The species was first described by Augustin Pyramus de Candolle in 1824. The homonym Hibiscus boryanus Hook. & Arn. is a synonym of Hibiscus arnottianus subsp. arnottianus.
