= Hibiscus erlangeri =

Conservation status
- Near Threatened (IUCN 2.3)

Scientific classification
- Kingdom: Plantae
- Clade: Tracheophytes
- Clade: Angiosperms
- Clade: Eudicots
- Clade: Rosids
- Order: Malvales
- Family: Malvaceae
- Tribe: Hibisceae
- Genus: Hibiscus
- Species: H. erlangeri

Binomial name
- Hibiscus erlangeri (Gürke) Thulin (1998)

Synonyms
- Hibiscus benadirensis Mattei (1916); Marconia benadirensis (Mattei) Mattei (1921); Symphyochlamys erlangeri Gürke (1903)

Genus of flowering plants

Hibiscus erlangeri is a species of plant in the family Malvaceae. It is a shrub native to Ethiopia and southern Somalia.

It was formerly classed as the sole species in genus Symphyochlamys, but is now accepted as a species of Hibiscus.
