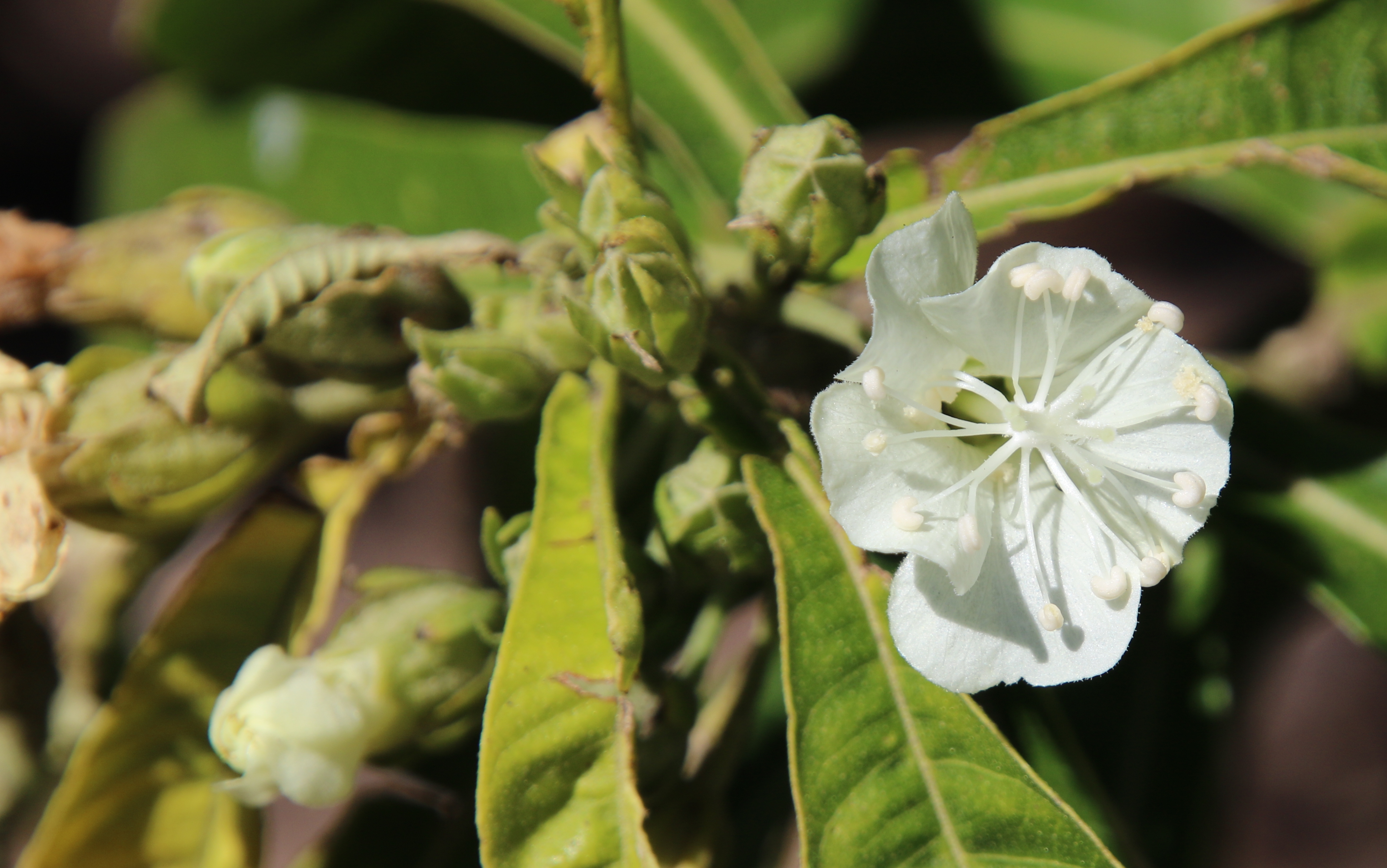
- Royal Botanic Gardens, Sydney

Scientific classification
- Kingdom: Plantae
- Clade: Tracheophytes
- Clade: Angiosperms
- Clade: Eudicots
- Clade: Rosids
- Order: Malvales
- Family: Malvaceae
- Genus: Hibiscus
- Species: H. macilwraithensis

Binomial name
- Hibiscus macilwraithensis (Fryxell) Craven & B.E.Pfeil

= Hibiscus macilwraithensis =

Macilwraithe hibiscus

Species of flowering plant

Hibiscus macilwraithensis, or the Macilwraithe hibiscus, is a shrub growing from one to four metres tall. It is endemic to the Cape York Peninsula of Australia.
