= Hibiscus dioscorides =

Conservation status
- Data Deficient (IUCN 3.1)

Scientific classification
- Kingdom: Plantae
- Clade: Tracheophytes
- Clade: Angiosperms
- Clade: Eudicots
- Clade: Rosids
- Order: Malvales
- Family: Malvaceae
- Genus: Hibiscus
- Species: H. dioscorides

Binomial name
- Hibiscus dioscorides A.G.Mill. (2004)

Species of flowering plant

Hibiscus dioscorides is a species of flowering plant in the family Malvaceae. It is a shrub endemic to the island of Socotra in Yemen. It grows on granite cliffs and among granite boulders in the eastern Hajhir Mountains at approximately 950 metres elevation. It is known only from the type specimen gathered on Jebal Jaaf.

The species can be distinguished from other woody Hibiscus on Socotra by its five-lobed cup-shaped calyx and filiform epicalyx lobes. It appears most similar to H. noli-tangere, and is differentiated by the indumentum of the calyx and epicalyx, linear rather than filiform epicalyx lobes, and by its broadly triangular calyx lobes.
