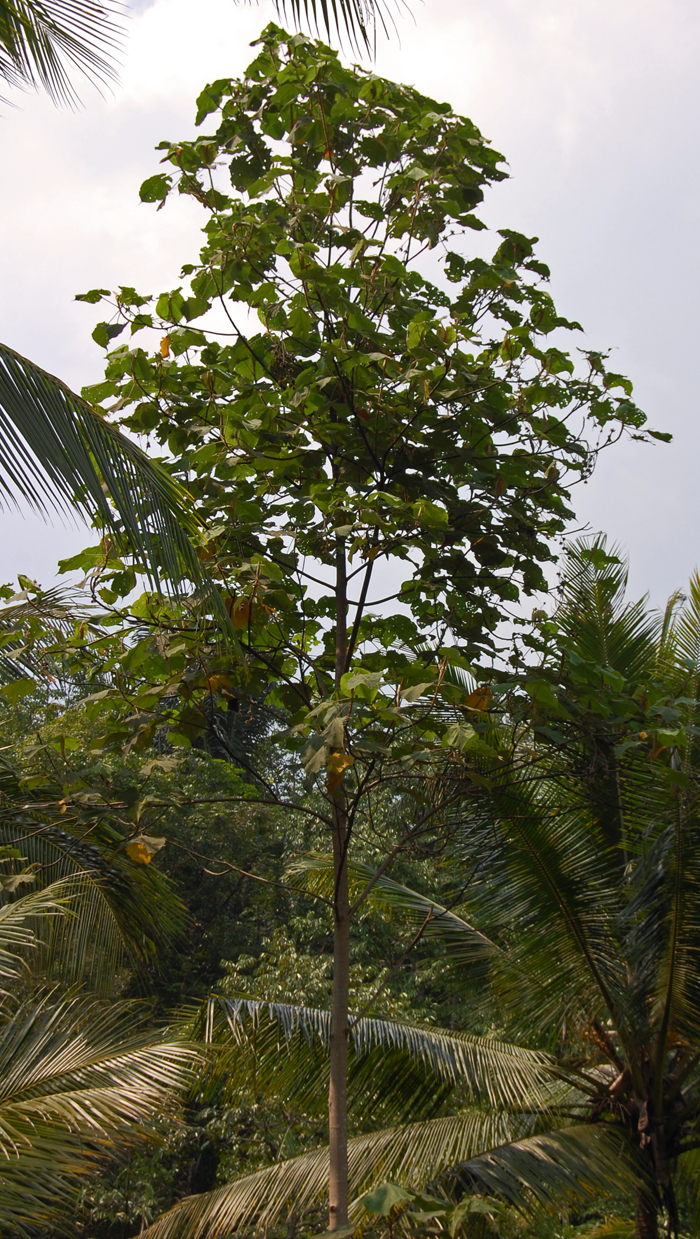

Scientific classification
- Kingdom: Plantae
- Clade: Tracheophytes
- Clade: Angiosperms
- Clade: Eudicots
- Clade: Rosids
- Order: Malvales
- Family: Malvaceae
- Subfamily: Malvoideae
- Tribe: Hibisceae
- Genus: Hibiscus
- Species: H. macrophyllus

Binomial name
- Hibiscus macrophyllus Roxb. ex Hornem.

Synonyms
- Hibiscus barbatus Noronha; Hibiscus setosus Roxb.; Hibiscus vestitus Griff.; Hibiscus vulpinus Reinw. ex Blume; Pariti macrophyllum (Roxb. ex Hornem.) G.Don; Talipariti macrophyllum (Roxb. ex Hornem.) Fryxell; Triplochiton spathacea Alef.

= Hibiscus macrophyllus =

Species of flowering plant

Hibiscus macrophyllus, the largeleaf rosemallow, is an Asian species of tropical forest tree in the subfamily Malvoideae, with large leaves and yellow flowers. Its native range is southern China, Indo-China and western Malesia (including the Philippines).

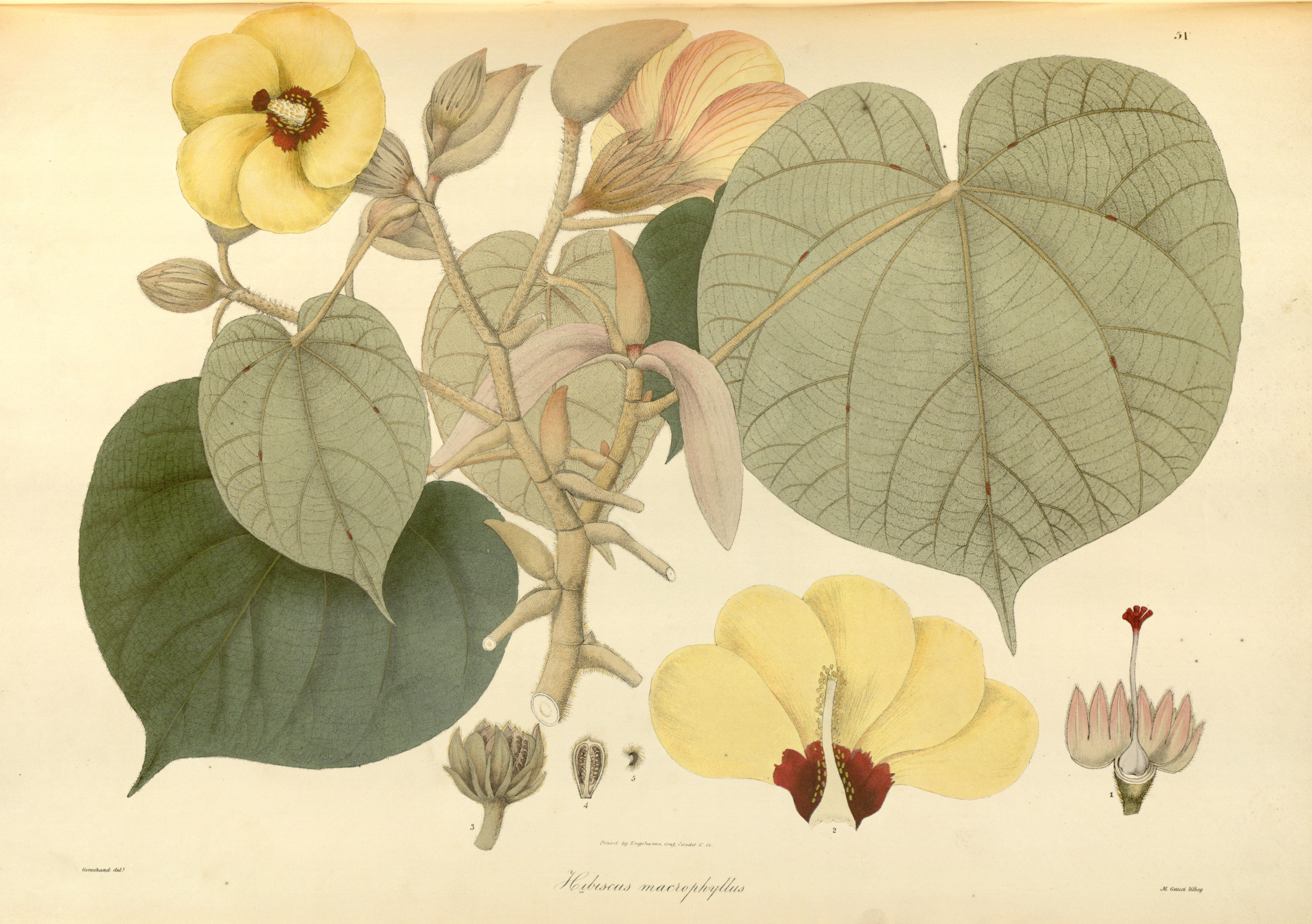

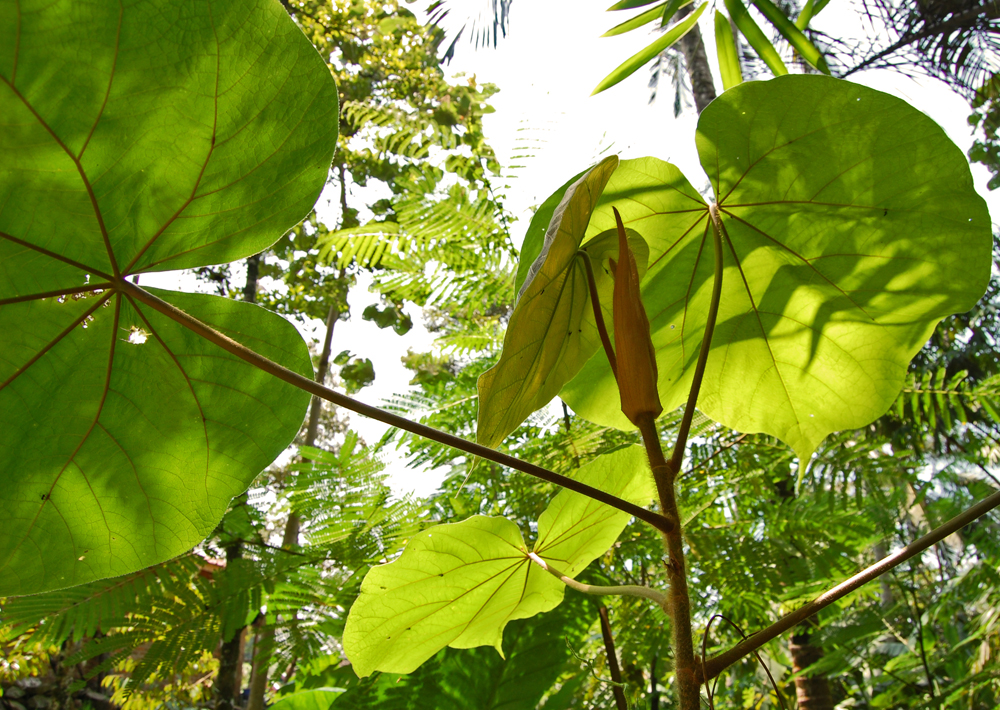

== Uses ==
H. macrophyllus can be grown as an ornamental plant and may be made into a green tea.
