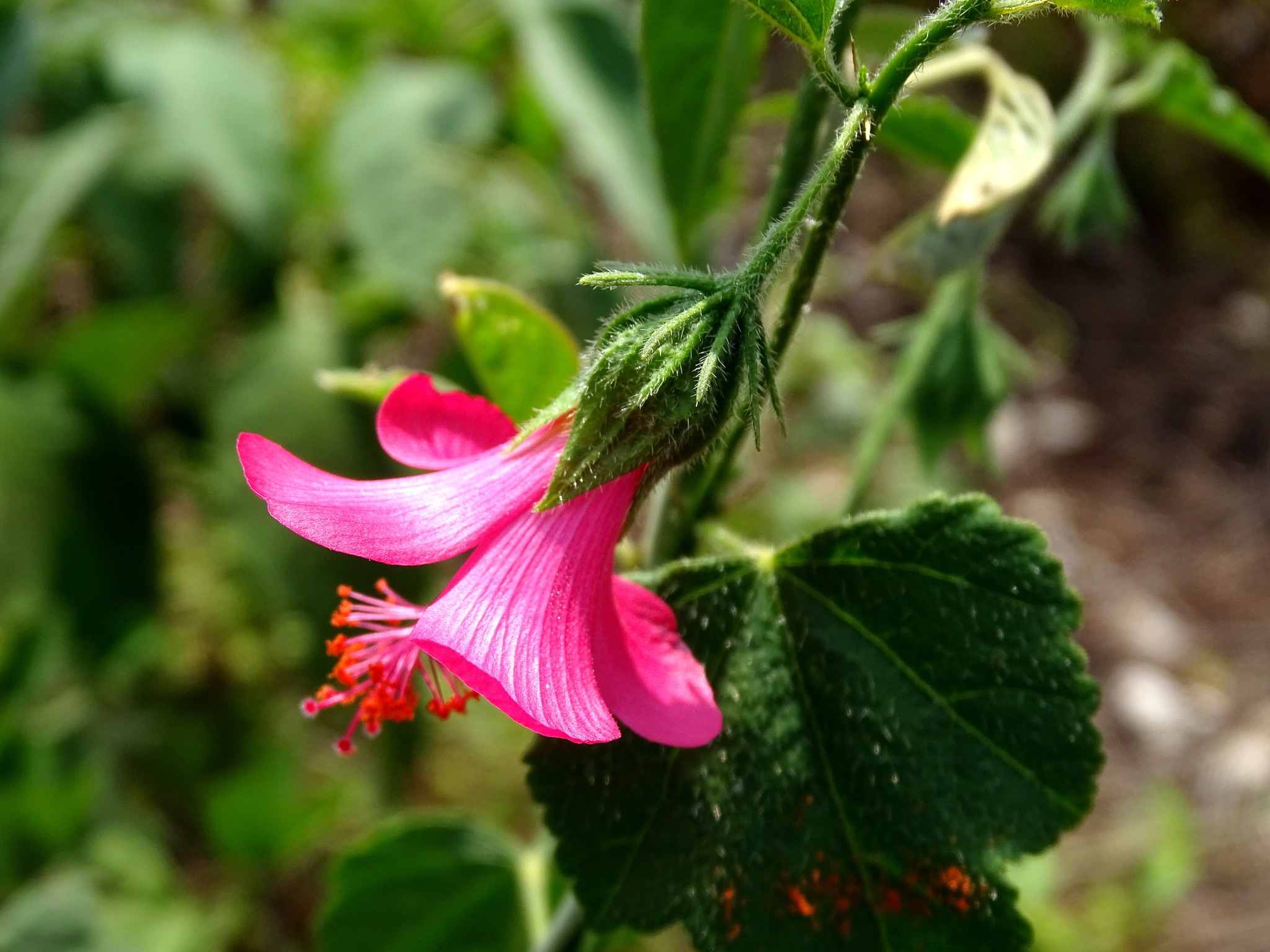

Conservation status
- Secure (NatureServe)

Scientific classification
- Kingdom: Plantae
- Clade: Tracheophytes
- Clade: Angiosperms
- Clade: Eudicots
- Clade: Rosids
- Order: Malvales
- Family: Malvaceae
- Genus: Hibiscus
- Species: H. poeppigii

Binomial name
- Hibiscus poeppigii (Spreng.) Garcke

Synonyms
- List: Achania floridana (Nutt.) Raf.; Achania poeppigii Spreng.; Hibiscus bancroftianus Macfad.; Hibiscus floridanus Shuttlew.; Hibiscus floridanus Shuttlew. ex A.Gray; Hibiscus macleayanus Bancr.; Hibiscus macleayanus Bancr. ex Macfad.; Hibiscus truncatus A.Rich.; Malache poeppigii (Spreng.) Kuntze; Malvaviscus floridanus Nutt.; Malvaviscus poeppigii (Spreng.) G.Don; Pavonia poeppigii (Spreng.) Schltdl.; Pavonia poeppigii (Spreng.) Steud.

= Hibiscus poeppigii =

Species of flowering plant

Hibiscus poeppigii, formerly Achania poeppigii, is a species of evergreen herbaceous perennial flowering plant in the genus Hibiscus commonly called the poeppig's rosemallow or fairy hibiscus.

== Etymology ==
Hibiscus poeppigii is named after Eduard Friedrich Poeppig, a German botanist who was active in the 19th century.

== Description ==
Hibiscus poeppigii is a subshrub, a partly woody plant, that can grow to as much as 1.8 meters (5.9 ft) in height. Its leaves are generally a broad egg shape generally with three lobes 1.2 to 4.5 centimeters long by 1.2 to 4.3 cm wide. The flowers hang downwards and are a narrow funnel shape breaking with separate petals that measures some 0.7 to 1.2 centimeters long and half as wide. The petals are generally red, but on occasion may be pink. The stamen column extends out of the flower and is bright red with dark orange pollen.

== Distribution ==
Hibiscus poeppigii is native to the Americas, found in Monroe and Miami-Dade counties in Florida (where NatureServe regards it as endangered), Mexico, the West Indies, and Guatemala.

It prefers morning sun, with some hot afternoon shade. Its blooms are only open for a day. Although resistant to the cold, below 40°F (4.4°C), it is no longer cold-tolerant. It needs full sun or partial shade.
