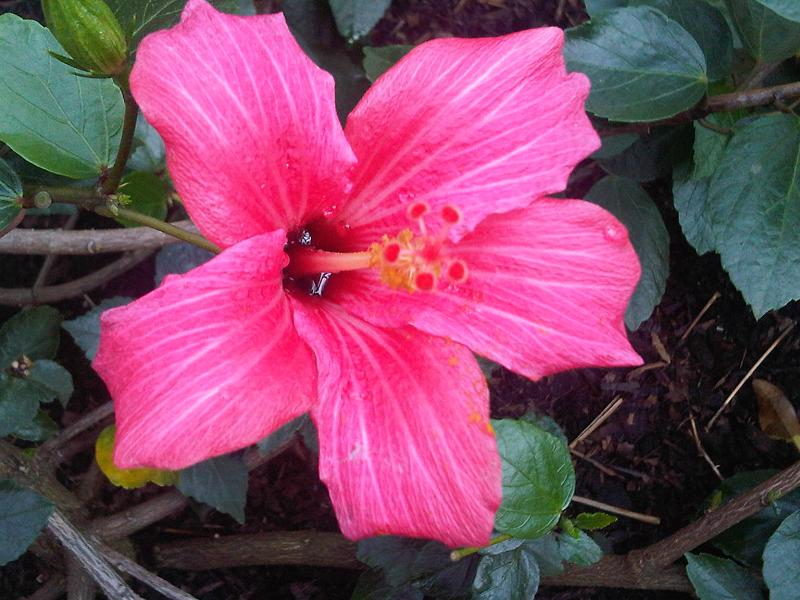

Conservation status
- Critically Endangered (IUCN 2.3)

Scientific classification
- Kingdom: Plantae
- Clade: Tracheophytes
- Clade: Angiosperms
- Clade: Eudicots
- Clade: Rosids
- Order: Malvales
- Family: Malvaceae
- Genus: Hibiscus
- Species: H. fragilis

Binomial name
- Hibiscus fragilis DC.

= Hibiscus fragilis =

Mandrinette

Species of flowering plant from Mauritius

Hibiscus fragilis, the mandrinette, is an extremely rare shrub that is endemic to steep slopes of the mountains Corps de Garde and Le Morne Brabant on Mauritius and from two further plants on Rodrigues. The mandrinette is an evergreen plant with flowers 7–10 cm diameter with five bright pink to carmine red petals.

The mandrinette looks rather similar to the Chinese hibiscus (Hibiscus rosa-sinensis) and the introduction of that to Mauritius as a garden plant is one of the main reasons for the dramatic decline of the mandrinette. Only 46 mature individuals exist in the wild but they are not able to reproduce due to competition from and hybridisation with this invasive Hibiscus species.

There are currently 200 plants in nurseries. Royal Botanic Gardens, Kew is attempting to reproduce seedlings of the species, with the help of Ex situ conservation, for reintroduction into the wild now that efforts to remove the invasive hibiscus have been successful.

In 1964, Andy Warhol produced his first "Flowers" series, depicting the mandrinette with petals in different colours based on a photograph by the nature photographer Patricia Caulfield, published in the June 1964 issue of the magazine Modern Photography.
