= List of Hibiscus species =

The following species in the flowering plant genus Hibiscus were accepted by Plants of the World Online as of March 2026. There have been multiple ancient polyploidization events in this genus.

== A ==
- Hibiscus acapulcensis Fryxell
- Hibiscus acetosella Welw. ex Hiern
- Hibiscus acicularis Standl.
- Hibiscus aculeatus Walter
- Hibiscus adscensionis Fryxell & Krapov.
- Hibiscus aethiopicus L.
- Hibiscus ahlensis Ulbr.
- Hibiscus allenii Sprague & Hutch.
- Hibiscus altissimus Hornby
- Hibiscus amambayensis Krapov. & Fryxell
- Hibiscus amazonicus Fryxell
- Hibiscus ambanitazensis M.H.Hanes & G.E.Schatz
- Hibiscus ambovombensis Hochr.
- Hibiscus analalavensis M.H.Hanes & G.E.Schatz
- Hibiscus andersonii Krapov. & Fryxell
- Hibiscus andongensis Hiern
- Hibiscus aneuthe Craven, F.D.Wilson & Fryxell
- Hibiscus angolensis Exell
- Hibiscus ankaramyensis Hochr.
- Hibiscus ankeranensis M.H.Hanes & G.E.Schatz
- Hibiscus antanossarum Baill.
- Hibiscus aphelus Craven, F.D.Wilson & Fryxell
- Hibiscus apodus Juswara & Craven
- Hibiscus aponeurus Sprague & Hutch.
- Hibiscus archboldianus Borss.Waalk.
- Hibiscus × archeri W.Watson
- Hibiscus arenicola A.S.Mitch.
- Hibiscus argutus Baker
- Hibiscus aridicola J.Anthony
- Hibiscus aridus R.A.Dyer
- Hibiscus arnhemensis F.D.Wilson
- Hibiscus arnottianus A.Gray
- Hibiscus articulatus Hochst. ex A.Rich.
- Hibiscus aruensis Borss.Waalk.
- Hibiscus asperifolioides Bân
- Hibiscus australensis Fosberg

== B ==
- Hibiscus bacalusius Craven, F.D.Wilson & Fryxell
- Hibiscus barbosae Exell
- Hibiscus benedicti Callm.
- Hibiscus benensis Fryxell & Krapov.
- Hibiscus benguellensis Exell & Mendonça
- Hibiscus bennettii L.A.J.Thomson & Braglia
- Hibiscus bequaertii De Wild.
- Hibiscus berberidifolius A.Rich.
- Hibiscus bernieri Baill.
- Hibiscus bicalyculatus Merr.
- Hibiscus bifurcatus Cav.
- Hibiscus biseptus S.Watson
- Hibiscus bojerianus Baill.
- Hibiscus boranensis Cufod.
- Hibiscus borealis Hochr.
- Hibiscus borneensis Airy Shaw
- Hibiscus boryanus DC.
- Hibiscus bowersiae (Fryxell) Craven
- Hibiscus brachychlaenus F.Muell.
- Hibiscus brachysiphonius F.Muell.
- Hibiscus brackenridgei A.Gray
- Hibiscus bragliae L.A.J.Thomson
- Hibiscus brennanii Craven & Fryxell
- Hibiscus bricchettii Gürke ex Ulbr.
- Hibiscus burtonii F.M.Bailey
- Hibiscus burtt-davyi Dunkley
- Hibiscus byrnesii F.D.Wilson

== C ==
- Hibiscus cabralensis Krapov.
- Hibiscus caerulescens Baill.
- Hibiscus calcareus McLay & Albr.
- Hibiscus calodendron Ulbr.
- Hibiscus calyculatus (Hochr.) M.H.Hanes, G.E.Schatz & Callm.
- Hibiscus calyphyllus Cav.
- Hibiscus cameronii Knowles & Westc.
- Hibiscus campanulatus A.J.Perkins
- Hibiscus cannabinus L.
- Hibiscus capitalensis Krapov. & Fryxell
- Hibiscus castroi Baker f. & Exell
- Hibiscus celebicus Koord.
- Hibiscus ceratophorus Thulin
- Hibiscus cerradoensis M.Y.Menzel, Fryxell & F.D.Wilson
- Hibiscus chancoae Krapov. & Fryxell
- Hibiscus chapadensis Krapov. & Fryxell
- Hibiscus chrysinocolla McLay & S.J.Dillon
- Hibiscus chrysochaetus Ulbr.
- Hibiscus citrinus Fryxell
- Hibiscus clayi O.Deg. & I.Deg.
- Hibiscus coatesii F.Muell.
- Hibiscus coccineus Walter
- Hibiscus cochlearifer Borss.Waalk.
- Hibiscus coddii Exell
- Hibiscus colimensis Fryxell
- Hibiscus columnaris Cav.
- Hibiscus commixtus Fryxell & Krapov.
- Hibiscus comoensis A.Chev. ex Hutch. & Dalziel
- Hibiscus comorensis Baill.
- Hibiscus conceptionis Fryxell & Krapov.
- Hibiscus congestifloroides Bân
- Hibiscus congestiflorus Hochr.
- Hibiscus conradsii Ulbr.
- Hibiscus contortus Phuph. & S.Gardner
- Hibiscus convolvulaceus Hassk.
- Hibiscus cooperi J.J.Veitch
- Hibiscus cordifolius Mill.
- Hibiscus corditectus Hochr.
- Hibiscus corymbosus Hochst. ex A.Rich.
- Hibiscus costatus A.Rich.
- Hibiscus coulteri Harv. ex A.Gray
- Hibiscus crassinervius Hochst. ex A.Rich.
- Hibiscus cuanzensis Exell & Mendonça
- Hibiscus cucurbitaceus A.St.-Hil.
- Hibiscus cummingii Wannan

== D ==
- Hibiscus dalbertisii F.Muell.
- Hibiscus dasycalyx S.F.Blake & Shiller
- Hibiscus debeerstii De Wild. & T.Durand
- Hibiscus decaspermus Koord. & Valeton
- Hibiscus deflersii Schweinf. ex Cufod.
- Hibiscus denudatus Benth.
- Hibiscus dimidiatus Schrank
- Hibiscus dinteri Hochr.
- Hibiscus dioscorides A.G.Mill.
- Hibiscus diplocrater Hochr.
- Hibiscus diriffan A.G.Mill.
- Hibiscus discolorifolius Hochr.
- Hibiscus discophorus Hochr.
- Hibiscus divaricatus Graham
- Hibiscus diversifolius Jacq.
- Hibiscus dongolensis Caill. ex Delile
- Hibiscus donianus D.Dietr.
- Hibiscus drummondii Turcz.

== E ==
- Hibiscus elatus Sw.
- Hibiscus elegans Standl.
- Hibiscus elliottiae Harv.
- Hibiscus ellipticifolius Borss.Waalk.
- Hibiscus ellisii Baker
- Hibiscus elongatifolius Hochr.
- Hibiscus engleri K.Schum.
- Hibiscus eriospermus Hochst. ex Cufod.
- Hibiscus erlangeri (Gürke) Thulin
- Hibiscus erodiifolius Hochr. & Humbert
- Hibiscus escobariae Fryxell
- Hibiscus exellii Baker f.

== F ==
- Hibiscus fabiana Cheek
- Hibiscus fallax Craven, F.D.Wilson & Fryxell
- Hibiscus fanambanensis M.Pignal & Phillipson
- Hibiscus faulknerae Vollesen
- Hibiscus ferreirae Fryxell & Krapov.
- Hibiscus ferrugineus Cav.
- Hibiscus ficalhoanus Exell & Mendonça
- Hibiscus fijiensis F.D.Wilson
- Hibiscus fischeri Ulbr.
- Hibiscus flagelliformis A.St.-Hil.
- Hibiscus flavifolius Ulbr.
- Hibiscus flavoroseus Baker f.
- Hibiscus fleckii Gürke
- Hibiscus floccosus Mast.
- Hibiscus fluminis-aprili Ulbr.
- Hibiscus forsteri F.D.Wilson
- Hibiscus fragilis DC.
- Hibiscus fritzscheae Exell & Mendonça
- Hibiscus fryxellii Mabb.
- Hibiscus fugosioides Hiern
- Hibiscus furcellatus Desr.
- Hibiscus fuscus Garcke

== G ==
- Hibiscus gagnepainii Borss.Waalk.
- Hibiscus garambensis Hauman
- Hibiscus genevei Bojer ex Hook.
- Hibiscus geranioides A.Cunn. ex Benth.
- Hibiscus gilletii De Wild.
- Hibiscus glaber Matsum. ex Nakai
- Hibiscus glandulifer Craib
- Hibiscus goldsworthii F.Muell.
- Hibiscus goossensii (Hauman) F.D.Wilson
- Hibiscus gossweileri Sprague
- Hibiscus gourmania Hutch. & Dalziel
- Hibiscus grandidieri Baill.
- Hibiscus grandiflorus Michx.
- Hibiscus grandistipulatus (Hochr.) Hochr.
- Hibiscus graniticus Wannan
- Hibiscus greenwayi Baker f.
- Hibiscus gregoryi Krapov. & Fryxell
- Hibiscus grewioides Baker f.
- Hibiscus guerkeanus Hochr.
- Hibiscus gwandensis Exell

== H ==
- Hibiscus hamabo Siebold & Zucc.
- Hibiscus hareyae L.A.J.Thomson & Cheek
- Hibiscus hasslerianus Hochr.
- Hibiscus haynaldii F.Muell.
- Hibiscus henningsianus Gürke
- Hibiscus heterophyllus Vent.
- Hibiscus hilarianus Krapov. & Fryxell
- Hibiscus hildebrandtii Sprague & Hutch.
- Hibiscus hirtus L.
- Hibiscus hispidissimus Griff.
- Hibiscus hochreutineri Krapov. & Fryxell
- Hibiscus hochstetteri Cufod.
- Hibiscus hockii De Wild.
- Hibiscus holstii Mwachala
- Hibiscus homblei De Wild.
- Hibiscus hoshiarpurensis T.K.Paul & M.P.Nayar
- Hibiscus huillensis Hiern
- Hibiscus hundtii Exell & Mendonça

== I – J ==
- Hibiscus indicus (Burm.f.) Hochr.
- Hibiscus inimicus Craven, F.D.Wilson & Fryxell
- Hibiscus insularis Endl.
- Hibiscus isalensis Hochr. & Humbert
- Hibiscus itirapinensis Krapov. & Fryxell
- Hibiscus jacksonianus Exell
- Hibiscus jaliscensis Fryxell

== K ==
- Hibiscus kabuyeanus Mwachala
- Hibiscus kaute L.A.J.Thomson & Butaud
- Hibiscus keilii Ulbr.
- Hibiscus kenneallyi Craven, F.D.Wilson & Fryxell
- Hibiscus kirkii Mast.
- Hibiscus kirstyae Craven
- Hibiscus kitaibelifolius A.St.-Hil.
- Hibiscus kochii Fryxell
- Hibiscus kokio Hillebr. ex Wawra
- Hibiscus krichauffianus F.Muell.

== L ==
- Hibiscus labordei H.Lév.
- Hibiscus laevis All.
- Hibiscus lamalama Callm., Buerki & Koopman
- Hibiscus lasiococcus Baill.
- Hibiscus laurinus Baill.
- Hibiscus lavateroides Moric. ex Ser.
- Hibiscus laxiflorus A.St.-Hil.
- Hibiscus ledermannii Ulbr.
- Hibiscus leeuwenii Borss.Waalk.
- Hibiscus leptocladus Benth.
- Hibiscus leviseminus M.G.Gilbert, Y.Tang & Dorr
- Hibiscus liliastrum Hochr.
- Hibiscus liliazanza Hochr.
- Hibiscus liliiflorus Cav.
- Hibiscus loandensis Hiern
- Hibiscus lobatus (Murray) Kuntze
- Hibiscus lonchosepalus Hochr.
- Hibiscus longifilus Fryxell
- Hibiscus longisepalus Hochr.
- Hibiscus ludwigii Eckl. & Zeyh.
- Hibiscus lunariifolius Willd.

== M ==
- Hibiscus mabberleyi L.A.J.Thomson
- Hibiscus macilwraithensis (Fryxell) Craven & B.E.Pfeil
- Hibiscus macranthus Hochst. ex A.Rich.
- Hibiscus macrogonus Baill.
- Hibiscus macrophyllus Roxb. ex Hornem.
- Hibiscus macropodus Wagner & Vierh.
- Hibiscus maculatus Lam.
- Hibiscus macverryi L.A.J.Thomson & Braglia
- Hibiscus makinoi Jôtani & H.Ohba
- Hibiscus malacophyllus Balf.f.
- Hibiscus malacospermus (Turcz.) E.Mey. ex Harv.
- Hibiscus mandrarensis Humbert ex Hochr.
- Hibiscus mangindranensis Hochr.
- Hibiscus manuripiensis Krapov.
- Hibiscus marenitensis Craven, F.D.Wilson & Fryxell
- Hibiscus mariae Krapov.
- Hibiscus marioniae Dorr
- Hibiscus marlothianus K.Schum.
- Hibiscus martianus Zucc.
- Hibiscus masasianus Mwachala
- Hibiscus mastersianus Hiern
- Hibiscus matogrossensis Krapov. & Fryxell
- Hibiscus mechowii Garcke
- Hibiscus megistanthus Hochr.
- Hibiscus menzeliae F.D.Wilson & Byrnes
- Hibiscus meraukensis Hochr.
- Hibiscus merxmuelleri Roessler
- Hibiscus mesnyi Laness.
- Hibiscus meyeri Harv.
- Hibiscus meyeri-johannis Ulbr.
- Hibiscus micranthus L.f.
- Hibiscus minkebeensis Burg
- Hibiscus minutibracteolus F.D.Wilson
- Hibiscus mongallaensis Baker f.
- Hibiscus moscheutos L.
- Hibiscus moxicoensis Baker f.
- Hibiscus muhamedis Webb
- Hibiscus multiformis A.St.-Hil.
- Hibiscus mutabilis L.
- Hibiscus mutatus N.E.Br.

== N ==
- Hibiscus naegelei Ulbr.
- Hibiscus nanuzae Krapov. & Fryxell
- Hibiscus nelsonii Rose & Standl.
- Hibiscus ngokbanakii Burg
- Hibiscus nigricaulis Baker f.
- Hibiscus noldeae Baker f.
- Hibiscus noli-tangere A.G.Mill.
- Hibiscus normanii F.Muell.

== O ==
- Hibiscus obtusilobus Garcke
- Hibiscus okavangensis Exell
- Hibiscus orbicularis Baill.
- Hibiscus ottoi Exell
- Hibiscus ovalifolius (Forssk.) Vahl
- Hibiscus owariensis P.Beauv.
- Hibiscus oxaliflorus Bojer ex Baker

== P – Q ==
- Hibiscus pachycarpus Exell & Mendonça
- Hibiscus pacificus Nakai ex Jôtani & H.Ohba
- Hibiscus palmatifidus Baker
- Hibiscus palmatus Forssk.
- Hibiscus paludicola Fryxell & Krapov.
- Hibiscus paolii Mattei
- Hibiscus papuanus K.Schum. & Lauterb.
- Hibiscus paramutabilis L.H.Bailey
- Hibiscus parkinsonii C.E.C.Fisch.
- Hibiscus partitus (Hochr.) F.D.Wilson
- Hibiscus paulae Krapov.
- Hibiscus pedunculatus L.f.
- Hibiscus peralbus Fryxell
- Hibiscus peripteroides Fryxell
- Hibiscus perrieri Hochr.
- Hibiscus peruvianus R.E.Fr.
- Hibiscus peterianus Gürke
- Hibiscus petherickii Craven, F.D.Wilson & Fryxell
- Hibiscus phanerandrus Baker
- Hibiscus phoeniceus Jacq.
- Hibiscus phyllochlaenus F.Muell.
- Hibiscus physaloides Guill. & Perr.
- Hibiscus platanifolius (Willd.) Sweet
- Hibiscus platycalyx Mast.
- Hibiscus pleijtei Borss.Waalk.
- Hibiscus poeppigii (Spreng.) Garcke
- Hibiscus pohlii Gürke
- Hibiscus poilanei Gagnep.
- Hibiscus ponticus Rupr.
- Hibiscus praeteritus R.A.Dyer
- Hibiscus propulsator Craven & B.E.Pfeil
- Hibiscus prunifolius F.Dietr.
- Hibiscus pruriosus Exell & Mendonça
- Hibiscus pseudohirtus Hochr.
- Hibiscus pseudotiliaceus Borss.Waalk.
- Hibiscus pterocarpoides Hochr.
- Hibiscus pulvinulifer Borss.Waalk.
- Hibiscus purpureus Forssk.
- Hibiscus purpusii Brandegee
- Hibiscus pusillus Thunb.
- Hibiscus quattenensis A.G.Mill. & Thulin

== R ==
- Hibiscus radiatus Cav.
- Hibiscus reekmansii F.D.Wilson
- Hibiscus reflexus Craven, F.D.Wilson & Fryxell
- Hibiscus retrobracteatus (Hochr.) M.M.Hanes & Callm.
- Hibiscus rhabdotospermus Garcke
- Hibiscus rhodanthus Gürke
- Hibiscus ribifolius A.Gray
- Hibiscus riceae Craven, F.D.Wilson & Fryxell
- Hibiscus richardsiae Exell
- Hibiscus richardsonii Sweet ex Lindl.
- Hibiscus × rosa-sinensis L.
- Hibiscus rostellatus Guill. & Perr.
- Hibiscus rubriflorus Baker f.
- Hibiscus rupicola Exell
- Hibiscus rutenbergii Garcke

== S ==
- Hibiscus sabdariffa L.
- Hibiscus × sabei Weckesser
- Hibiscus sabiensis Exell
- Hibiscus saddii Krapov. & Fryxell
- Hibiscus sakamaliensis Hochr.
- Hibiscus sankowskyorum Craven
- Hibiscus saponarius Craven
- Hibiscus saxatilis J.M.Wood & Evans
- Hibiscus saxicola Ulbr.
- Hibiscus schinzii Gürke
- Hibiscus schizopetalus (Mast.) Hook.f.
- Hibiscus schlechteri Lauterb.
- Hibiscus schweinfurthii Gürke
- Hibiscus sciadiolepidus (Hochr.) Borss.Waalk.
- Hibiscus scindicus Stocks
- Hibiscus scotellii Baker f.
- Hibiscus scottii Balf.f.
- Hibiscus sebastianii Fuertes
- Hibiscus seineri Ulbr.
- Hibiscus selesiensis Baker f.
- Hibiscus sepikensis Borss.Waalk.
- Hibiscus setulosus F.Muell.
- Hibiscus shirensis Sprague & Hutch.
- Hibiscus sidiformis Baill.
- Hibiscus similis Blume
- Hibiscus sineaculeatus F.D.Wilson
- Hibiscus sinosyriacus L.H.Bailey
- Hibiscus skeneae Hochr.
- Hibiscus socotranus G.Ll.Lucas
- Hibiscus solanifolius F.Muell.
- Hibiscus somalensis Franch.
- Hibiscus sororius L.
- Hibiscus sparseaculeatus Baker f.
- Hibiscus spartioides Chiov.
- Hibiscus spiralis Cav.
- Hibiscus splendens C.Fraser ex Graham
- Hibiscus splendidus Ulbr.
- Hibiscus squamosus Hochr.
- Hibiscus squarrulosus Craven, F.D.Wilson & Fryxell
- Hibiscus sreenarayanianus Anil Kumar & Ravi
- Hibiscus stenanthus Balf.f.
- Hibiscus stenophyllus Baker
- Hibiscus sterculiifolius (Guill. & Perr.) Steud.
- Hibiscus stewartii Craven, F.D.Wilson & Fryxell
- Hibiscus storckii Seem.
- Hibiscus striatus Cav.
- Hibiscus sturtii Hook.
- Hibiscus subdiversifolius Hochr.
- Hibiscus subreniformis Burtt Davy
- Hibiscus sudanensis Hochr.
- Hibiscus sulfuranthus Ulbr.
- Hibiscus superbus C.A.Gardner
- Hibiscus surattensis L.
- Hibiscus symonii F.D.Wilson & Byrnes
- Hibiscus syriacus L.

== T ==
- Hibiscus taiwanensis S.Y.Hu
- Hibiscus talbotii (Rakshit) T.K.Paul & M.P.Nayer
- Hibiscus teijsmannii Borss.Waalk.
- Hibiscus tenorii Fryxell
- Hibiscus thegaleus Craven, F.D.Wilson & Fryxell
- Hibiscus thespesianus Baill.
- Hibiscus tiliaceus L.
- Hibiscus tisserantii Baker f.
- Hibiscus torrei Baker f.
- Hibiscus townsvillensis Craven
- Hibiscus tozerensis Craven & B.E.Pfeil
- Hibiscus trichonychius Gagnep.
- Hibiscus tridactylites Lindl.
- Hibiscus trilineatus A.St.-Hil. & Naudin
- Hibiscus trilobus Aubl.
- Hibiscus trionum L.

== U – V ==
- Hibiscus uncinellus Moc. & Sessé ex DC.
- Hibiscus upingtoniae Gürke
- Hibiscus urticifolius A.St.-Hil. & Naudin
- Hibiscus varians Splitg. ex de Vriese
- Hibiscus verbasciformis Klotzsch ex Hochr.
- Hibiscus verecundus McLay & Albr.
- Hibiscus verdcourtii Craven
- Hibiscus vitifolius L.
- Hibiscus vohipahensis M.H.Hanes & G.E.Schatz
- Hibiscus volkensii Gürke

== W – Z ==
- Hibiscus waimeae A.Heller
- Hibiscus waterbergensis Exell
- Hibiscus watsonii W.W.Sm.
- Hibiscus whytei Stapf
- Hibiscus wilsonii Fryxell
- Hibiscus windischii Krapov. & Fryxell
- Hibiscus yunnanensis S.Y.Hu
- Hibiscus zanzibaricus Exell
- Hibiscus zonatus F.Muell.
- Hibiscus zygomorphus Fryxell & S.D.Koch
