= Talipariti =

Former genus of flowering plants

Talipariti was a genus of plants in the mallow family Malvaceae. It is now considered to be a synonym of Hibiscus, in which case its species form the section Hibiscus sect. Azanzae. There were about 22 species, exclusively tropical except for one species whose range extends into temperate areas of Japan and Korea.

== Former species ==
- Talipariti archboldianum (Borss.Waalk.) Fryxell = Hibiscus archboldianus Borss.Waalk. - Native to New Guinea.
- Talipariti aruense (Borss.Waalk.) Fryxell = Hibiscus aruensis Borss.Waalk. - Native to the Aru Islands (Indonesia).
- Talipariti borneense (Airy Shaw) Fryxell = Hibiscus borneensis Airy Shaw - Native to Borneo.
- Talipariti bowersiae Fryxell = Hibiscus bowersiae (Fryxell) Craven - Native to Papua New Guinea
- Talipariti celebicum (Koord.) Fryxell = Hibiscus celebicus Koord. - Native to Sulawesi.
- Talipariti dalbertisii (F.Muell.) Fryxell = Hibiscus dalbertisii F.Muell. - Native to New Guinea.
- Talipariti elatum (Sw.) Fryxell = Hibiscus elatus Sw. - Native to Cuba and Jamaica, naturalised across the Caribbean Islands.
- Talipariti ellipticifolium (Borss.Waalk.) Fryxell = Hibiscus ellipticifolius Borss.Waalk. - Native to New Guinea.
- Talipariti glabrum (Matsum. ex Nakai) Fryxell = Hibiscus glaber) Matsum. ex Nakai - Native to Ogasawara-shoto (Bonin Islands) in the northwest Pacific Ocean.
- Talipariti hamabo (Siebold & Zucc.) Fryxell = Hibiscus hamabo Siebold & Zucc. - Native to Zhejiang (China), South Korea, south-central and south Japan and the Nansei-shoto (Okinawa).
- Talipariti hastatum (L.f.) Fryxell = Hibiscus hastatus L.f. - Native to the Society Islands in the South Pacific, and cultivated elsewhere. This species is sometimes included in Hibiscus tiliaceus.
- Talipariti leeuwenii (Borss.Waalk.) Fryxell = Hibiscus leeuwenii Borss.Waalk. - Native to New Guinea.
- Talipariti macrophyllum (Roxb. ex Hornem.) Fryxell = Hibiscus macrophyllus Roxb. ex Hornem. - Native to Southeast Asia (Assam, Bangladesh, Cambodia, south-central China, Java, Laos, Peninsular Malaysia, Myanmar, the Philippines, Thailand and Vietnam, naturalised in Hawaii
- Talipariti pernambucense (Arruda) Bovini = Hibiscus pernambucensis Arruda - native to the Neotropics, from Mexico to southeastern Brazil. This species is sometimes treated as a variety of Hibiscus tiliaceus.
- Talipariti pleijtei (Borss.Waalk.) Fryxell = Hibiscus pleijtei Borss.Waalk. - Native to New Guinea.
- Talipariti pseudotiliaceum (Borss.Waalk.) Fryxell = Hibiscus pseudotiliaceus Borss.Waalk. - Native to the Moluccan Islands.
- Talipariti schlechteri (Lauterb.) Fryxell = Hibiscus schlechteri Lautern. - Native to the Bismarck Archipelago.
- Talipariti sepikense (Borss.Waalk.) Fryxell = Hibiscus sepikensis Borss.Waalk. - Native to New Guinea.
- Talipariti simile (Blume) Fryxell = Hibiscus similis Blume - Native to Bangladesh, Vietnam and Java.
- Talipariti tiliaceum (L.) Fryxell =Hibiscus tiliaceus L. - Native to the Palaeotropics

with three varieties
- Talipariti tiliaceum var. crestaense (Borss.Waalk.) Fryxell = Hibiscus crestaense Borss.Waalk. - Native to Luzon (The Philippines).
- Talipariti tiliaceum var. potteri = Hibiscus tiliaceus var. potteri (O.Deg. & Greenwell) H.St.John - Native to Hawaii.
- Talipariti tiliaceum var. tiliaceum = Hibiscus tiliaceus var. tiliaceus - Native to tropical Africa and Asia, with the type specimen from Sri Lanka.
