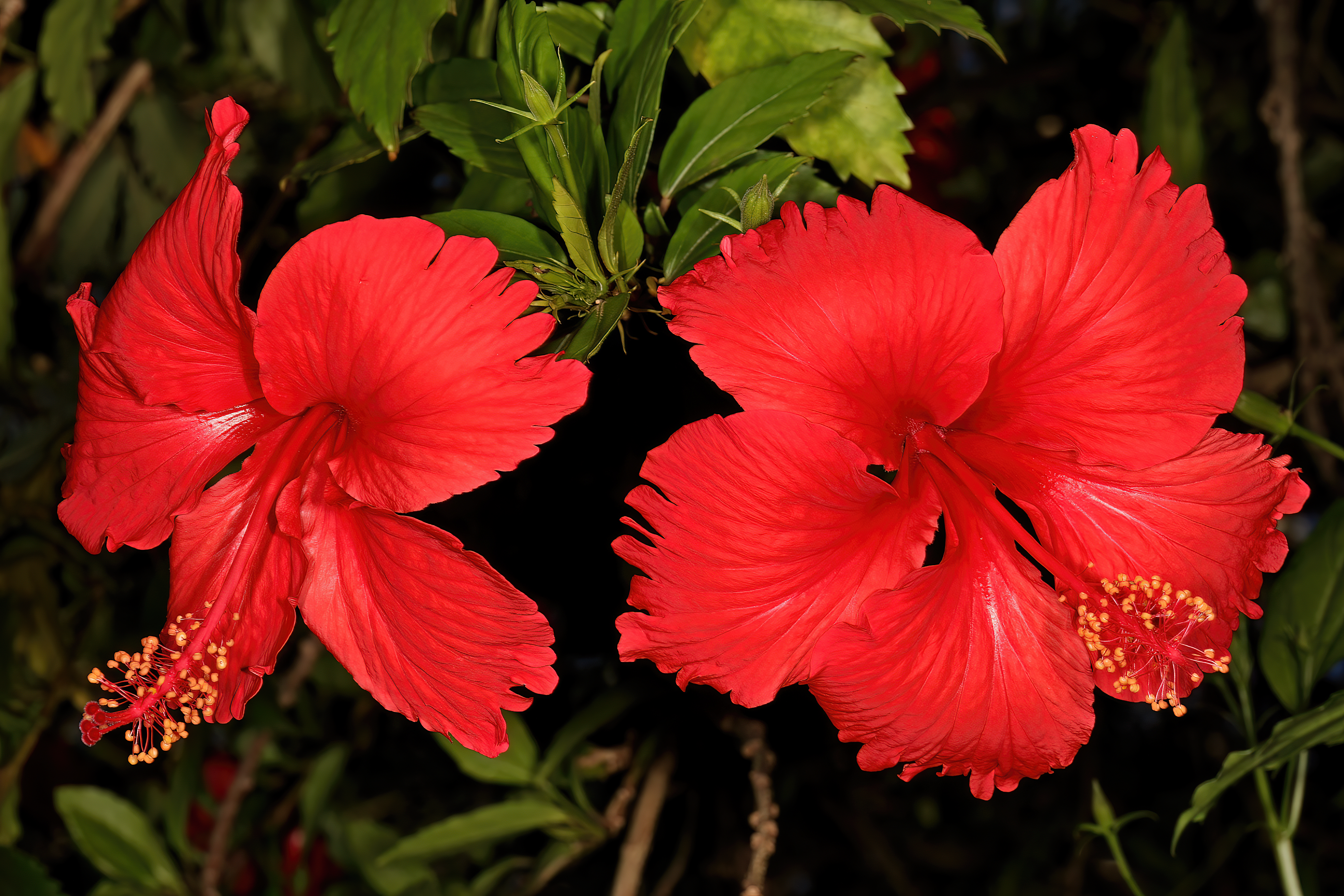
- Flowers at the Manie van der Schijff Botanical Garden
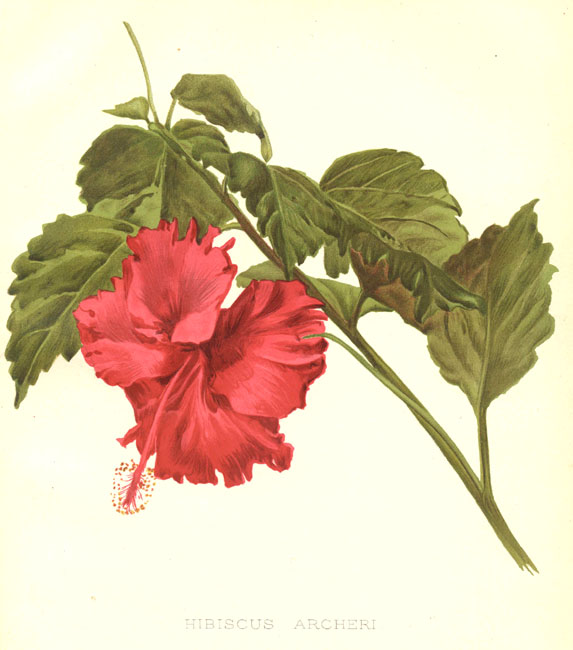
- Botanical illustration

Scientific classification
- Kingdom: Plantae
- Clade: Tracheophytes
- Clade: Angiosperms
- Clade: Eudicots
- Clade: Rosids
- Order: Malvales
- Family: Malvaceae
- Genus: Hibiscus
- Species: H. × archeri

Binomial name
- Hibiscus × archeri W.Watson

= Hibiscus × archeri =

Species of plant

Hibiscus × archeri, the red hibiscus, is an artificial hybrid species of flowering plant in the family Malvaceae. Its parents are Hibiscus schizopetalus and Hibiscus × rosa-sinensis (itself a hybrid). A shrub or small tree, there appear to be a number of cultivars.

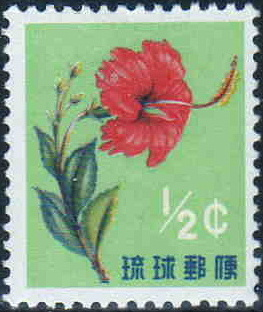
On a postage stamp of the Government of the Ryukyu Islands

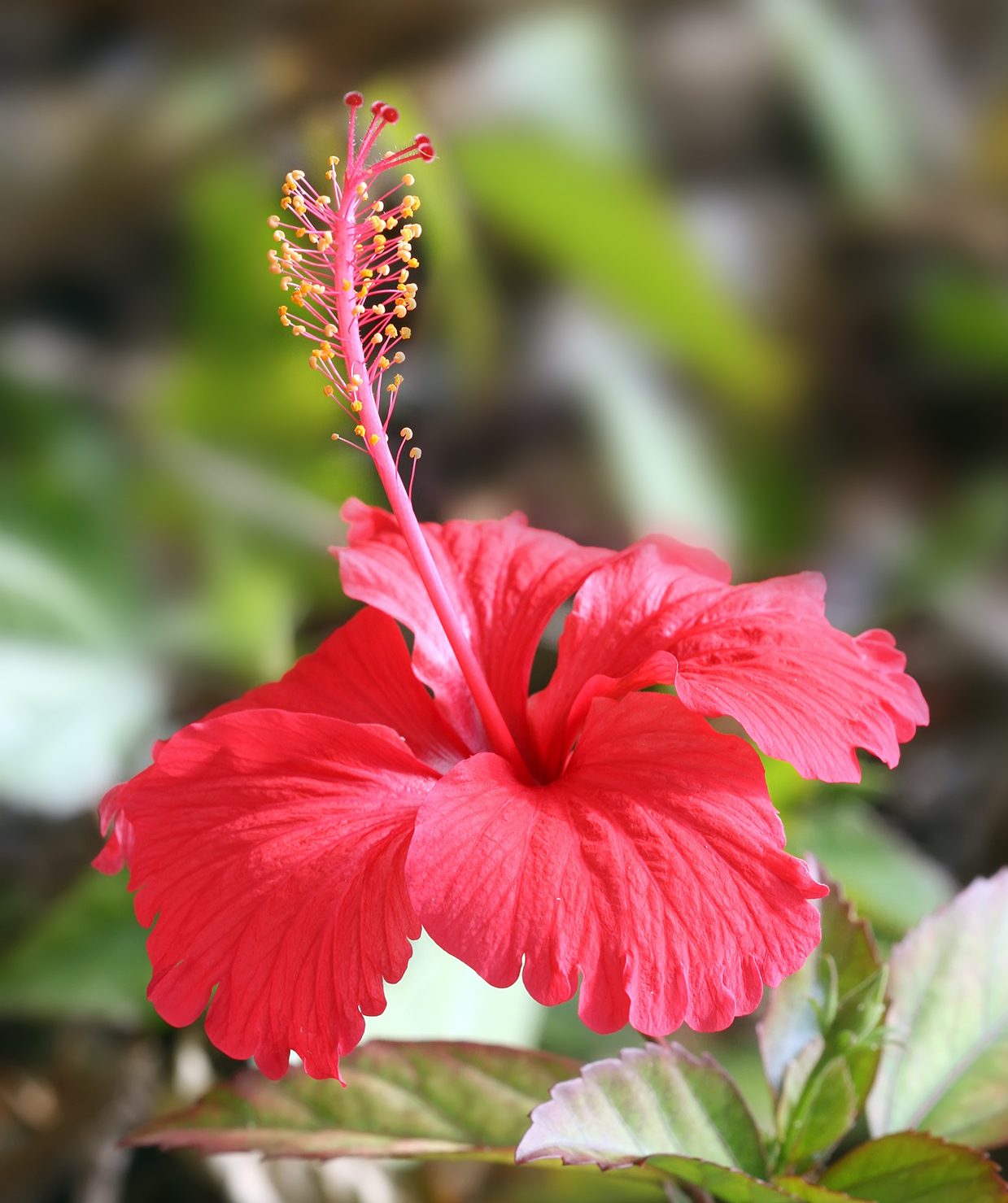
Hibiscus 'Andersonii'

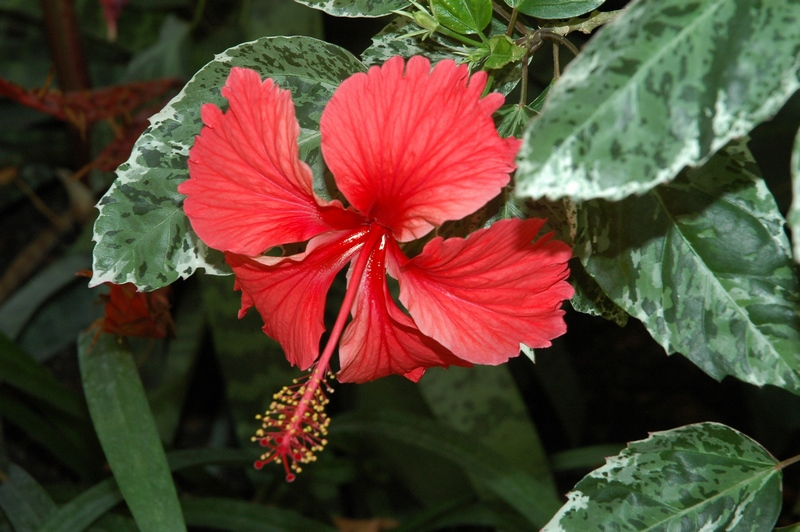
Hibiscus 'Cooperi'

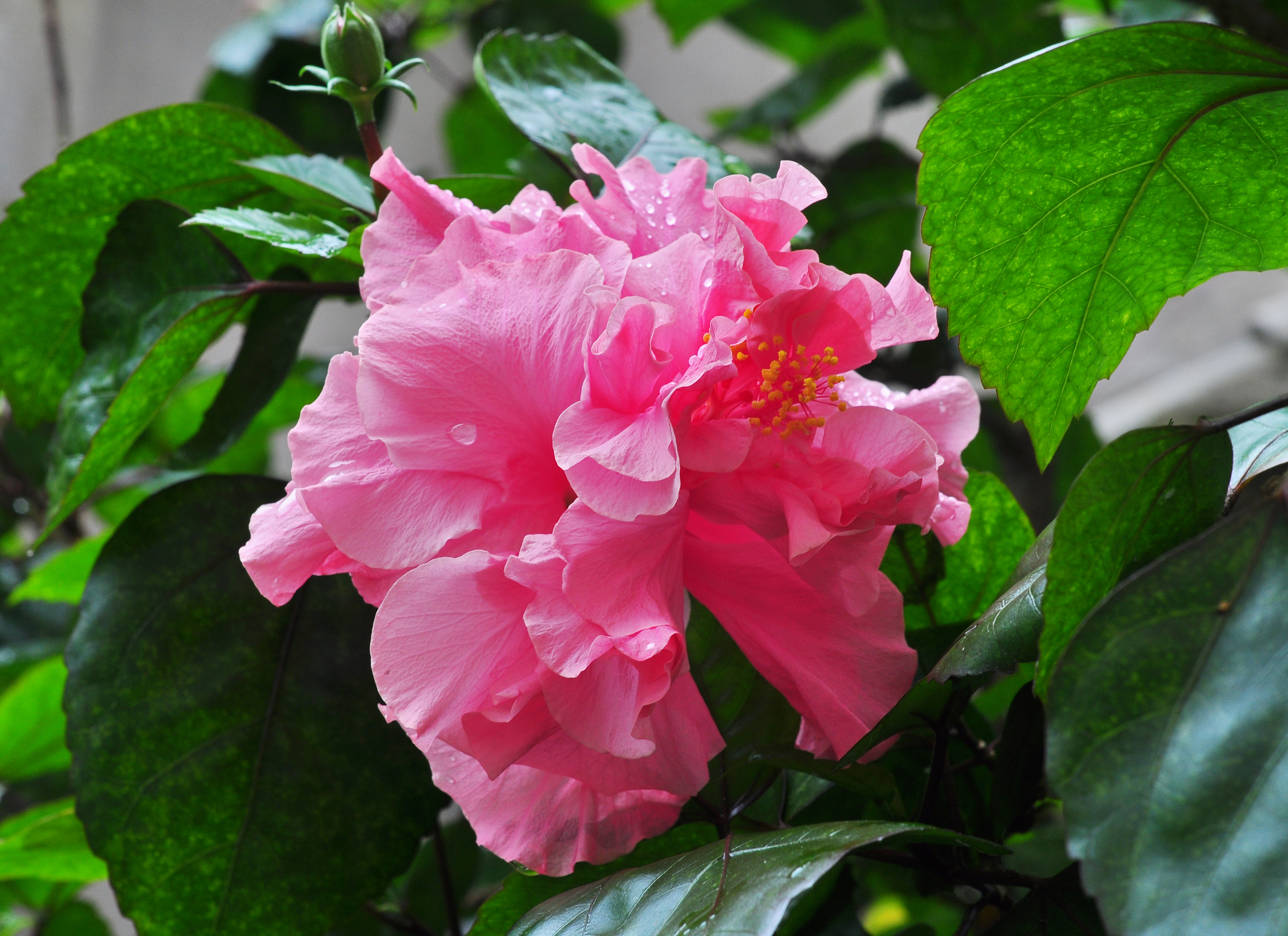
Hibiscus 'Double Psyche'

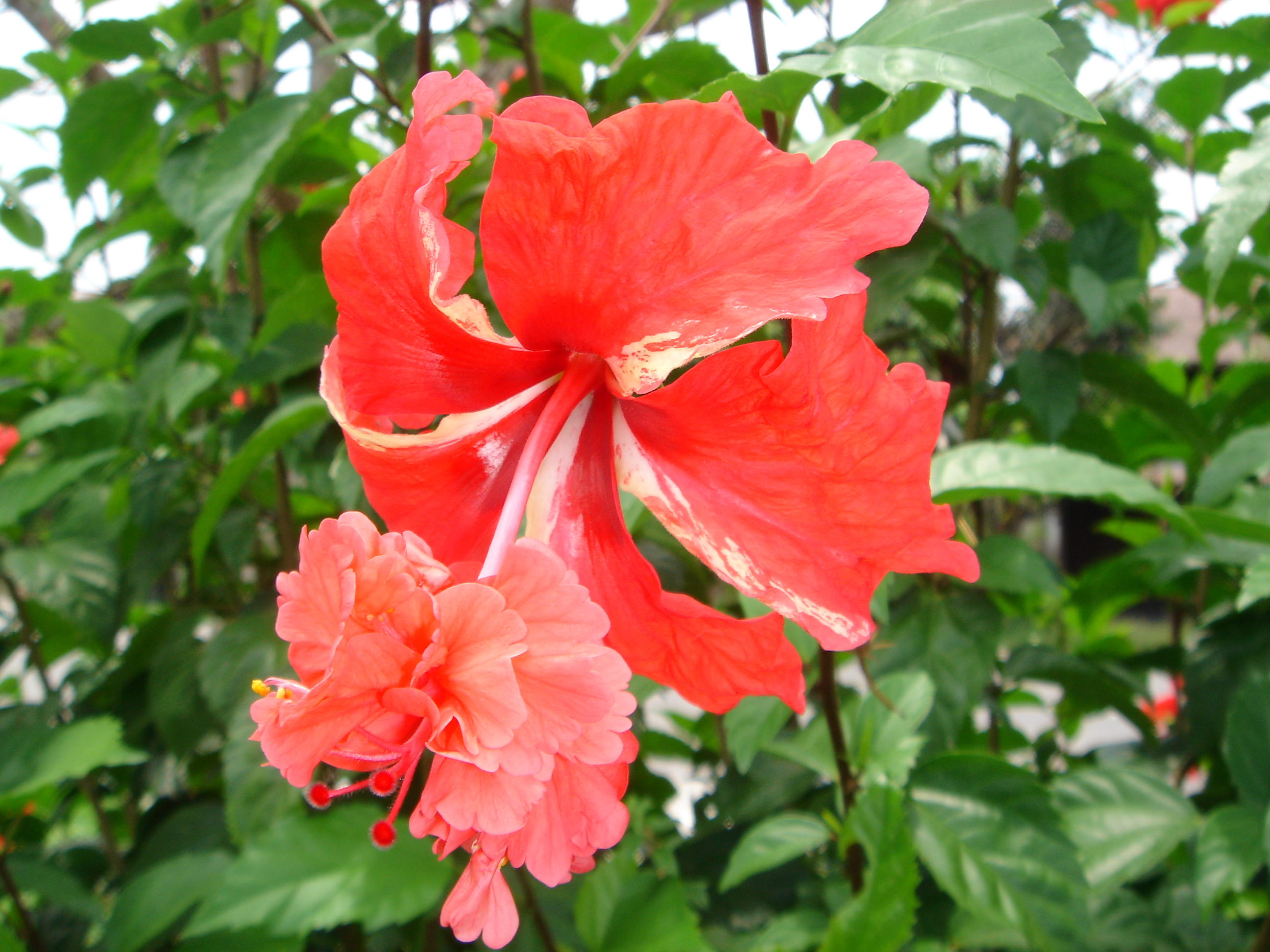
Hibiscus 'El Capitolio'

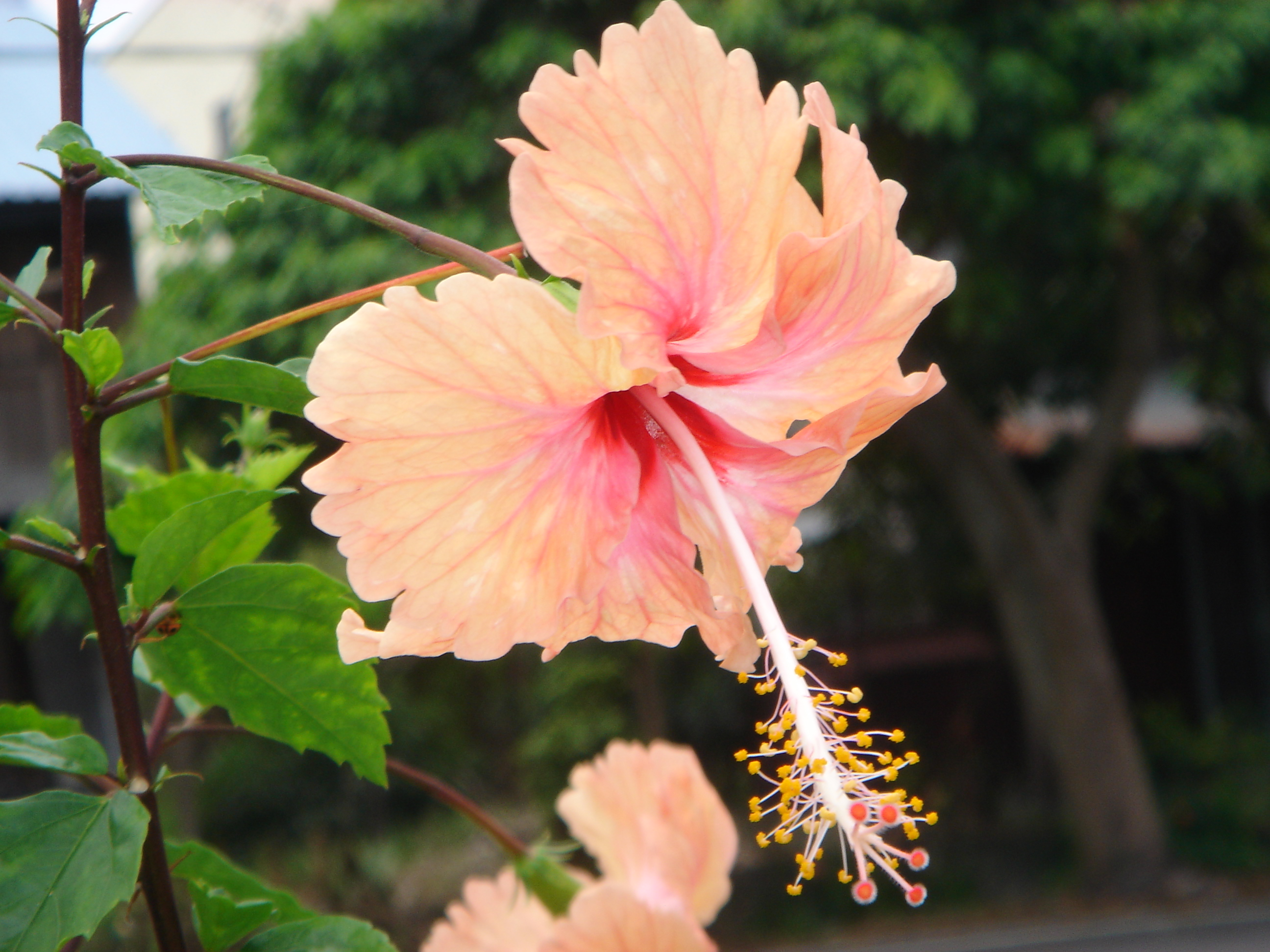
Hibiscus 'Madeline Champion'

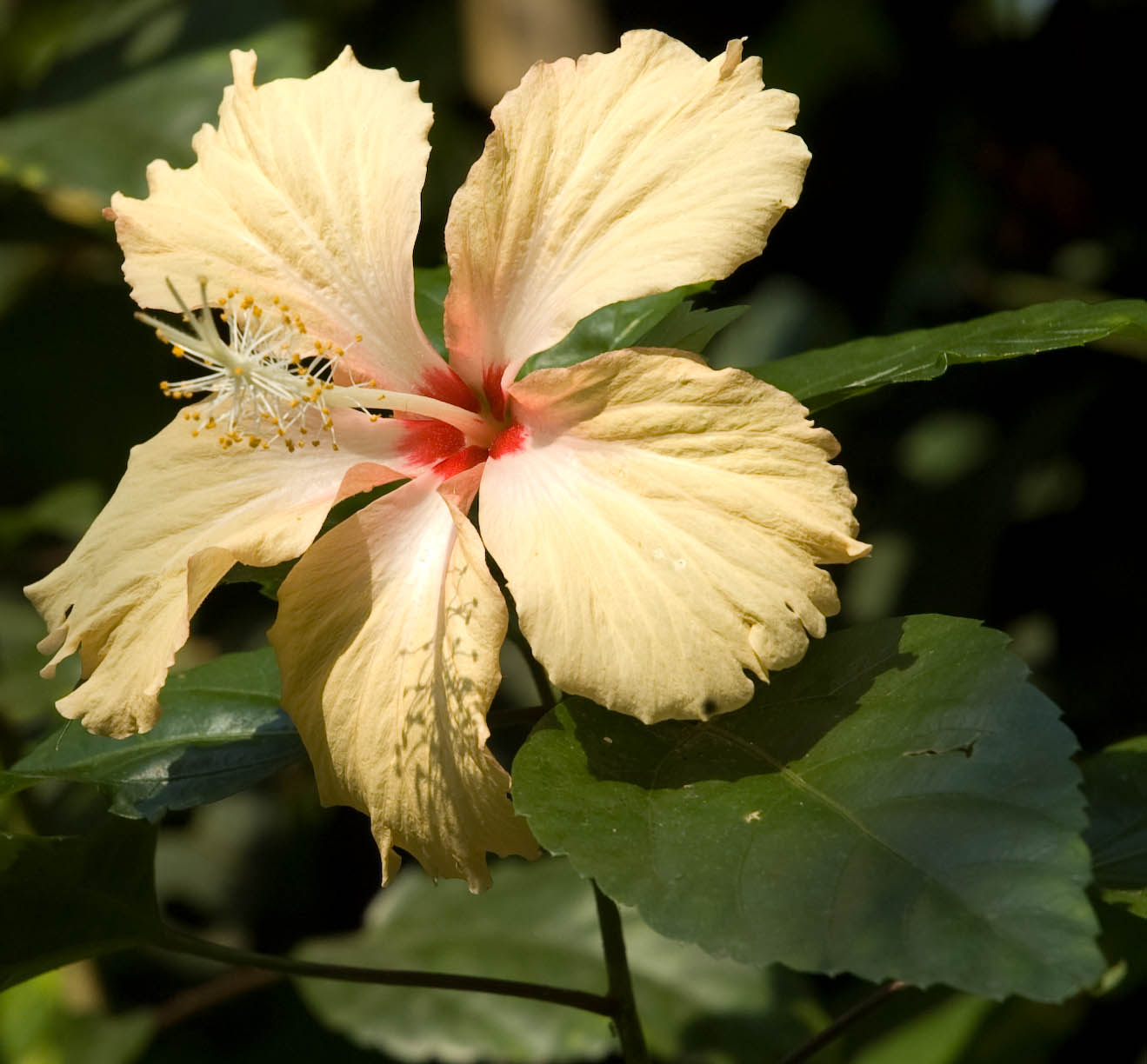
Hibiscus 'Mango Dainty'

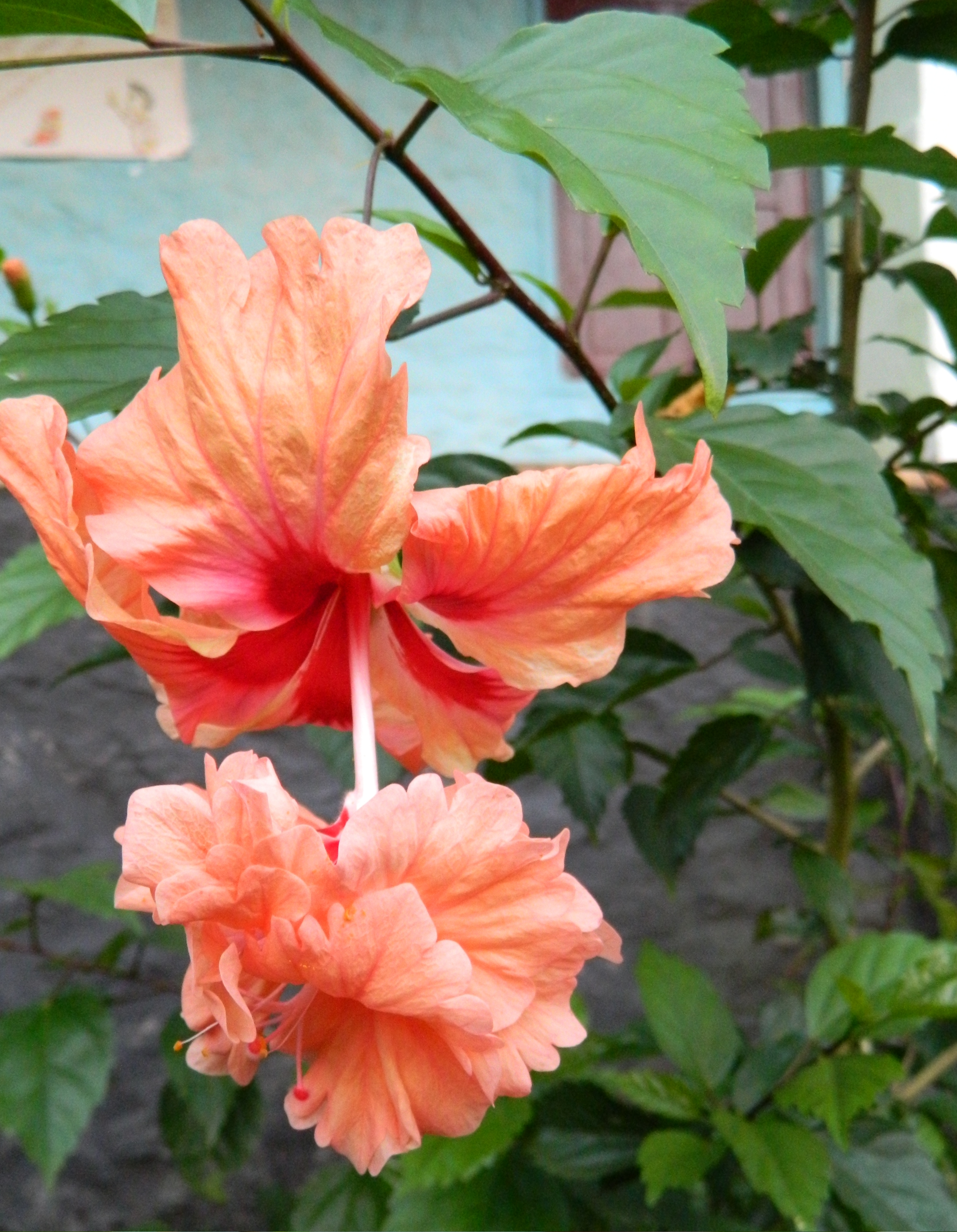
Hibiscus 'Orange El Capitolio'

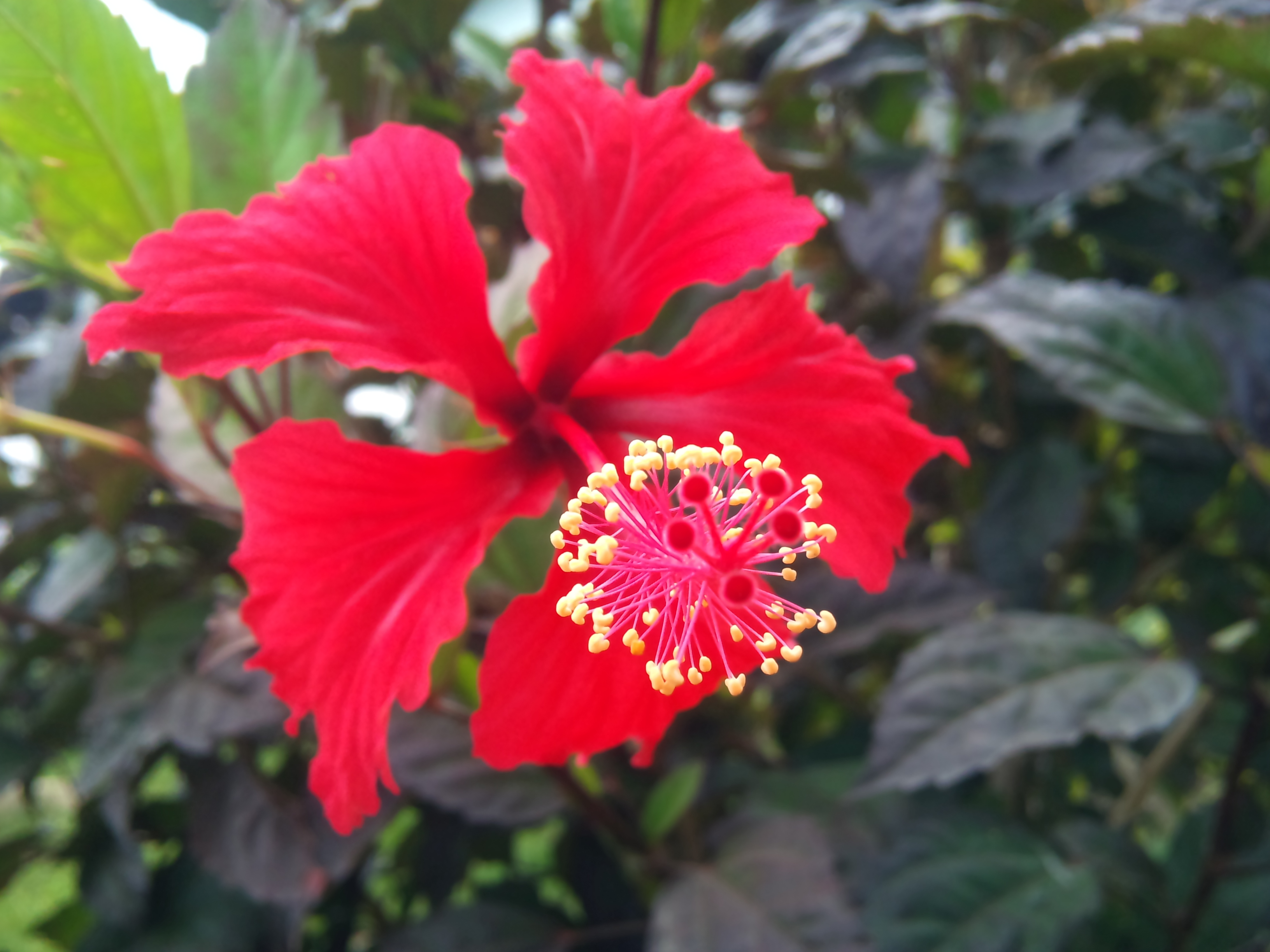
Hibiscus 'Psyche'

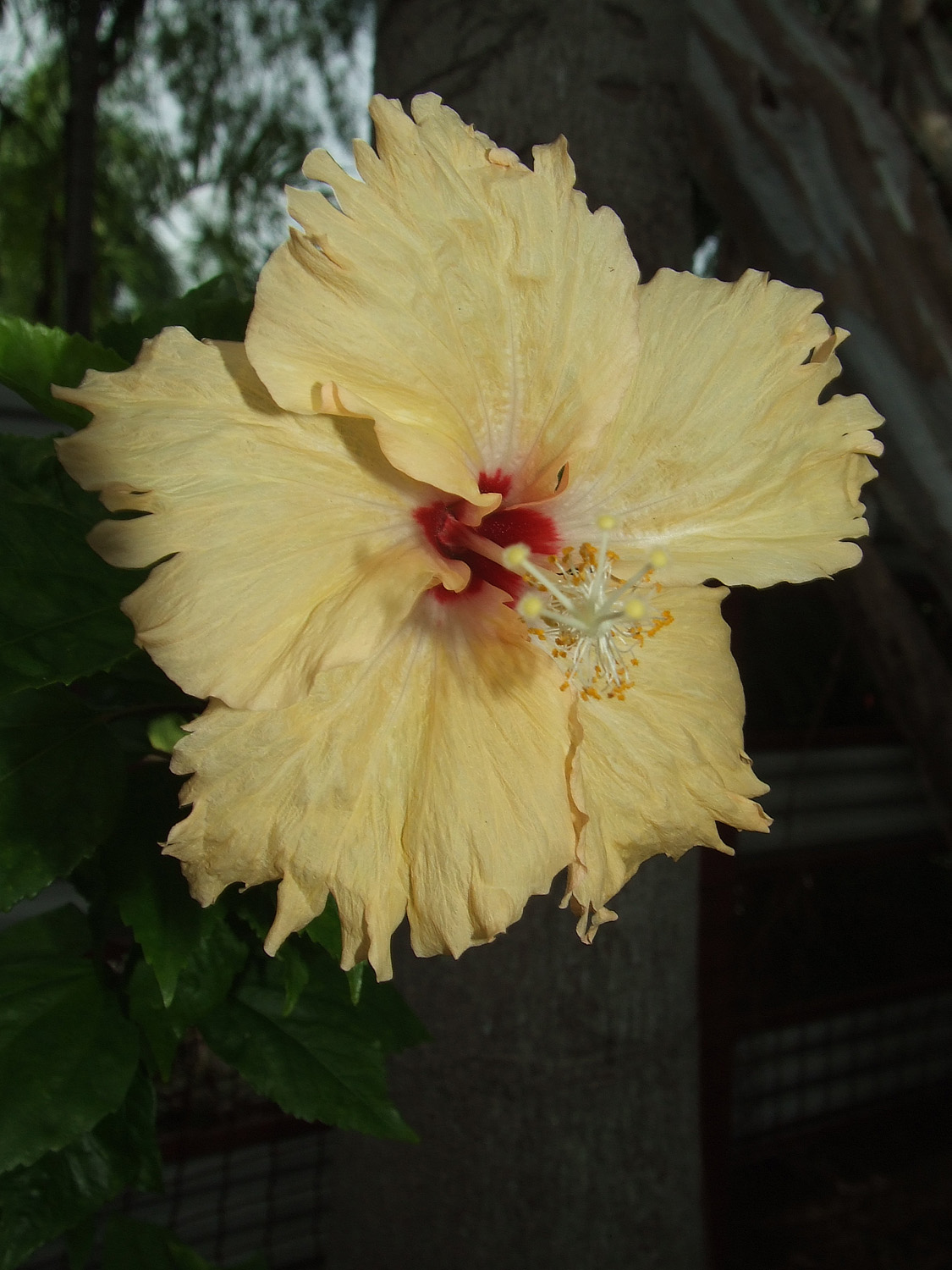
Hibiscus 'Sprinkle Rain'

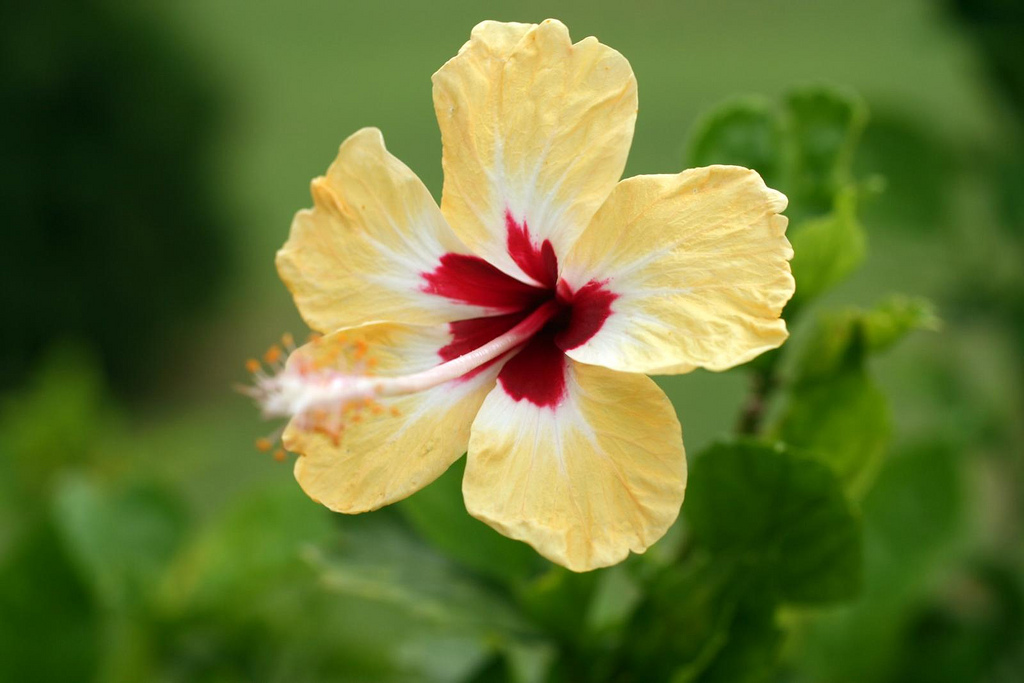
Hibiscus 'Sylvia Goodman'

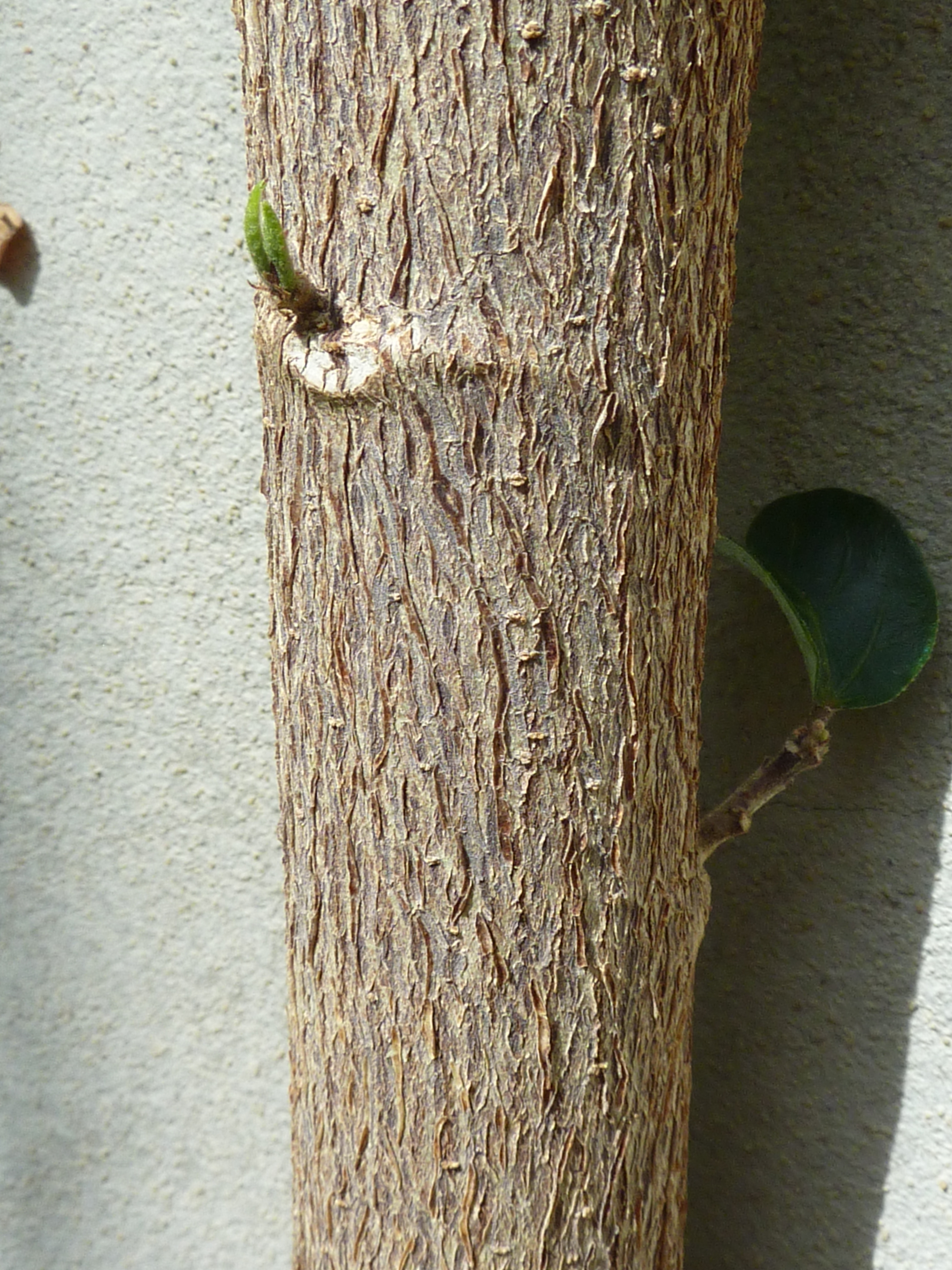
Bark of an individual with a tree growth form
