= Hibiscus storckii =

- Plate by Walter Hood Fitch, 1865

Scientific classification
- Kingdom: Plantae
- Clade: Embryophytes
- Clade: Tracheophytes
- Clade: Spermatophytes
- Clade: Angiosperms
- Clade: Eudicots
- Clade: Rosids
- Order: Malvales
- Family: Malvaceae
- Genus: Hibiscus
- Species: H. storckii

Binomial name
- Hibiscus storckii Seem.

Species of plant

Hibiscus storckii is a species of flowering plant in the family Malvaceae, native to Fiji. It was first described by Berthold Carl Seemann in 1865.
