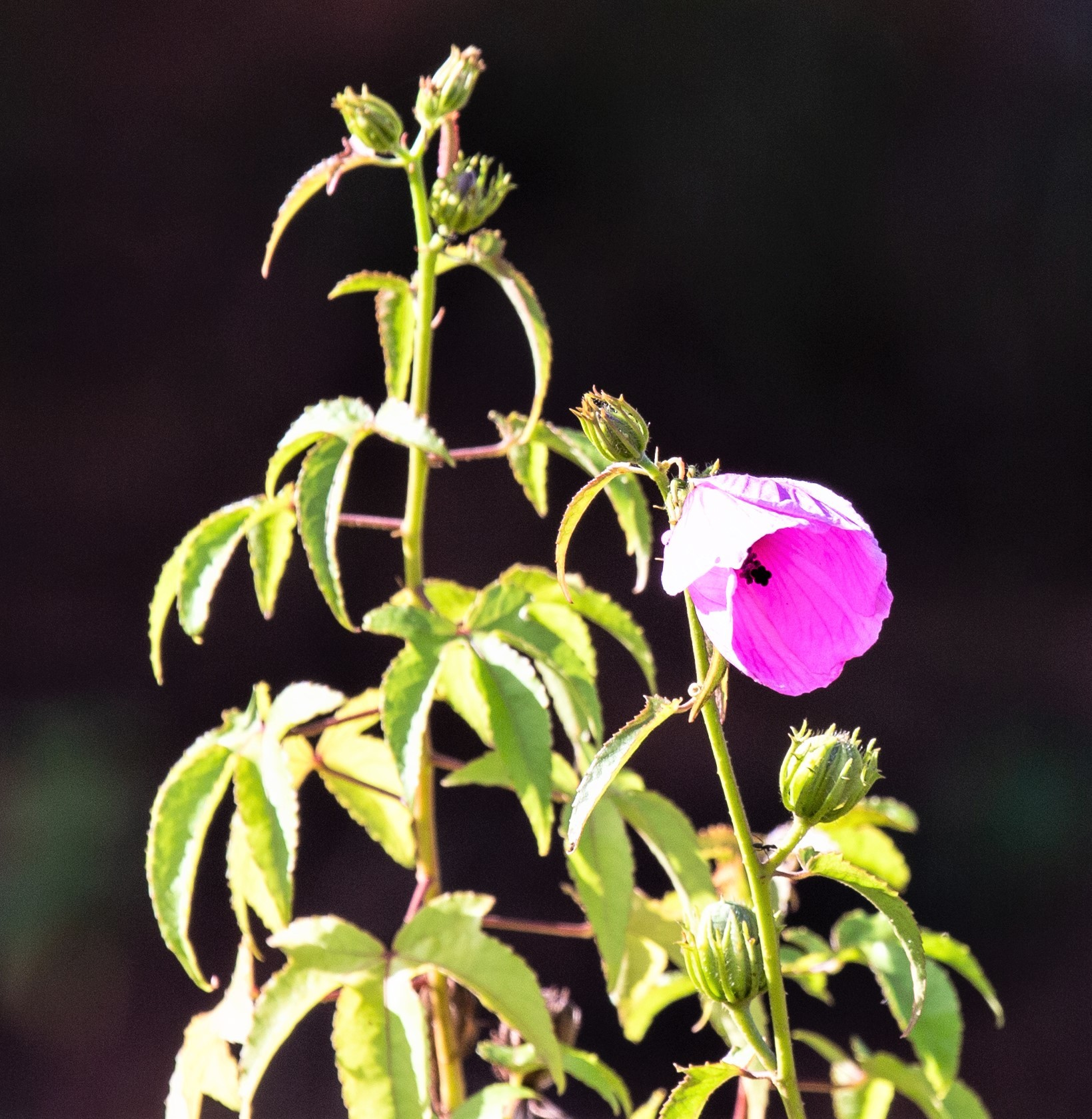

Scientific classification
- Kingdom: Plantae
- Clade: Tracheophytes
- Clade: Angiosperms
- Clade: Eudicots
- Clade: Rosids
- Order: Malvales
- Family: Malvaceae
- Genus: Hibiscus
- Species: H. bifurcatus

Binomial name
- Hibiscus bifurcatus Cav.

= Hibiscus bifurcatus =

Species of flowering plant

Hibiscus bifurcatus, also known as the fork-bracted rose-mallow, is a species of tropical hibiscus native to parts of Central and South America, including Mexico, Peru, and Brazil. The species is typically found in open woodlands, forest margins, and coastal regions, where it benefits from the warm, humid conditions characteristic of these environments. These natural habitats provide the plant with an adequate supply of sunlight, moderate moisture, and well-draining soil, conditions that are crucial for its survival. The plant grows primarily at altitudes ranging from sea level to approximately 1,500 m (4,900 ft). In these Regions, the temperature is relatively stable, with daily high temperatures between 24 and 30 °C (75 and 86 °F) and low temperatures rarely dipping below 18 °C (64 °F). The species is adapted to environments that experience distinct wet and dry seasons, though it prefers conditions with consistent moisture availability throughout the year.

== Habitat ==
In its native habitat, Hibiscus bifurcatus prefers trees that are well-drained, typically loamy or sandy in texture, with moderate organic content. The species is not particularly demanding in terms of soil composition but does require soils that do not retain excessive water, as waterlogged conditions can lead to root rot. Soil pH ranges from 6.0 to 7.5 (slightly acidic to neutral) is ideal for promoting healthy root development. While it can tolerate brief periods of drought, it performs best in environments with consistently moist soils. This characteristic makes it well-suited for cultivation in regions that experience seasonal rainfall patterns or where irrigation can be effectively managed.

Hibiscus bifurcatus thrives in tropical to subtropical climates, where it can be exposed to full sunlight for extended periods. The species is highly sensitive to cold temperatures and will not survive in areas where frost or freezing conditions are common. It has a low tolerance to frost, and exposure to temperatures below 0 °C (32 °F) can result in significant damage to the plant's tissues. In terms of relative humidity, the plant requires environments with moderate to high humidity, as it is native to humid tropical regions. Indoor cultivation in regions with low ambient humidity may necessitate supplementary humidity management, such as misting or the use of humidity trays, to maintain optimal growth conditions.

== Appearance ==
The leaves of Hibiscus bifurcatus are one of the species' most distinctive features. Unlike the broader, simple leaves of many other hibiscus species, H. bifurcatus exhibits bifurcated or forked leaves, with each leaf divided into two primary lobes. These deeply divided leaves contribute to the plant's unique morphological appearance. The shape of the leaves can range from lanceolate to ovate, with finely serrated margins. The leaf color is typically a rich dark green, providing a contrasting backdrop for the plant's flowers. The leaf arrangement is alternate, with leaves growing on slender petioles. The venation is pinnate, with the primary vein running centrally, branching into secondary veins that radiate outward toward the leaf edges

Hibiscus bifurcatus produces large, funnel-shaped flowers that are typically 5–15 cm (2.0–5.9 in) across. The flowers are characterized by vibrant shades of red, pink, or occasionally white, depending on the specific cultivar or environmental conditions. Each flower consists of five petals, which are slightly overlapping, and a prominent central staminal column, which is a key feature of hibiscus flowers. The central stamen extends beyond the petals, giving the bloom its characteristic "funnel" appearance. The flowers of Hibiscus bifurcatus exhibit short-lived blooms, typically lasting only one or two days before wilting. However, the plant produces a succession of flowers over an extended period, especially during the growing season. The flowers are dioecious, containing both male and female reproductive organs, and are primarily pollinated by insects, particularly bees and butterflies. The large, brightly colored flowers and their copious nectar attract a variety of pollinators, contributing to the species' ecological role in its native environment.

== Culture ==
Hibiscus bifurcatus typically grows as a woody shrub or small tree, with a bushy growth habit. Mature plants can reach 6 to 15 ft (1.8 to 4.6 m) in height, although they may exceed this range under optimal conditions. The plant tends to have multiple branching and a relatively dense canopy, which contributes to its ornamental appeal. In its natural habitat, Hibiscus bifurcatus often assumes a multi-stemmed form, though it can be pruned or trained into a more tree-like structure. The stem is woody and may exhibit greenish-brown or grayish bark. When grown as a shrub or in containerized environments, the plant may have a spreading habit, with a lateral growth pattern that can cover a wide area.

As a tropical species, Hibiscus bifurcatus requires full sunlight for a minimum of six hours per day to support healthy growth and flowering. In areas with particularly intense sunlight, the plant may benefit from afternoon shade to prevent sunburn on the foliage, especially during the hottest part of the day. The species is highly sensitive to cold temperatures and will not tolerate frost. In regions where temperatures fall below 0 °C (32 °F), it is advisable to grow the plant in containers that can be moved indoors during winter or to cultivate it in greenhouses with temperature control.

Hibiscus bifurcatus grows best in well-draining, loamy or sandy soils that are rich in organic matter. The species is not highly particular about soil type but will benefit from the incorporation of organic matter to improve soil structure and moisture retention. During the growing season, the plant benefits from regular fertilization to support healthy growth and abundant flowering. A balanced, slow-release fertilizer that includes a mix of nitrogen (N), phosphorus (P), and potassium (K) is recommended. Fertilization should occur every 4–6 weeks during the spring and summer, while in winter, when growth slows, fertilizer application should be reduced or suspended.
