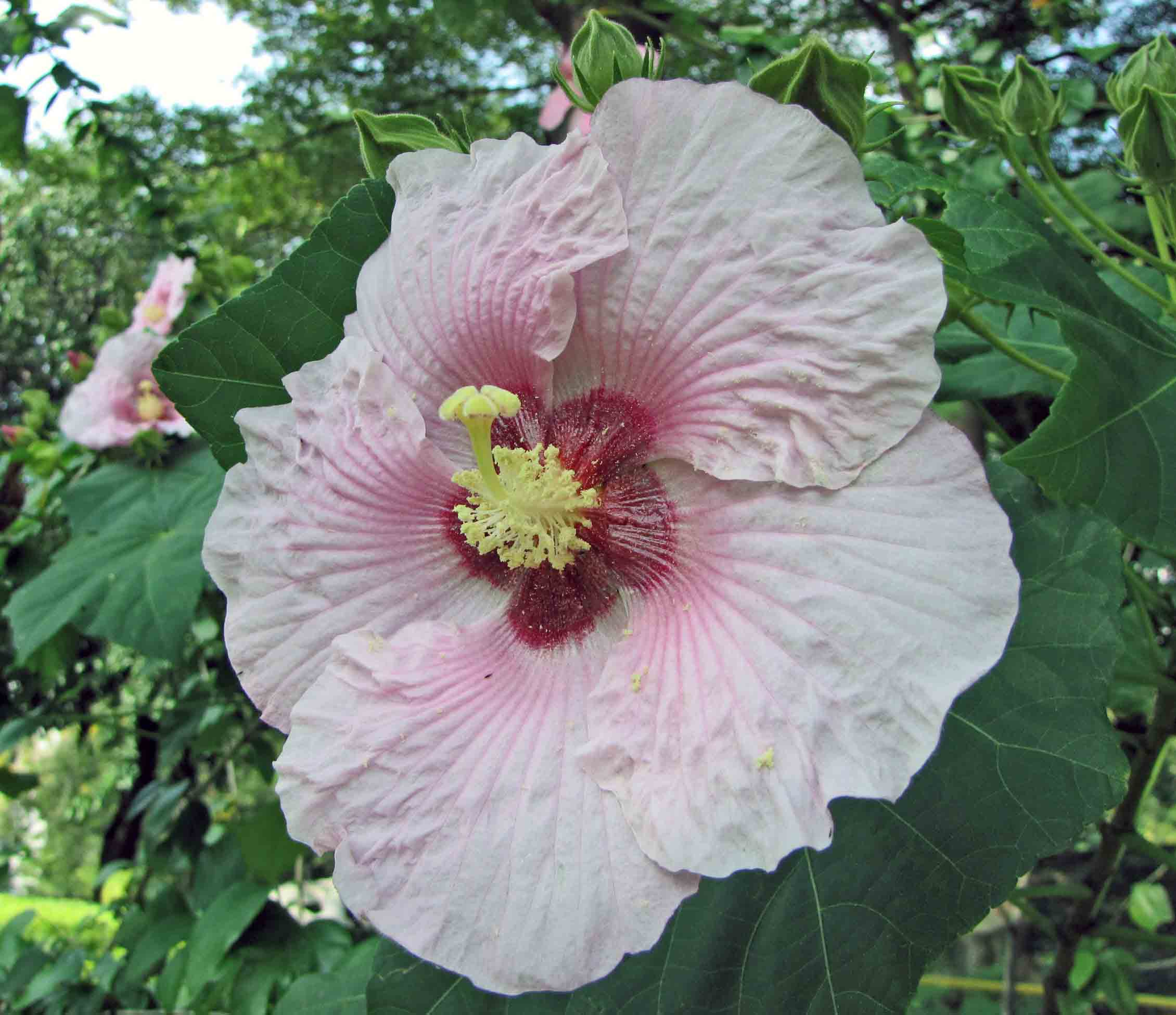
- Flower
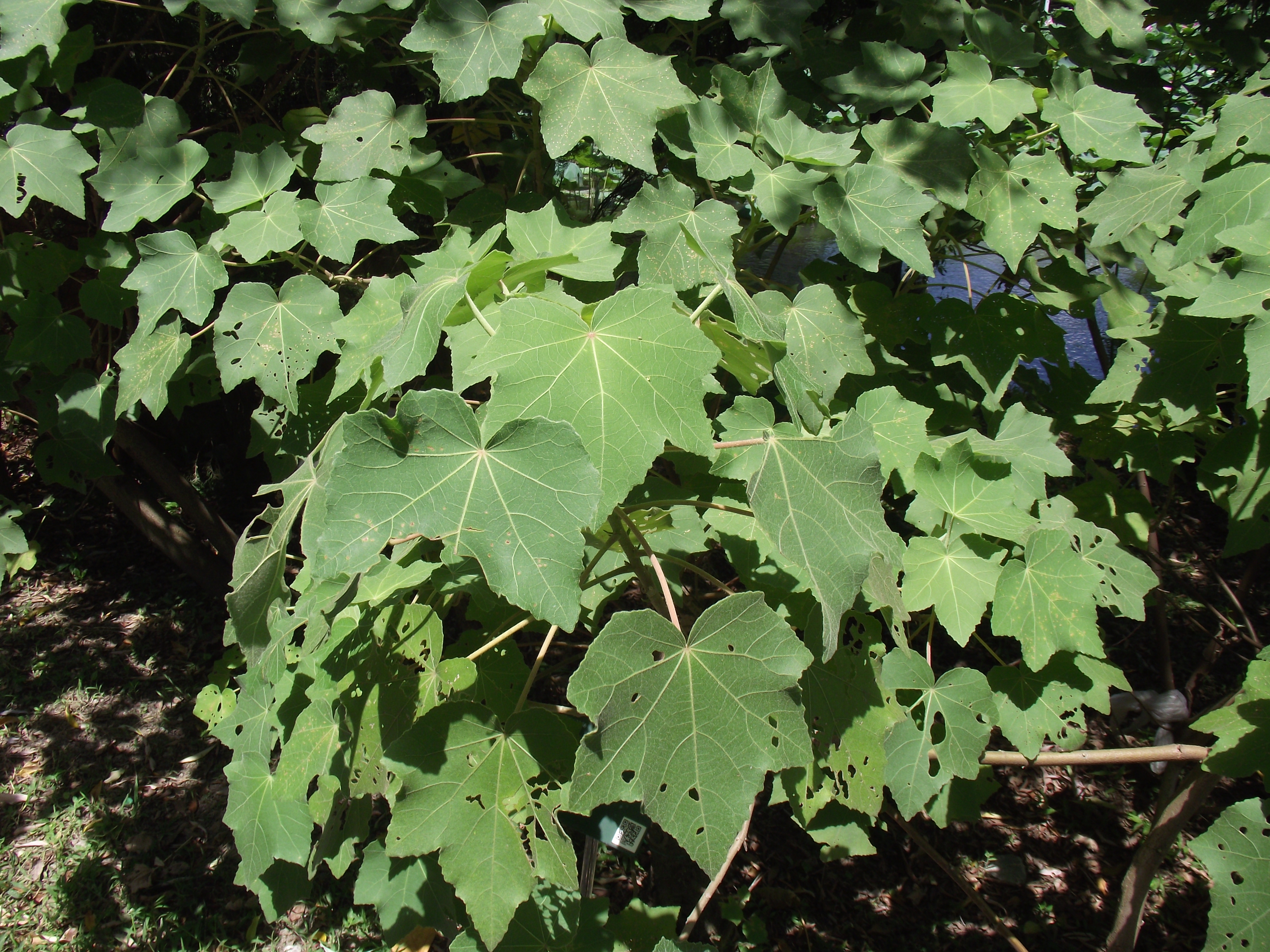
- Leaves

Scientific classification
- Kingdom: Plantae
- Clade: Embryophytes
- Clade: Tracheophytes
- Clade: Angiosperms
- Clade: Eudicots
- Clade: Rosids
- Order: Malvales
- Family: Malvaceae
- Genus: Hibiscus
- Species: H. taiwanensis

Binomial name
- Hibiscus taiwanensis S.Y.Hu

= Hibiscus taiwanensis =

Species of flowering plant

Hibiscus taiwanensis, or the Taiwan cotton rose, is a species of flowering plant in the family Malvaceae. It is a tree or shrub endemic to the Alishan Range of Taiwan. The form of flower is different from Hibiscus mutabilis in China, which is double. It can attract butterflies.

== Botany ==
Hibiscus taiwanensis can grow to 3–5 meters. The leaves are broad ovate to circular, 7–10 cm long and 6–8 cm broad; simple leaves with long petioles about 10–16 cm; arranged in alternate; subcampanulate corolla, 6–9 in diameter. Its bloom season is in August to October; fruits form in November to December. In the early morning, the flowers are white, but they turn light pink by noon and become an even deeper pink in the afternoon.

Hibiscus taiwanensis is a light-demanding plant; it needs much sunlight. It is drought-enduring and resistant to pollution and barren soil.

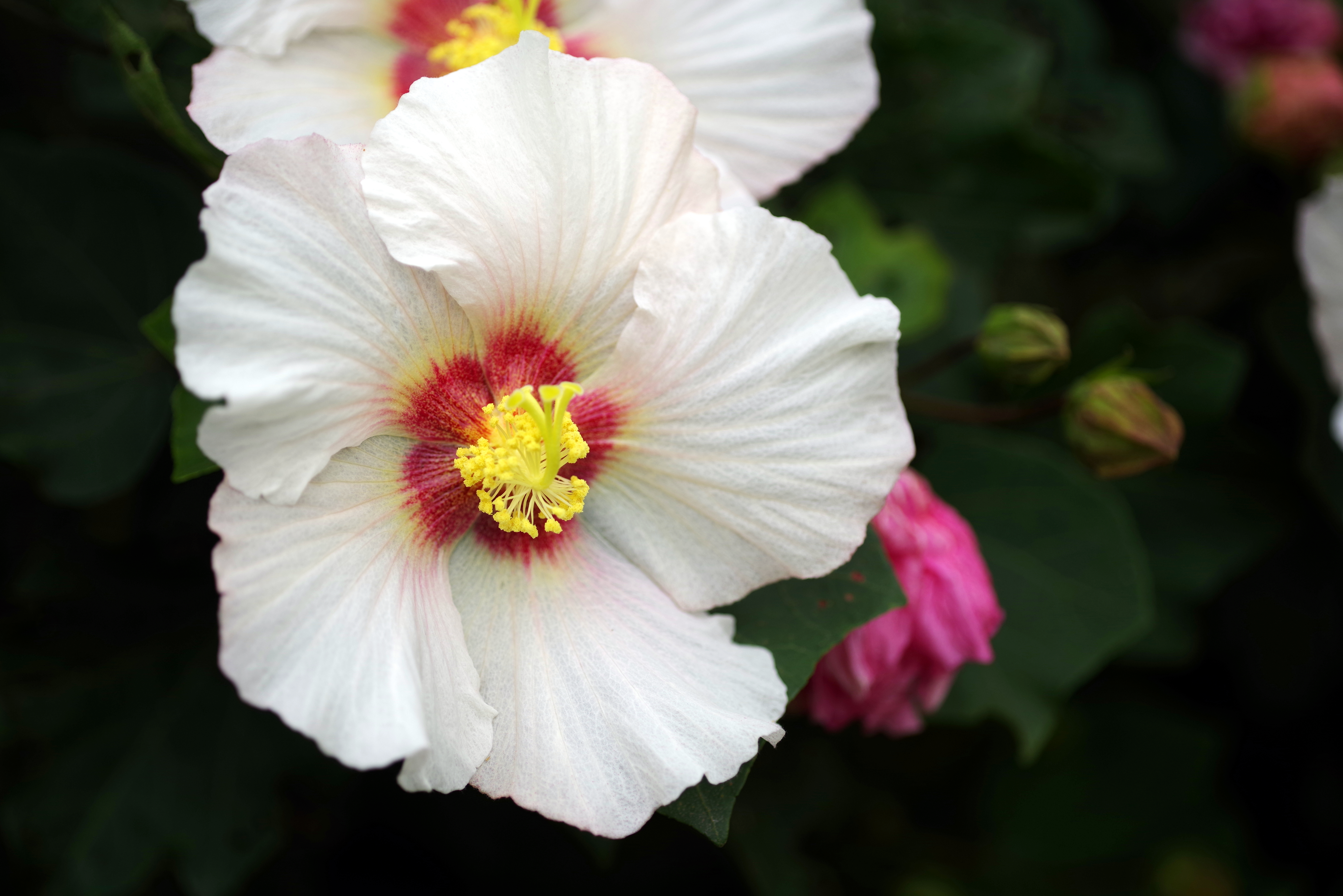
Taiwan

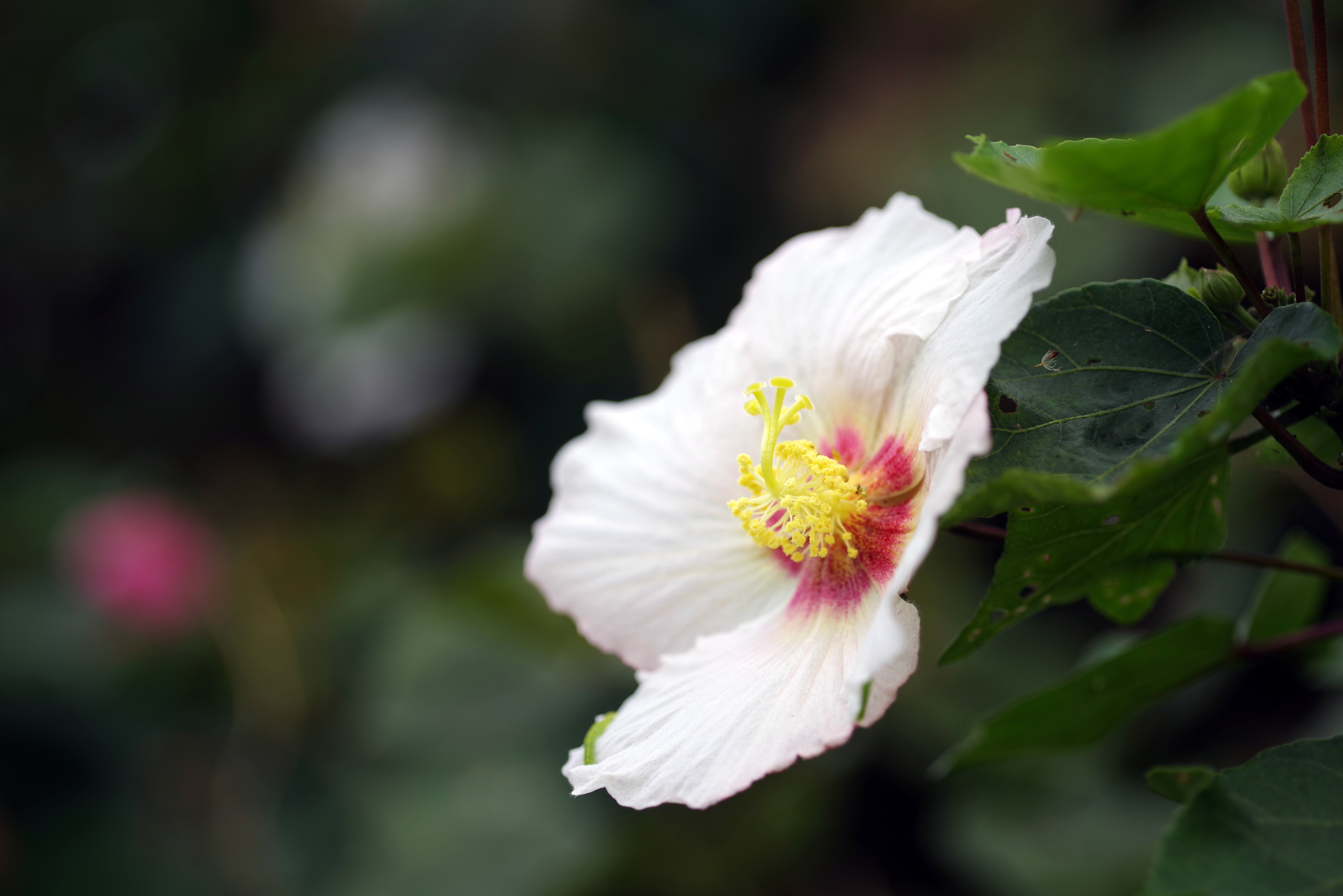
Taiwan

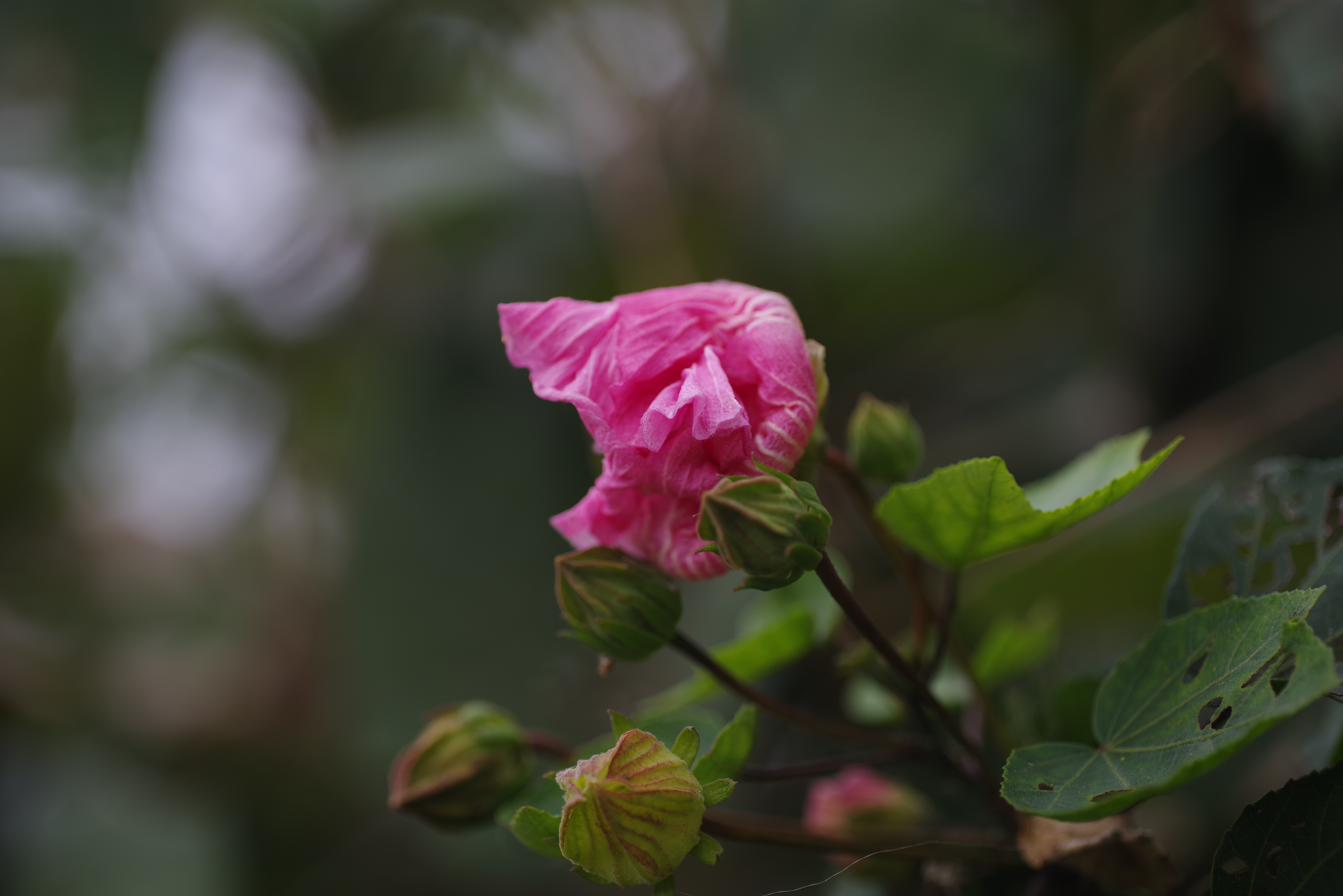
Taiwan

== Use ==
The wood of Hibiscus taiwanensis can be made into clogs.
