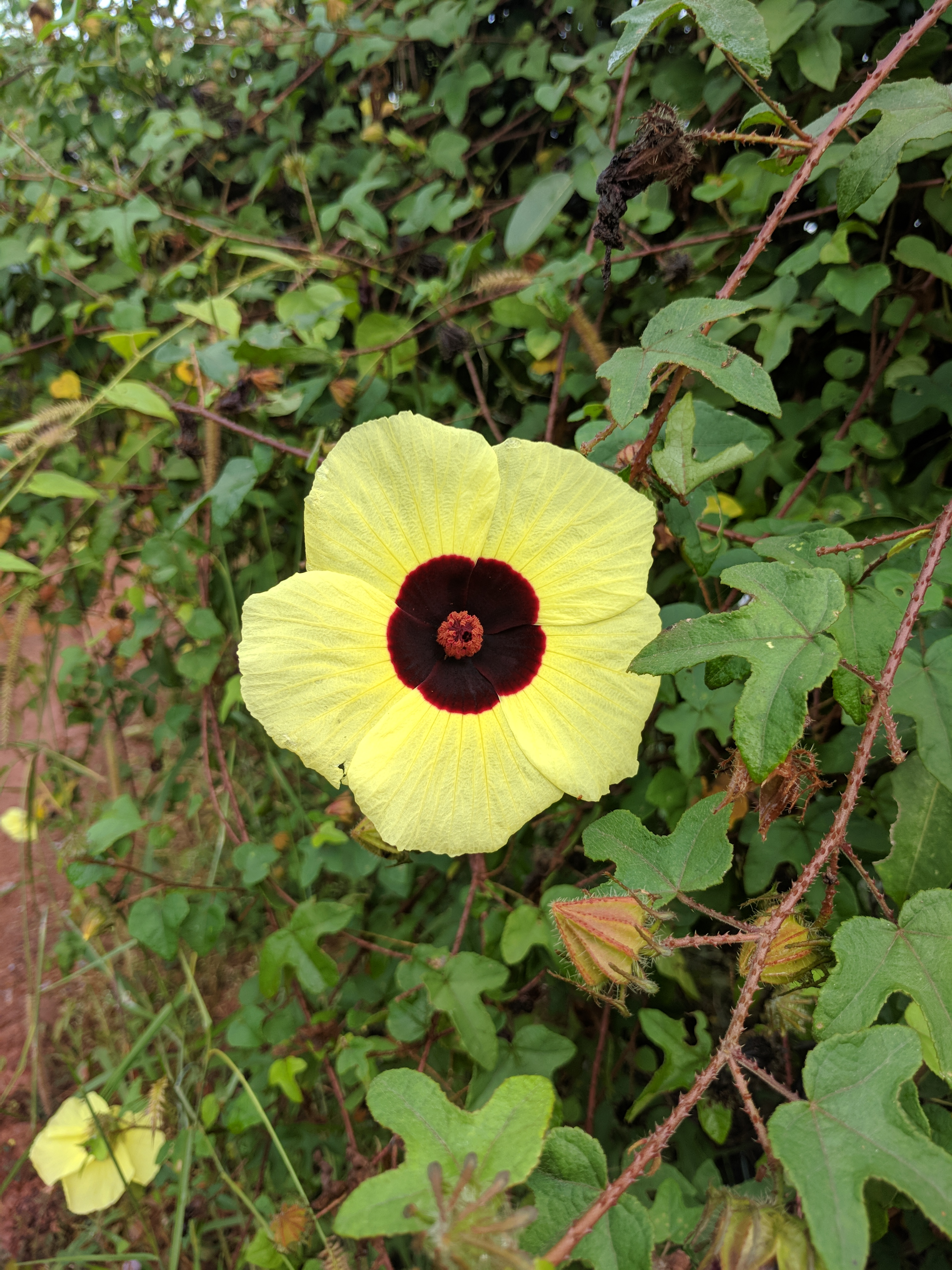

Scientific classification
- Kingdom: Plantae
- Clade: Embryophytes
- Clade: Tracheophytes
- Clade: Spermatophytes
- Clade: Angiosperms
- Clade: Eudicots
- Clade: Rosids
- Order: Malvales
- Family: Malvaceae
- Genus: Hibiscus
- Species: H. aculeatus

Binomial name
- Hibiscus aculeatus Walter

= Hibiscus aculeatus =

Species of flowering plant

Hibiscus aculeatus is a species of plant in the family Malvaceae. Common names include comfortroot and pineland hibiscus.

== Description ==
Hibiscus aculeatus is a flowering plant. Hibiscus aculeatus is described by Weakley as having harshly scabrous stems and leaves with three lobes. The flower can be identified by a dark red inner circle surrounded by a cream to white outer circle pattern on the petals. The perennial shrub is known to flower at any point from late spring to early fall. They are a member of the family Malvaceae, also known as the mallow family.

The species is pollinated by bees, especially bumblebees.

== Habitat ==
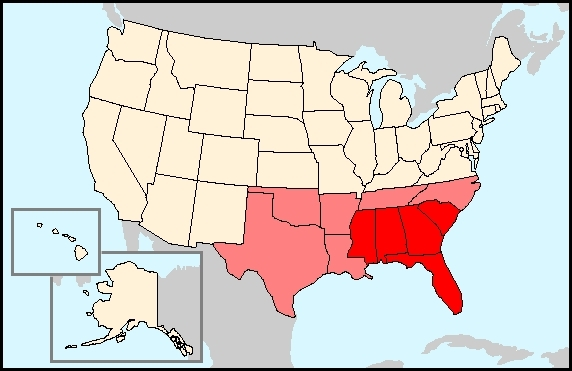
Southeast US map. Hibiscus aculeatus found in all red states (both light and dark shaded)

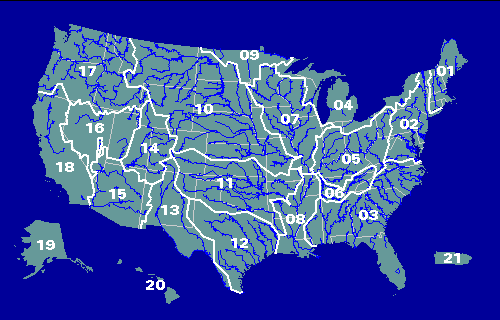
Watershed Regions

Hibiscus aculeatus is a wetland plant native to the southeastern United States from Texas to South Carolina, though, it has been introduced to Bangladesh. A map of distribution is included beneath the species box. These plants like to grow in warm, tropical and subtropical climates. The types of habitats the Hibiscus aculeatus is found in include bogs, ditches, savannahs, and hydric to mesic pine flatwoods. Natural heritage record(s) exist for Hibiscus aculeatus in the 03 watershed region (depicted in image) in the following watersheds (with watershed codes):

- Pamlico Sound (03020105)
- White Oak River (03020301)
- Lower Cape Fear (03030005)
- Lumber (03040203)

== Ecology ==
Hibiscus aculeatus is insect pollinated and is recorded to have been visited in northern Florida by Melitoma taurea, Ptilothrix bombiformis, and Svastra atripes.

== Conservation status ==
As of 1988, the species had a NatureServe status of G4G5 (secure to appearing to be secure).
