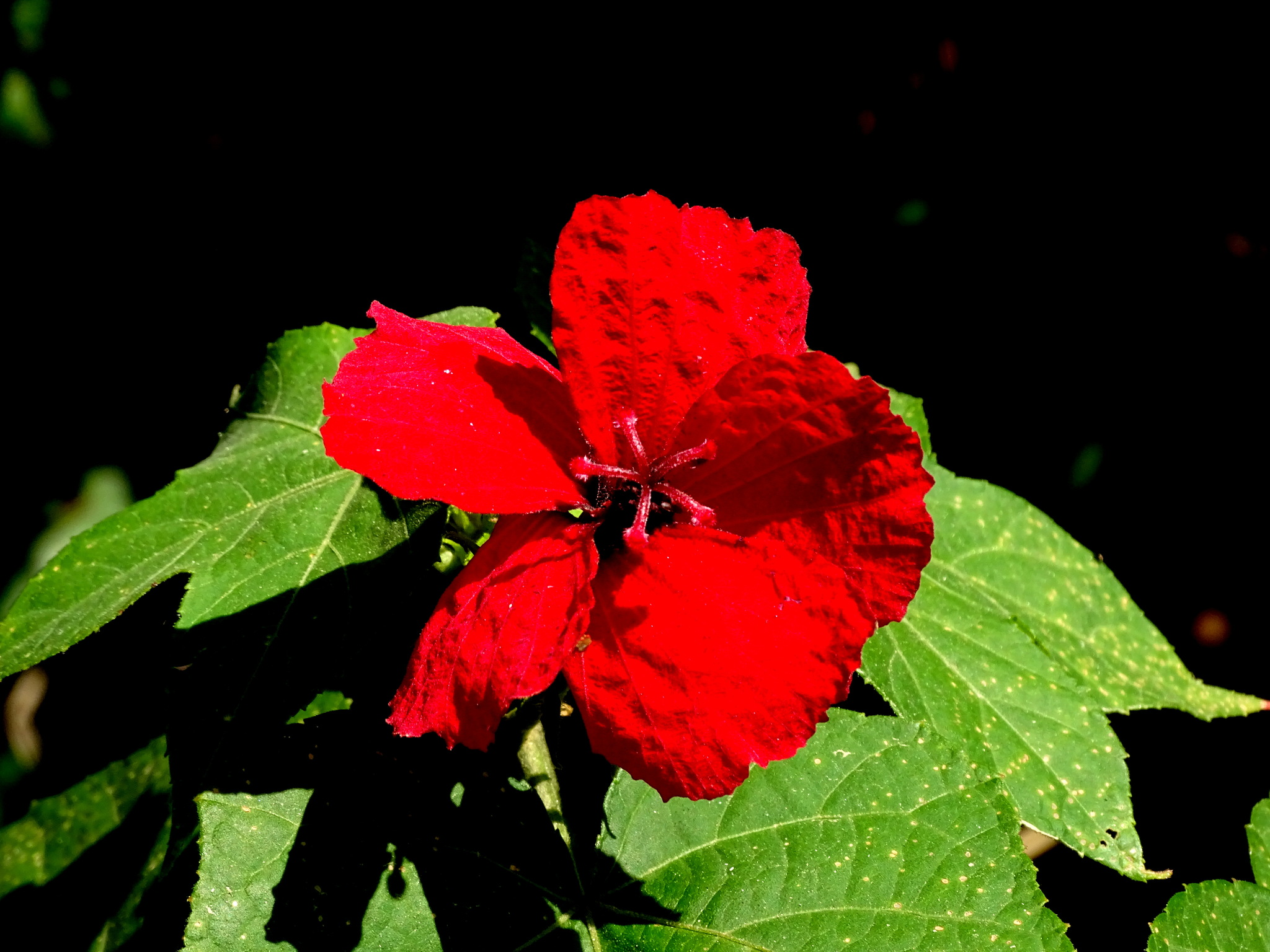

Scientific classification
- Kingdom: Plantae
- Clade: Tracheophytes
- Clade: Angiosperms
- Clade: Eudicots
- Clade: Rosids
- Order: Malvales
- Family: Malvaceae
- Genus: Hibiscus
- Species: H. uncinellus

Binomial name
- Hibiscus uncinellus Moc. & Sessé ex DC.

= Hibiscus uncinellus =

Species of plant

Hibiscus uncinellus is a species of flowering plant in the family Malvaceae, native to seasonally dry tropical areas of Mexico and Guatemala. Hibiscus uncinellus is a climbing plant, it can reach from the ground 20 m (66 ft) up into the forest.
