= Hibiscus rostellatus =

Scientific classification
- Kingdom: Plantae
- Clade: Tracheophytes
- Clade: Angiosperms
- Clade: Eudicots
- Clade: Rosids
- Order: Malvales
- Family: Malvaceae
- Genus: Hibiscus
- Species: H. rostellatus

Binomial name
- Hibiscus rostellatus Guill. & Perr.

Synonyms
- List: Abelmoschus rostellatus (Guill. & Perr.) Walp.; Hibiscus furcellatoides Hochr.; Hibiscus rostellatus var. congolanus Hauman; Hibiscus surattensis var. rostellatus (Guill. & Perr.) Hochr.

Species of plant

Hibiscus rostellatus is a species of flowering plant in the family Malvaceae, native to seasonally dry tropical Africa. Its fruit is edible, and is cooked and eaten by local peoples.
