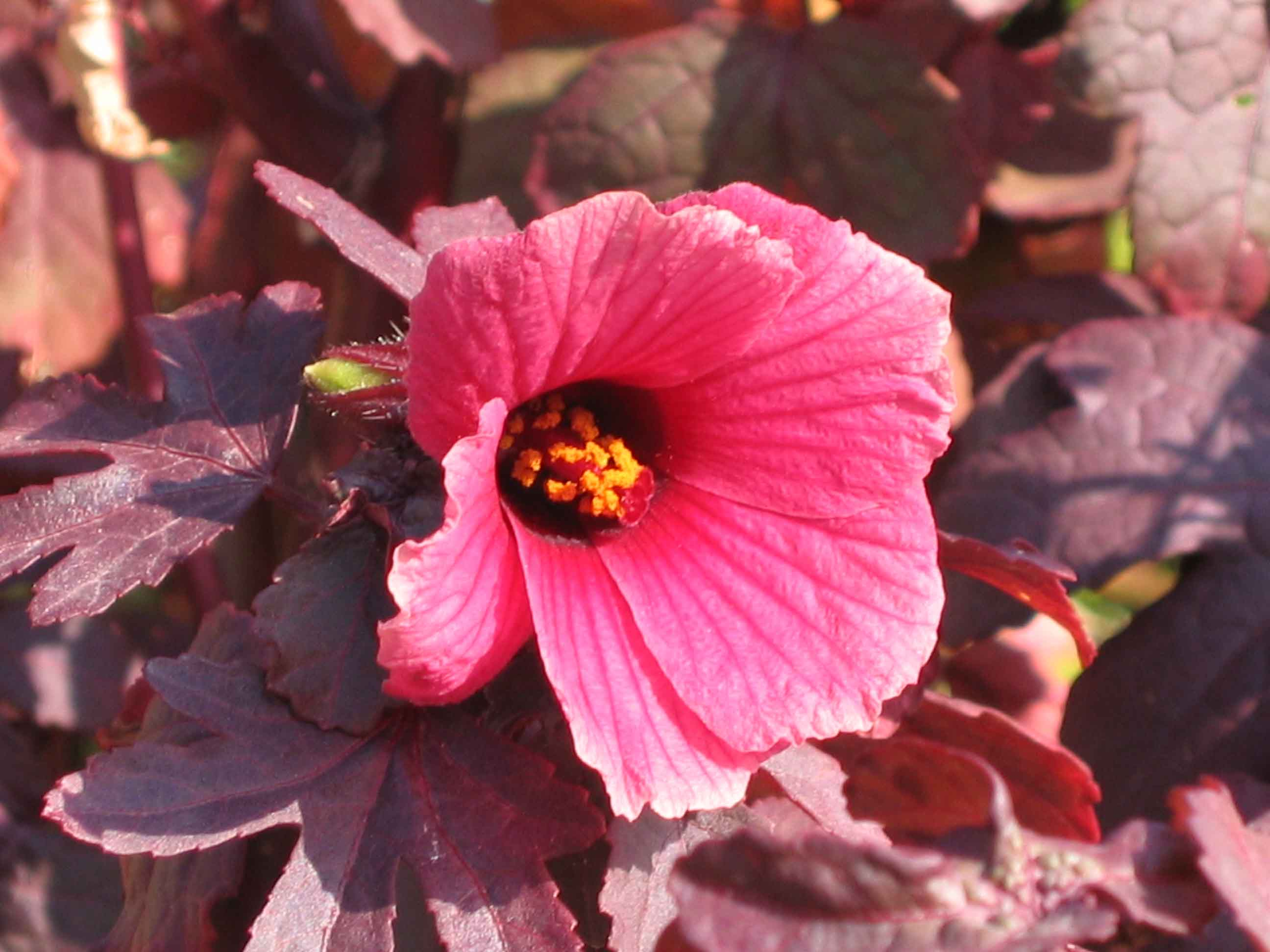

Scientific classification
- Kingdom: Plantae
- Clade: Embryophytes
- Clade: Tracheophytes
- Clade: Spermatophytes
- Clade: Angiosperms
- Clade: Eudicots
- Clade: Rosids
- Order: Malvales
- Family: Malvaceae
- Genus: Hibiscus
- Species: H. acetosella

Binomial name
- Hibiscus acetosella Welw. ex Hiern.

= Hibiscus acetosella =

Cranberry hibiscus

Species of flowering plant

Hibiscus acetosella, the cranberry hibiscus or African rosemallow, is a flowering plant of the family Malvaceae. The epithet acetosella is of Latin origin and is a diminutive of the Latin name for sorrel which comes from the sour taste experienced when eating the young leaves of both plants. Hibiscus acetosella is also known colloquially as false roselle, maroon mallow, red leaved hibiscus, and red shield hibiscus. It is one of the approximately 200–300 species that are seen in sub-tropic and tropic regions. This ornamental is usually found in abandoned fields or open areas, marshes, and forest clearings. Cranberry hibiscus is a member of a perennial group known as hardy hibiscus. In contrast to the tropical hibiscus, hardy hibiscus can tolerate colder conditions, are more vigorous, longer lasting, and have larger flowers. In colder climates, Hibiscus acetosella is easily an annual, but is often regarded as a perennial to zone 8–11. During one season, the plant can grow 90–170 cm (3.0–5.6 ft) tall and 75 cm (30 in) wide as a shrub-subshrub.

== Characteristics ==
The foliage of cranberry hibiscus is similar to that of the Japanese maple. It has dicot leaves which vary in shape from 3-5-lobed to un-lobed or undivided in the upper leaves of the plant and are generally the size of a small child's hand, about 10×10 cm. They tend to be alternate, simple, and deeply cut with crenate or jagged edges. Leaf color is observed as a dark maroon to a patchy red/green appearance. Stipules are linear, measured approximately 1.5 cm in length. Both stems and petioles (3–11 cm in length) are smooth or generally free from hair. The sepals contain 10 veins, 5 of which run to the apices of the segments; the other 5 run to the sinuses. Stems tend to be variegated. Flowers are solitary and sit atop a 1 cm long pedicel. They vary in color and are most often the dark maroon that is characteristic of the foliage with darker vein-like markings. Flowers are rarely yellow in color and are about 5 cm {2 inches} deep. Each flower contains numerous stamens at about 2 cm in length. The cranberry hibiscus is hermaphroditic and is thought to be self-pollinating. It produces seeds that are reniform and dark brown with dimensions of 3×2.5 mm.

== Taxonomy ==
Hibiscus acetosella is placed within Hibiscus section Furcaria, which is a group of approximately 100 species.

== Genetics ==
Hibiscus acetosella is an allotetraploid [2n = 4x = 72] with a genome composition of AABB. It is often used to transfer genetic resistance to root-knot nematodes with compatible Hibiscus species. Cranberry hibiscus is often grown after tomatoes and potatoes and related species of which are not resistant to nematodes

== Origin ==
Hibiscus acetosella is thought to have come about via hybridization between Hibiscus asper and Hibiscus surattensis secondary to their cultivation. It was first recognized in 1896 by French botanists as a distinct plant and given the name it currently has. The plant was probably first found growing around African villages in the southern DR Congo-Angola-Zambia region. The crop was brought to Brazil and South-East Asia where it was most likely used as sustenance for enslaved Africans. It is now considered more popular in Brazil than its original location in Africa, where it is now regularly cultivated and eaten as a spinach-like green.

== Living conditions ==
Cranberry hibiscus is cultivated in medium altitudes in areas of high rainfall although it does do fairly well in droughts. It requires moist soil with good drainage and a range of partial shade to full sun exposure. The plant does well in slightly acidic conditions with a soil pH between 6.1 and 6.5. Cranberry hibiscus tends to flower late in season when days are shorter. Flowers open for a few hours during the late fall to early winter at midday. Although the plant itself remains in bloom for a few weeks, once open, a flower remains so for just one day. Plants typically succumb to cold weather in the Midwest prior to flowers appearing

== Growing at home ==
Seeds germinate easily within 3–4 days in a container but tend to grow rapidly. Light is not required for germination. Cranberry hibiscus propagates well with cuttings, which will take root in soil or water. The plant can be maintained in an oval form by pinching or cutting it back during the summer. Otherwise, it will have one dominant stem.

== Edible properties ==
Cranberry hibiscus is mostly known for its slightly sour to pleasantly tart-tasting young leaves, which are commonly used as a vegetable, either raw or cooked. In South America, the leaves are used, sparingly, in salads and stir-fries. Leaves are eaten in small quantities, however, due to acid content and because they are mucilaginous. Cranberry hibiscus leaves also contribute to the décor of various dishes as they retain their color after being cooked.

The flowers are used to make teas or other drinks, in which they contribute a deep color, and possible mild medicinal benefits, rather than taste. In Central America, the flowers are combined with ice, sugar, lemon or lime juice, and water to make a purple lemonade.

The root is edible, however, it is thought of as fibrous and distasteful. Contrary to similar species, such as the Hibiscus sabdariffa (commonly used to make the beverage jamaica), the calyx (or sepals) of H. acetosella is non-fleshy and not eaten. In Angola, a tea made from the leaves of cranberry hibiscus is used as a post-fever tonic and to treat anemia. The plant is also utilized to treat myalgias, by crushing leaves into cold water, and for bathing children. The plant is thought to contain polyphenols, compounds that may combat inflammation and that are commonly used to treat inflammatory diseases.

== Gallery ==
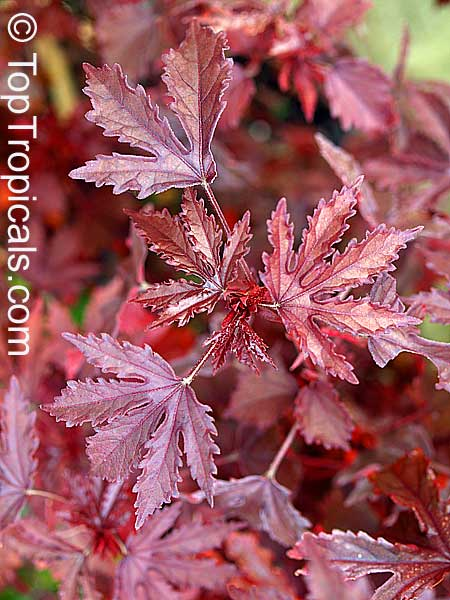
H. acetosella leaves

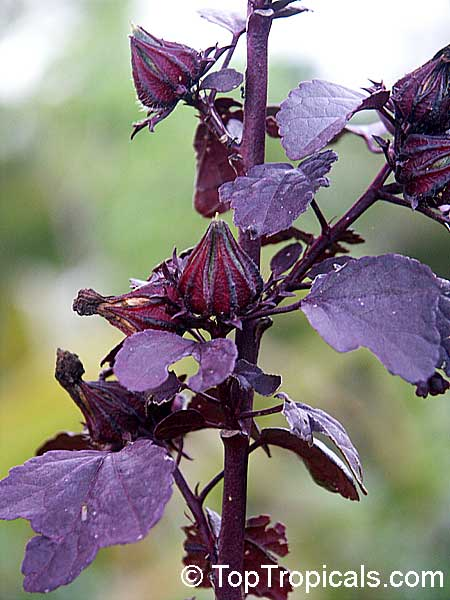
H. acetosella budding

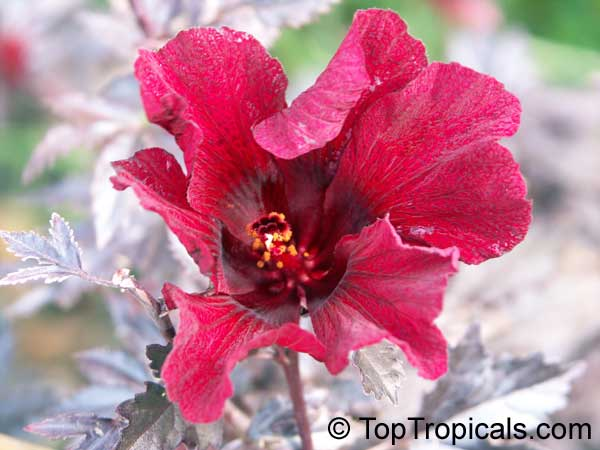
H. acetosella flower

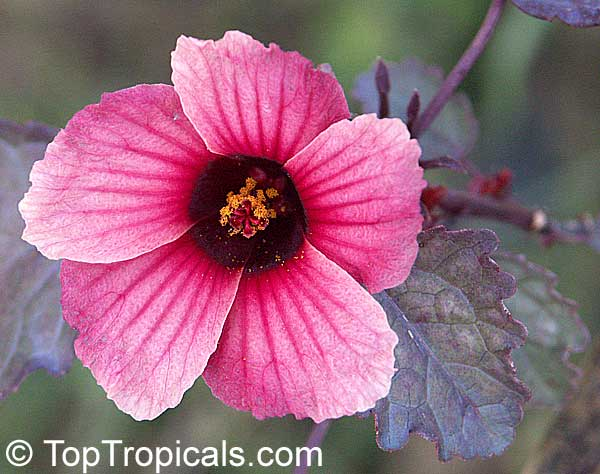
H. acetosella full bloom

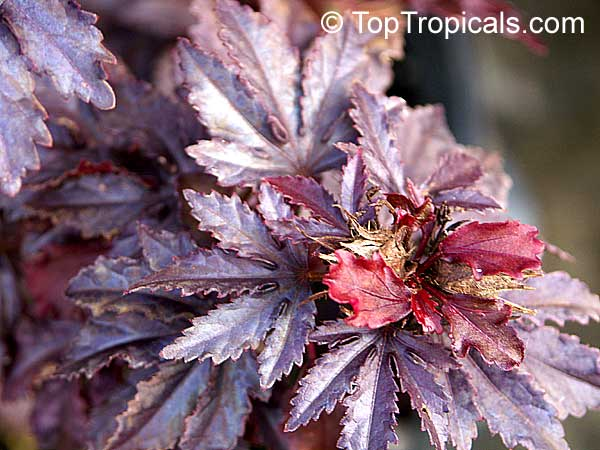
H. acetosella close up

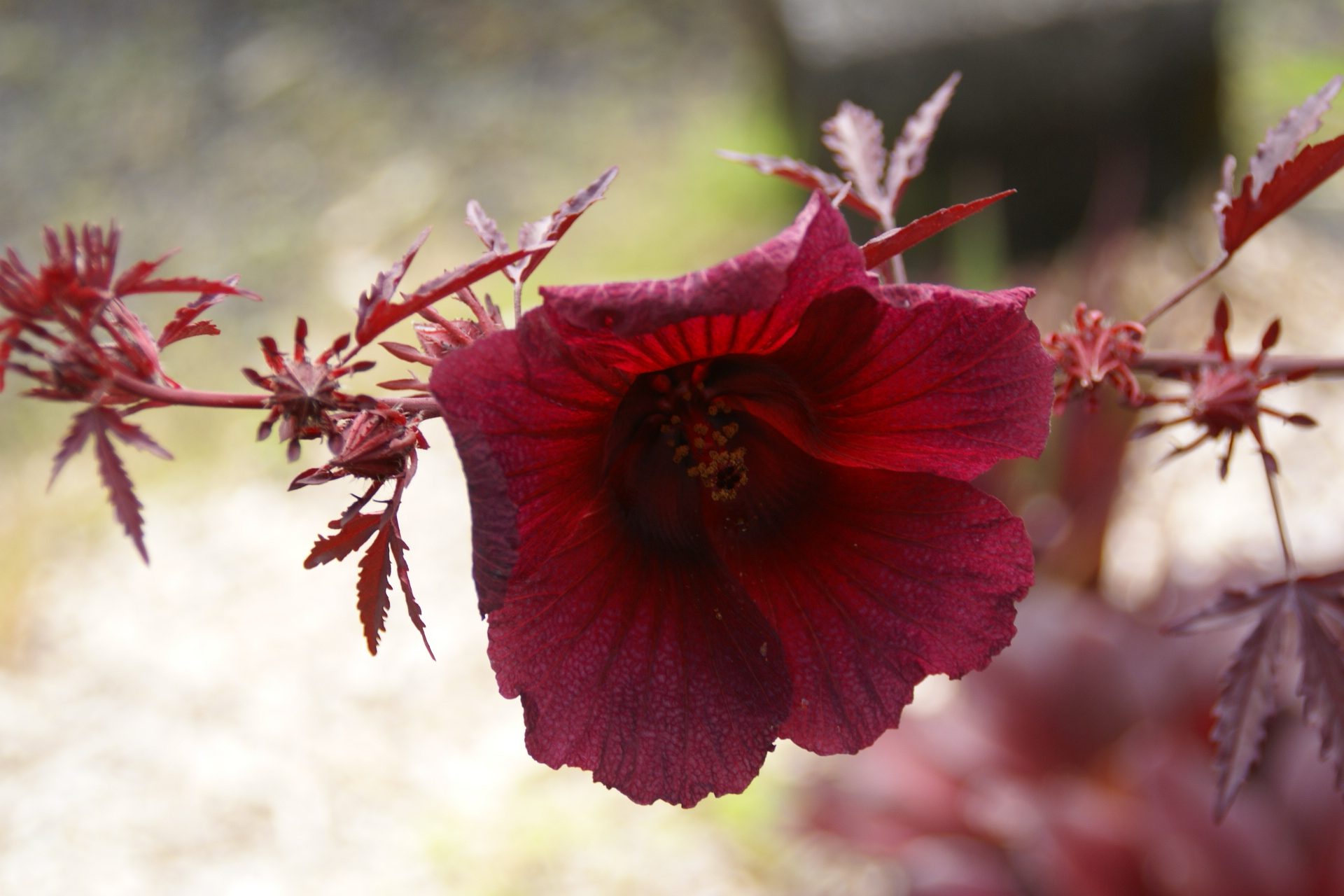
Photographed in Hilo, Hawaii
