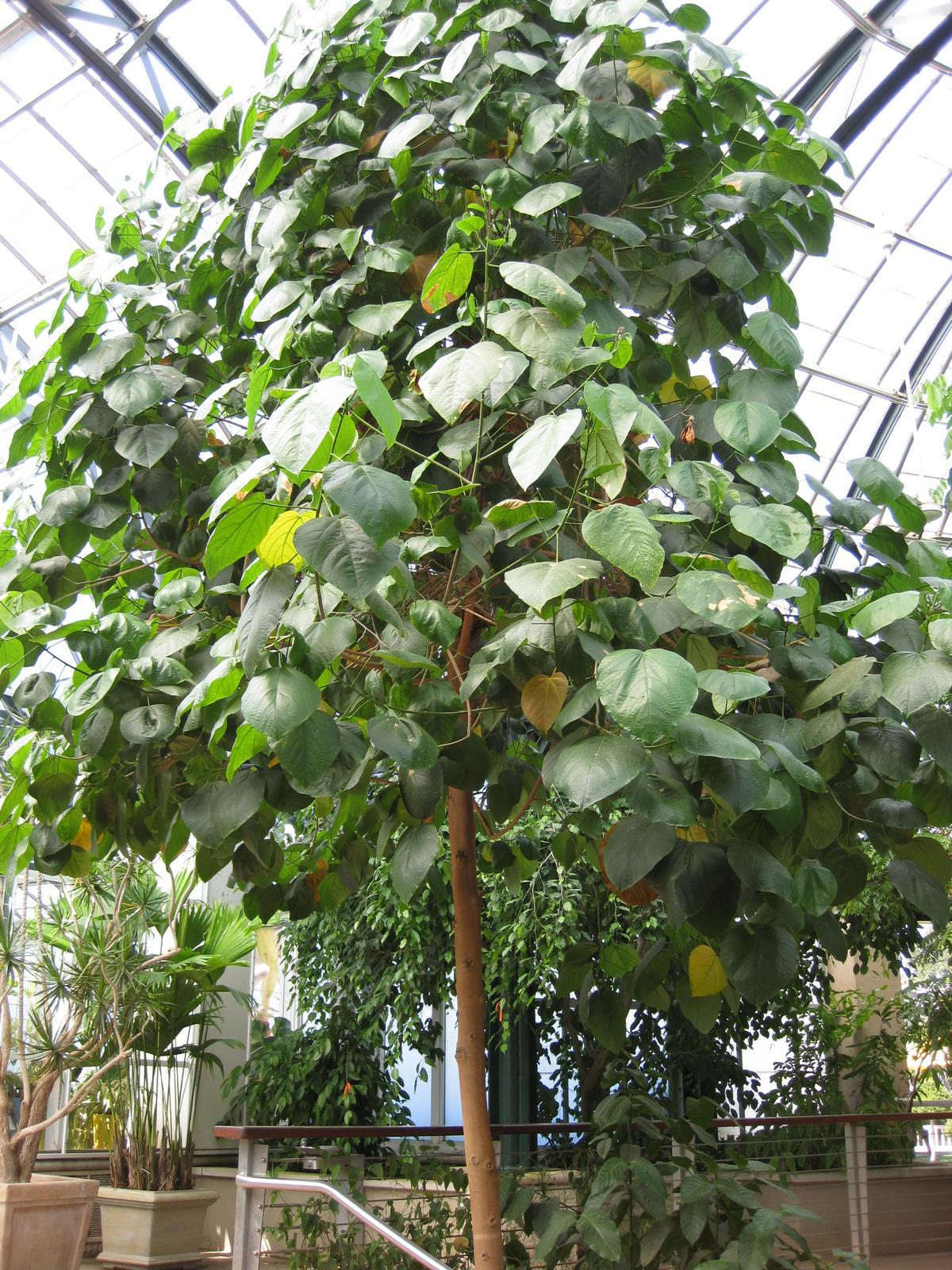

Scientific classification
- Kingdom: Plantae
- Clade: Tracheophytes
- Clade: Angiosperms
- Clade: Eudicots
- Clade: Rosids
- Order: Malvales
- Family: Malvaceae
- Genus: Hibiscus
- Species: H. archboldianus

Binomial name
- Hibiscus archboldianus Borss.Waalk.

Synonyms
- Talipariti archboldianum (Borss.Waalk.) Fryxell; Hibiscus lepidotus Borss.Waalk.; Hibiscus womersleyanus Borss.Waalk.

= Hibiscus archboldianus =

Species of tree

Hibiscus archboldianus is a species of Hibiscus. It is a tree, which when mature has a height of anywhere between 8–50 metres (26–164 ft) tall, and primarily harvested for its fibre. It inhabits New Guinea.
