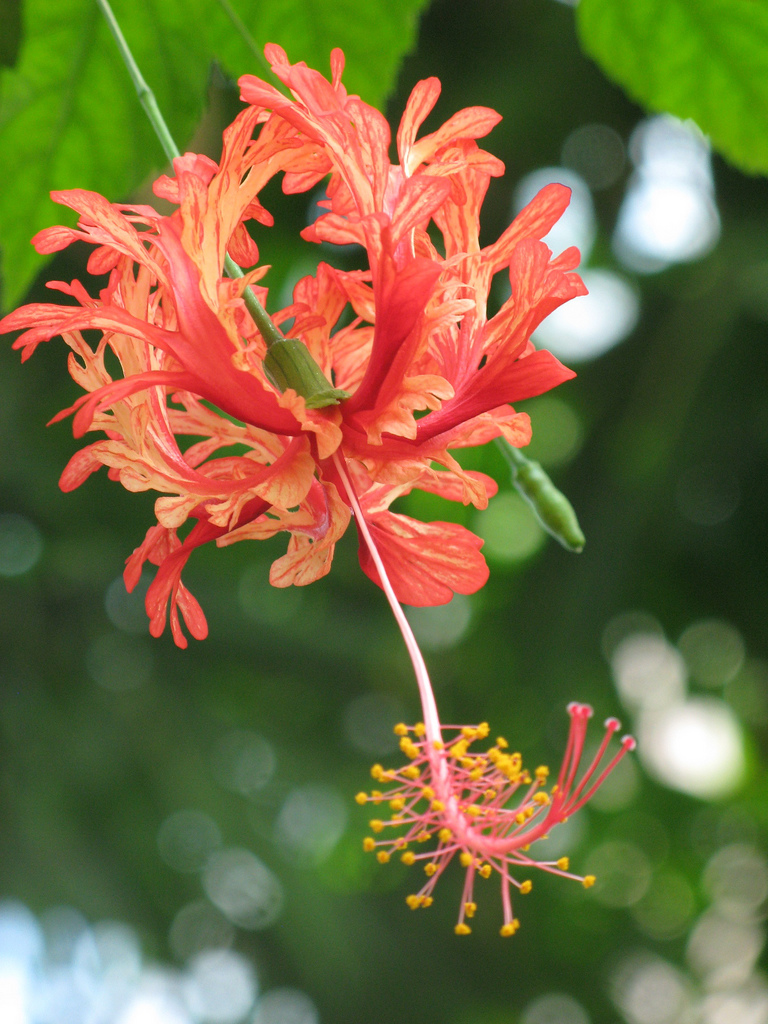

Scientific classification
- Kingdom: Plantae
- Clade: Embryophytes
- Clade: Tracheophytes
- Clade: Angiosperms
- Clade: Eudicots
- Clade: Rosids
- Order: Malvales
- Family: Malvaceae
- Genus: Hibiscus
- Species: H. schizopetalus

Binomial name
- Hibiscus schizopetalus (Dyer) Hook.f.

= Hibiscus schizopetalus =

Species of flowering plant

Hibiscus schizopetalus is a species of Hibiscus native to tropical eastern Africa in Kenya, Tanzania and Mozambique. Its common names include fringed rosemallow, Japanese lantern, coral hibiscus, and spider hibiscus.

== Description ==
Hibiscus schizopetalus is a shrub growing to 3 metres (9.8 ft) tall.

The red or pink flowers are very distinctive in their frilly, finely divided petals. Flowers with finely dissected petal have a range of colours, the most common being the red form (Keena et al., 2002; Ng, 2006). Leaves resemble those of H. rosa-sinensis.

The major anthocyanin found in flowers of H. schizopetalus is cyanidin-3-sambusophoroside (Lowry, 1976). From leaves, two new triterpene esters have been isolated (Jose & Vijayan, 2006).

== Uses ==
=== Cultivation ===
Hibiscus schizopetalus is cultivated as an ornamental plant, for use in tropical and subtropical gardens. In temperate climates it does not tolerate temperatures below 10 °C (50 °F) (RHS hardiness rating H1B); but can be placed outside during the summer months, in a sheltered spot with full sun, in alkaline or neutral soil. It has received the Royal Horticultural Society's Award of Garden Merit.

== Gallery ==
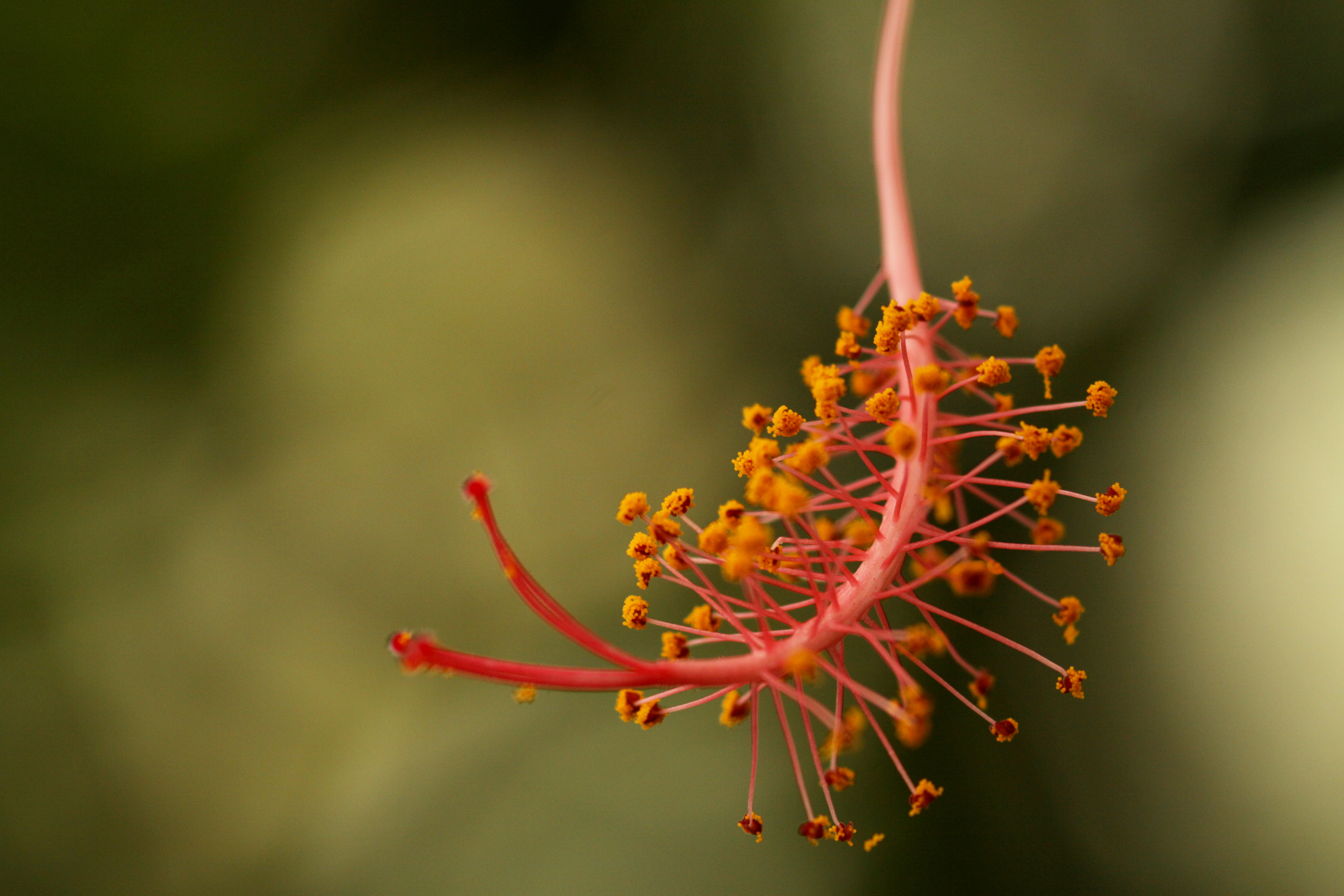

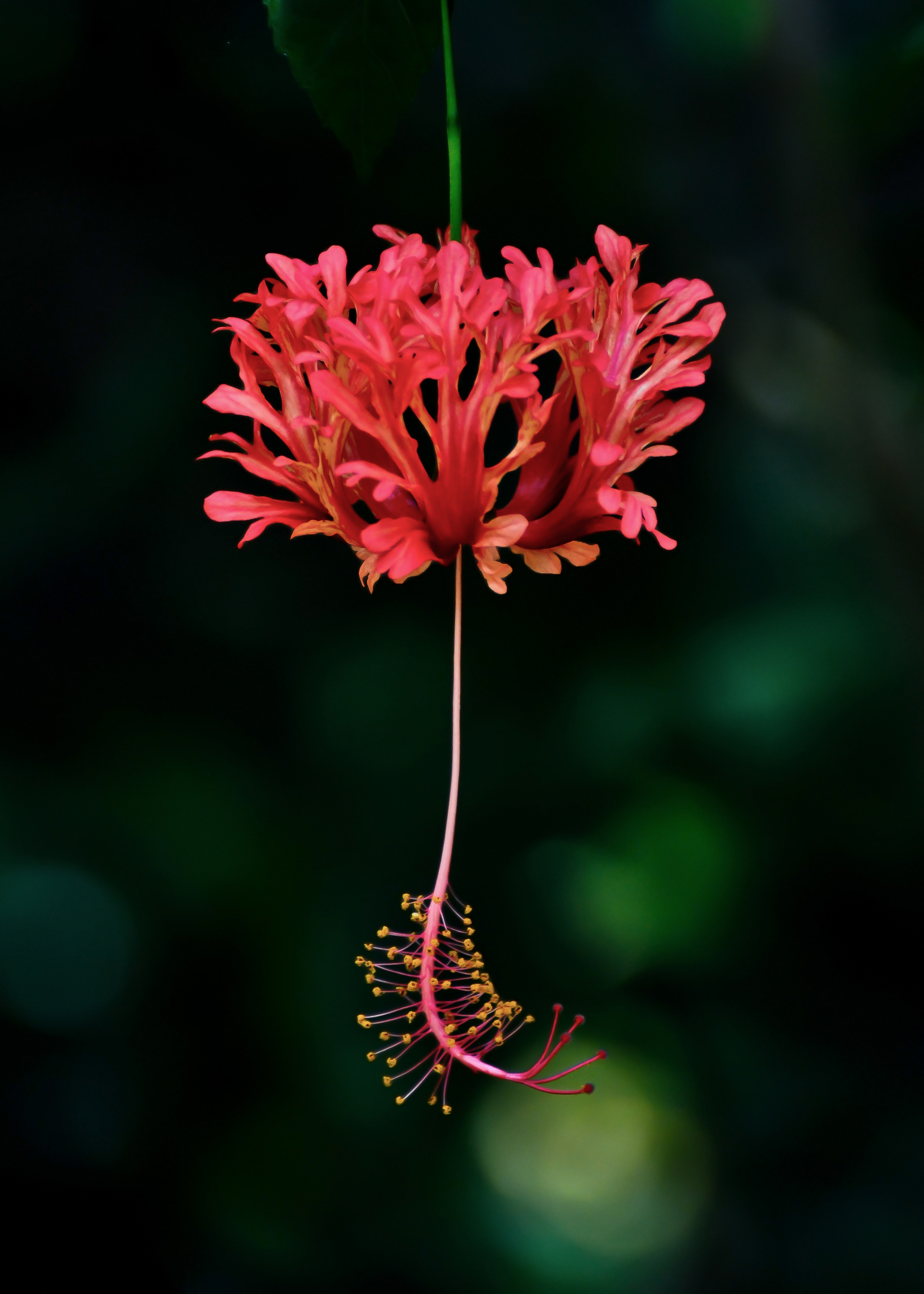

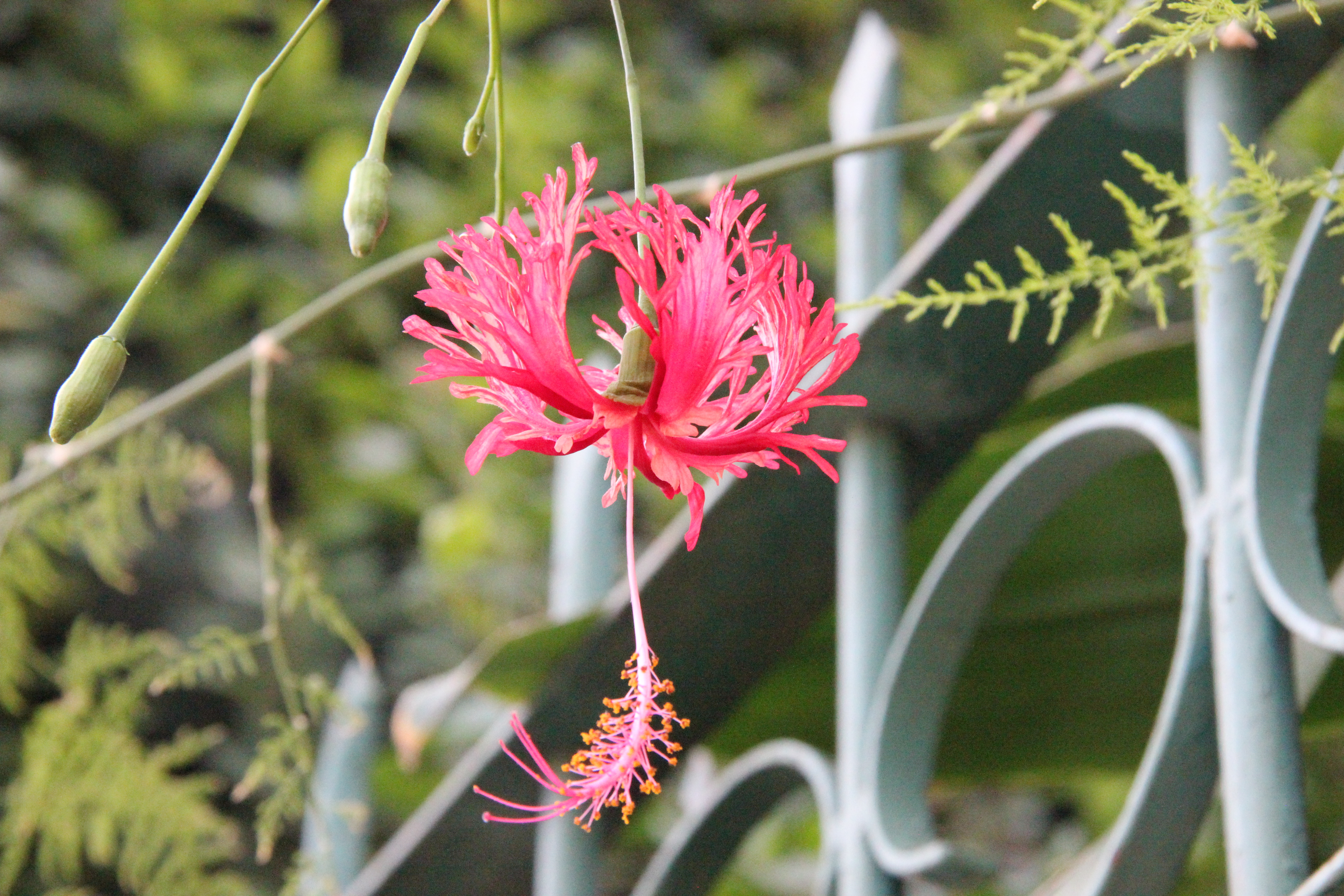
