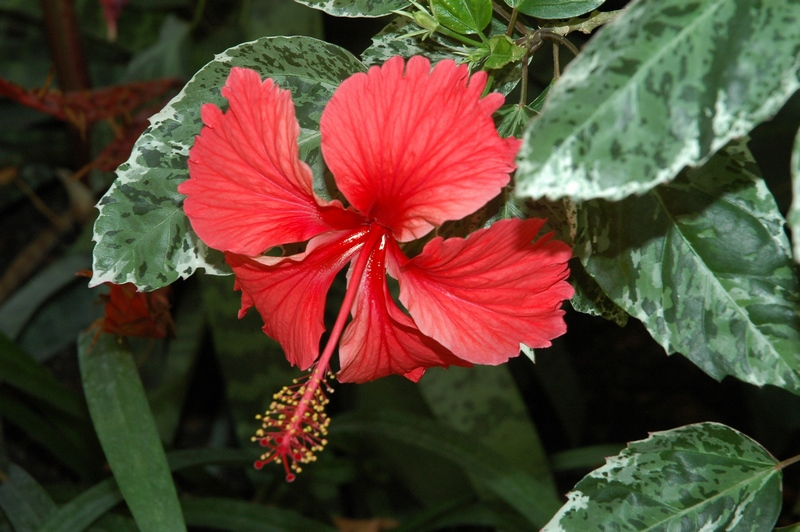

Scientific classification
- Kingdom: Plantae
- Clade: Tracheophytes
- Clade: Angiosperms
- Clade: Eudicots
- Clade: Rosids
- Order: Malvales
- Family: Malvaceae
- Genus: Hibiscus
- Species: H. cooperi

Binomial name
- Hibiscus cooperi J.Veitch f.

= Hibiscus cooperi =

Species of plant

Hibiscus cooperi is a species of flowering plant in the family Malvaceae, native to Vanuatu. It was first formally described in 1863. It is one of the parents of the widely cultivated Hibiscus × rosa-sinensis, the other being Hibiscus kaute.
