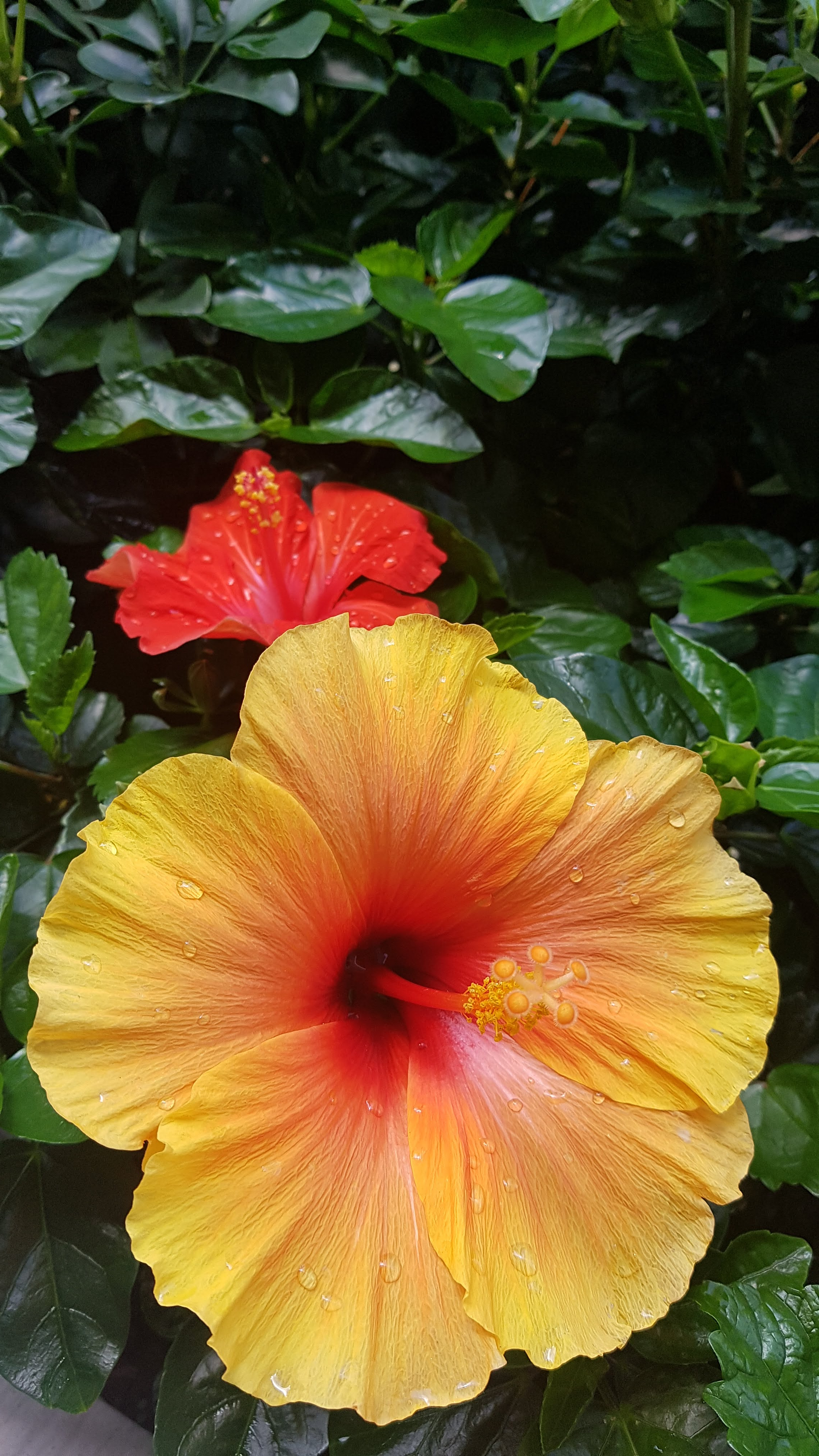

Scientific classification
- Kingdom: Plantae
- Clade: Tracheophytes
- Clade: Angiosperms
- Clade: Eudicots
- Clade: Rosids
- Order: Malvales
- Family: Malvaceae
- Genus: Hibiscus
- Species: H. kaute

Binomial name
- Hibiscus kaute L.A.J.Thomson & Butaud

= Hibiscus kaute =

Species of plant

Hibiscus kaute is a species of flowering plant in the family Malvaceae, first described as a distinct species in 2022. It was initially recorded in the wild in Tahiti in the 1850s and may also be native to the Marquesas Islands, both part of French Polynesia. It is one of the parent species of the widely cultivated Hibiscus × rosa-sinensis, the other being Hibiscus cooperi.
