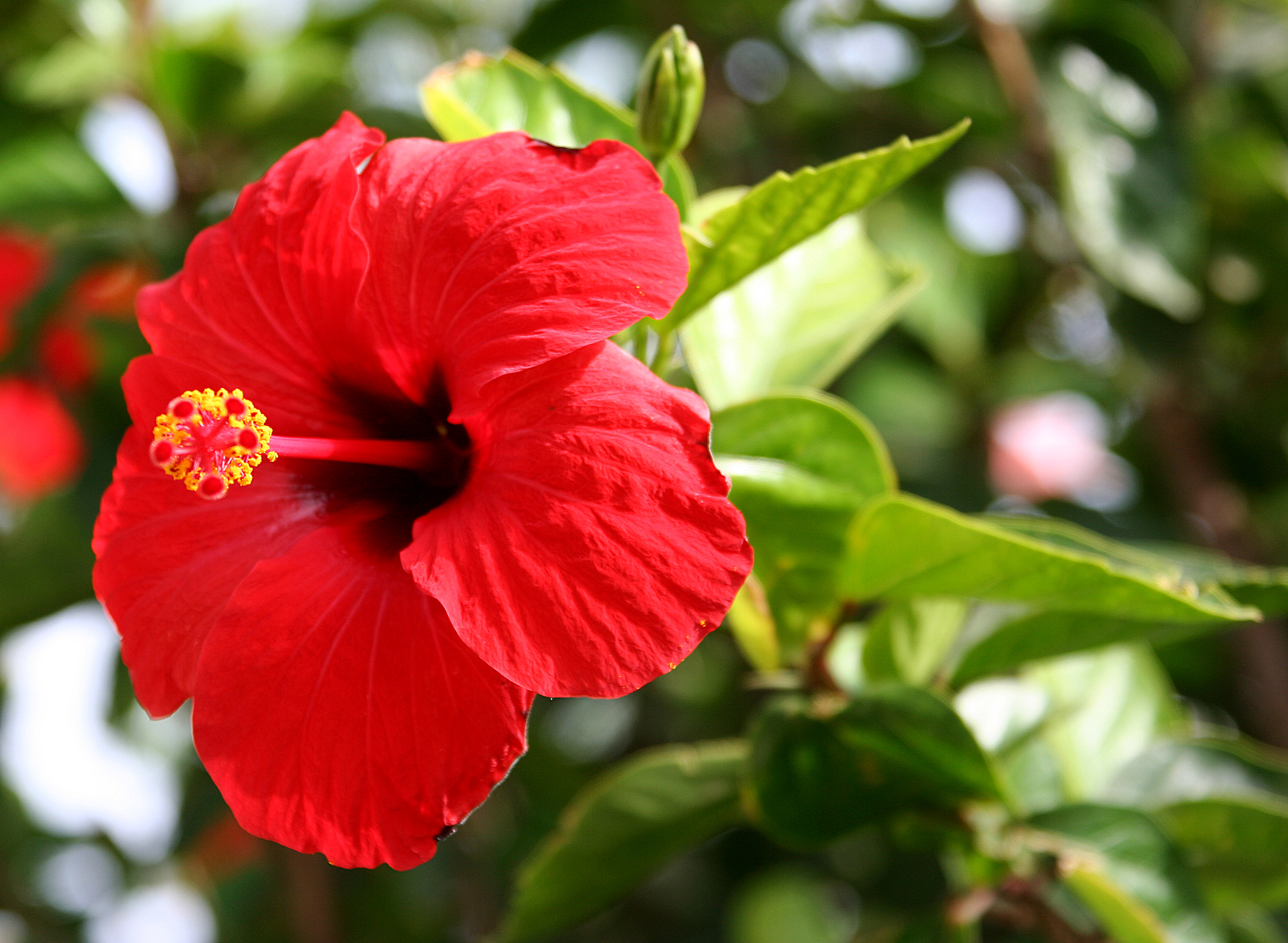

Scientific classification
- Kingdom: Plantae
- Clade: Tracheophytes
- Clade: Angiosperms
- Clade: Eudicots
- Clade: Rosids
- Order: Malvales
- Family: Malvaceae
- Subfamily: Malvoideae
- Tribe: Hibisceae
- Genus: Hibiscus
- Species: H. × rosa-sinensis

Binomial name
- Hibiscus × rosa-sinensis L.

Synonyms
- Hibiscus arnotti Griff. ex Mast.; Hibiscus cooperi auct.; Hibiscus festalis Salisb.; Hibiscus rosiflorus Stokes; Hibiscus storckii Seem.; Hibiscus tricolo Dehnh.

= Hibiscus × rosa-sinensis =

Hybrid species of flowering plant

Hibiscus × rosa-sinensis (known colloquially as Chinese hibiscus, China rose, (Note: This name also refers to Rosa chinensis, a true rose.) Hawaiian hibiscus, rose mallow and shoeblack plant) is a cultigen of tropical hibiscus, a flowering plant in the Hibiscus genus and Hibisceae tribe of the family Malvaceae.

It is an artificial hybrid created in cultivation during the pre-Columbian era by Polynesians in the west Pacific from the species Hibiscus cooperi and H. kaute (native to Vanuatu and French Polynesia, respectively). It is widely cultivated as an ornamental plant in the tropics and subtropics. The hibiscus is the national flower of Malaysia, where it holds official status, and is also considered the unofficial national flower of Haiti.

== Description ==
=== Tree and leaves ===
Hibiscus × rosa-sinensis is a bushy, evergreen shrub or small tree growing 2.5–5 m (8–16 ft) tall and 1.5–3 m (5–10 ft) wide. The plant has a branched taproot. Its stem is aerial, erect, bark is light-grey, green easy to peel and smooth cylindrical, and branched.

Its leaves are simple and petiolate, with alternate phyllotaxy. The leaf shape is ovate while the tip is acute, and the margin is serrated. Venation is unicostate reticulate, meaning the leaves' veins are branched or divergent. Their surfaces are glossy. Free lateral stipules are present.

=== Flowers ===
Its flowers bloom in summer and autumn. They are solitary (axillary) and symmetrical. They are typically red, with five petals 10 cm (4 in) in diameter, with prominent orange-tipped red anthers. Cultivars and hybrids have flowers in a variety of colors as well as red: white, pink, orange, peach, yellow, blue, and purple. Some plants have double flowers.

At the bottom of every bud is the calyx, which is green in color. The pointed ends of the calyx are called the sepals. When the flower begins to bloom, the petals begin to grow.

Each flower has both male and female parts. The ovary and other female parts of the flower lie in its main structure: the pistil, which is long and tubular. The five "hairy" spots at the top of the pistil make up the stigma, which is where pollen is collected. In the middle of the pistil is the style, which is the tube down which pollen travels to the ovary. The ovary lies at the bottom of the blossom; each flower has only one superior ovary. The male part of the flower, called the stamen, consists of stem-like filaments and anthers. Each filament ends with the pollen-producing anther.

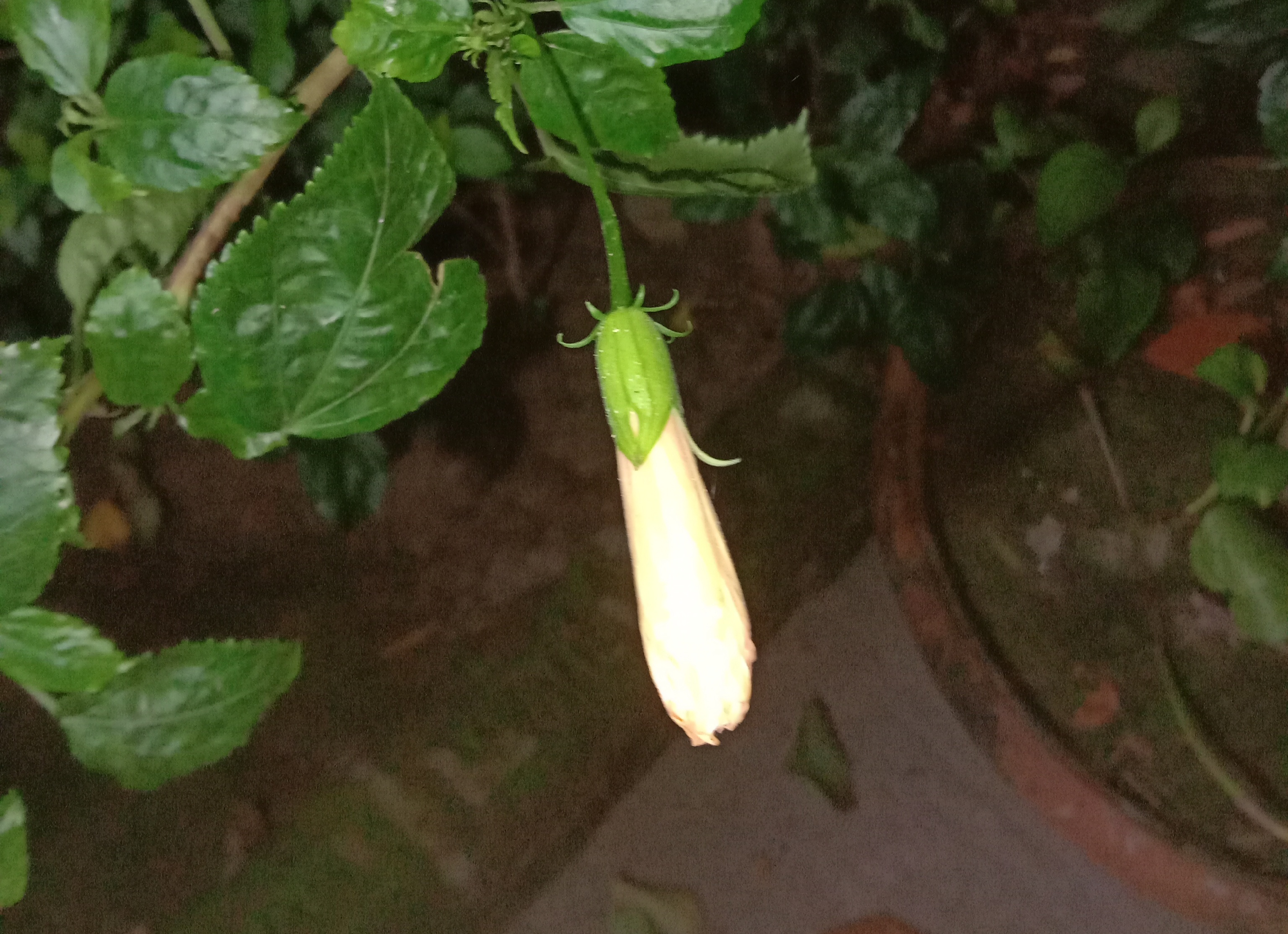
White-coloured flower bud at night

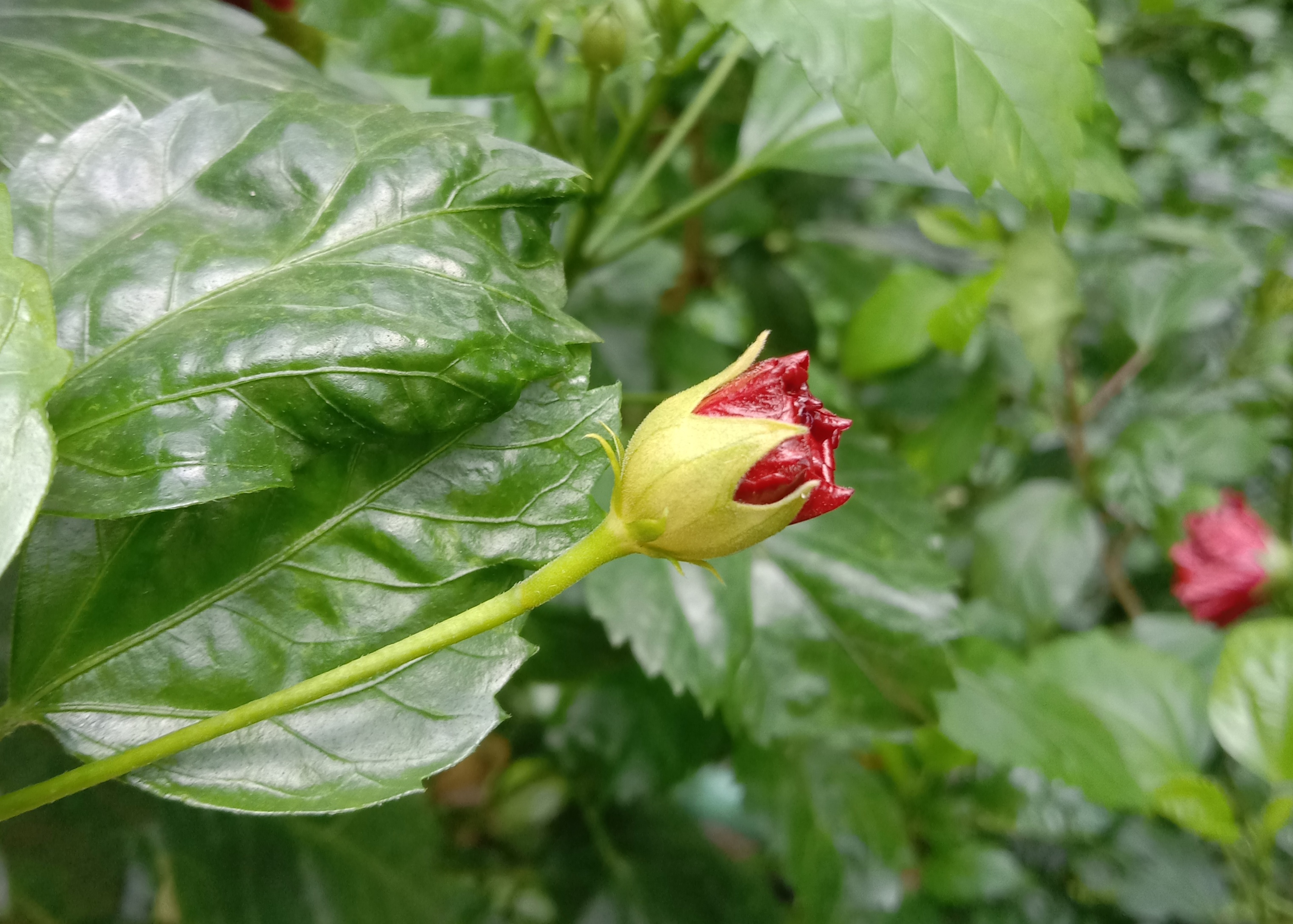
Bud captured at noon in West Bengal

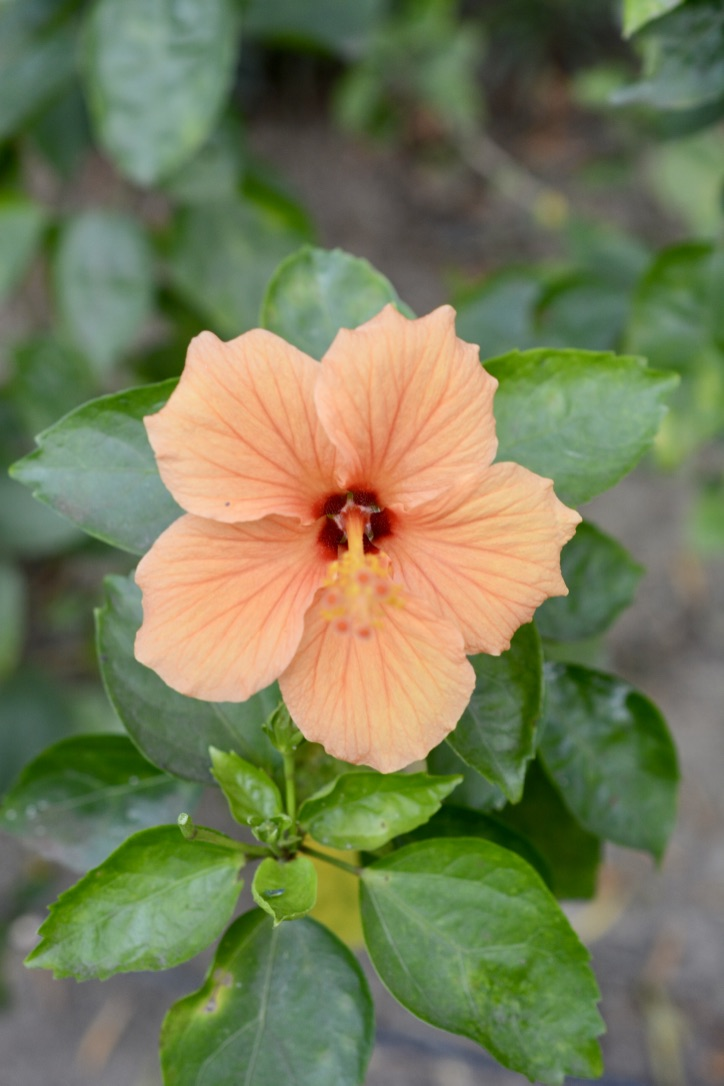
Orangish flower

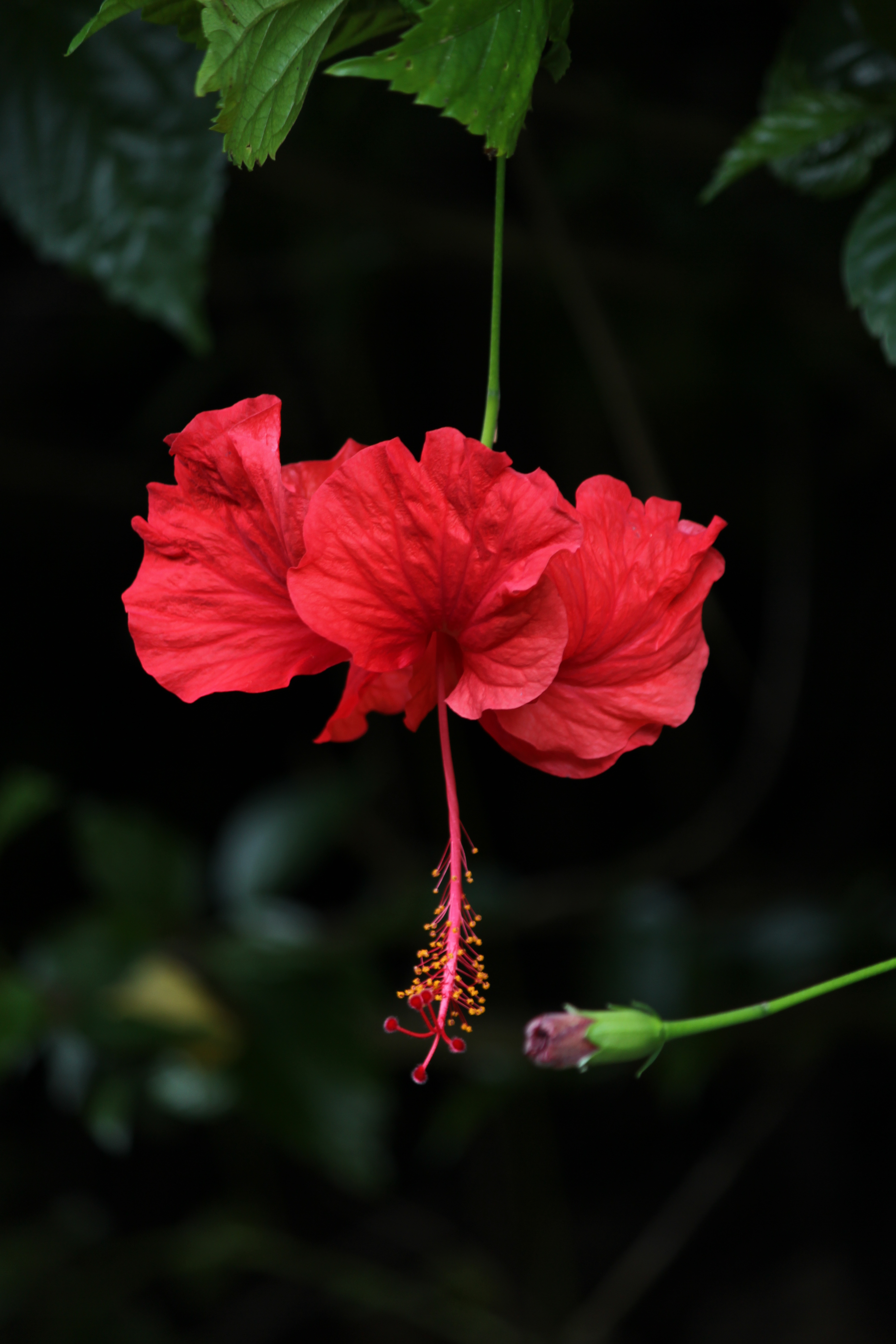
Flower and bud

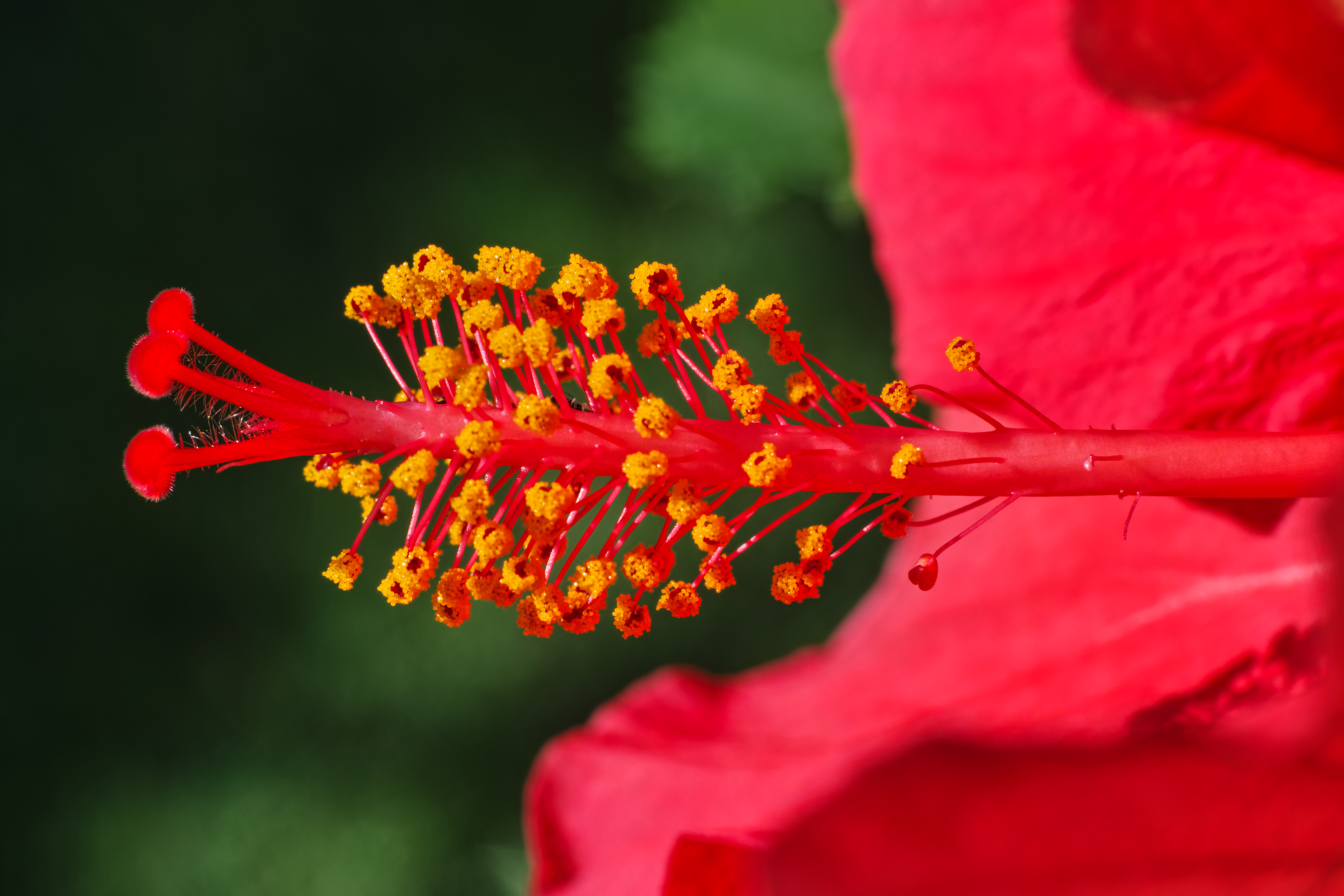
The filaments of the stamens of the flower are partly fused into a staminal tube that surrounds the style.

== Taxonomy ==
Hibiscus × rosa-sinensis was first described as a species in 1753 by Carl Linnaeus in Species Plantarum. His description was based on specimens with double bright red flowers in cultivation in the Indian subcontinent and Indonesia. The specific epithet rosa-sinensis literally means "rose of China", although the plant is not closely related to true roses, nor is it from China. The genus Hibiscus is in the tribe Hibisceae and the subfamily Malvoideae of the family Malvaceae. In parts of the Southeastern U.S., the Hibiscus mutabilis colloquially known as the Confederate rose, despite not being native nor a rose.

=== Genetics ===
Hibiscus × rosa-sinensis is one of many plants with a genetic characteristic known as polyploidy, a condition in which there are more than two complete sets of chromosomes. A result of polyploidy is that the phenotype of a plant's offspring may be quite different from the parent plant, or indeed any ancestor, essentially allowing possibly random expression of any (or all) of the characteristics of previous generations. Because of this characteristic, H. × rosa-sinensis has become popular with hobbyists who cross and recross varieties, creating new varieties. Competitions are held to exhibit and judge the many resulting new seedlings and often strikingly unique flowers.. The plant is known as easy to propagate.

== Origin ==
The origin of the species has long been unknown; it has never been found out of cultivation. A study in 2024 based on molecular and morphological data showed that it is a hybrid created in cultivation by Polynesians through a cross between Hibiscus cooperi and Hibiscus kaute. The parent species were originally from Vanuatu and Tahiti respectively. The natural distributions of the parents are more than 4,000 km (2,500 miles) apart. H. kaute was important in Polynesian culture and medicine, which appears to have led to it being taken across the south Pacific as canoe plants via traditional Polynesian seafaring, where it eventually hybridized with H. cooperi.

== Ecology ==
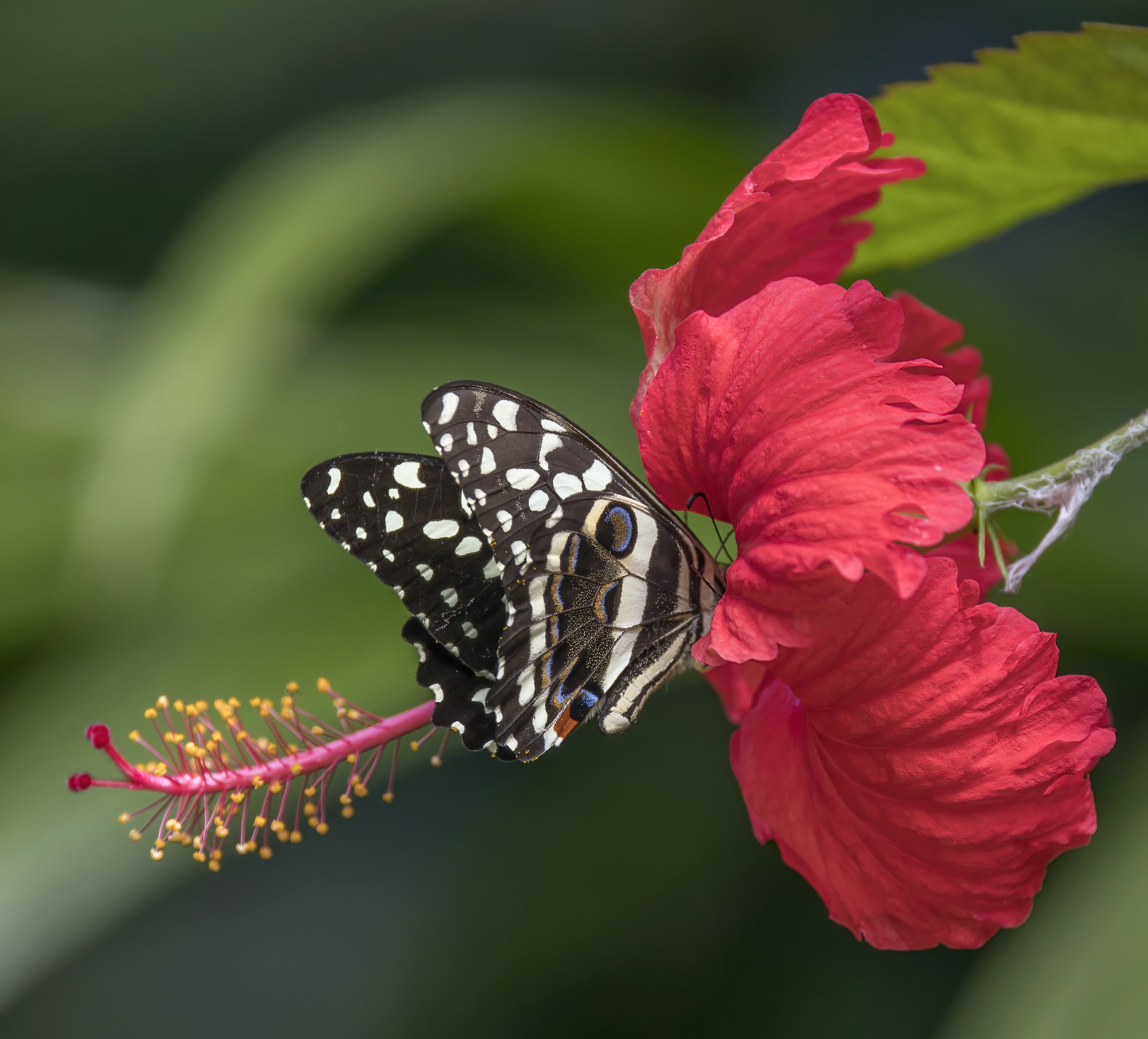
Papilio demodocus nectaring on São Tomé and Príncipe

Despite its size and colorful hues which are typically attractive to nectarivore birds, the flowers of Hibiscus × rosa-sinensis are not visited regularly by hummingbirds when grown in the Neotropics. Generalist species, like the sapphire-spangled emerald (Amazilia lactea), or long-billed species, like the stripe-breasted starthroat (Heliomaster squamosus) are occasionally seen to visit the flowers. In the subtropical and temperate Americas, hummingbirds are regularly attracted to hibiscus.

The endangered Papilio homerus butterfly, the largest in the western hemisphere, is known to feed on the nectar of H. × rosa-sinensis.

== Cultivation ==
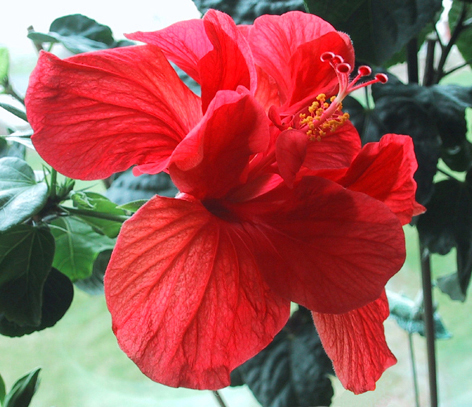
Pollen parent

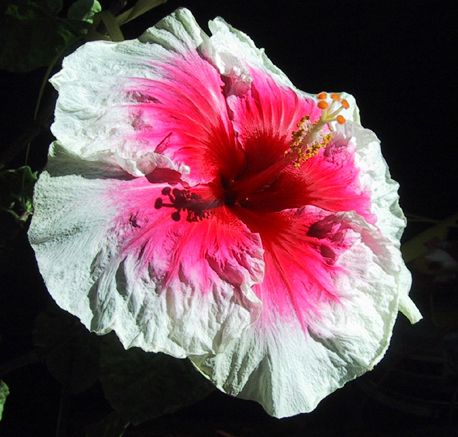
Pod parent

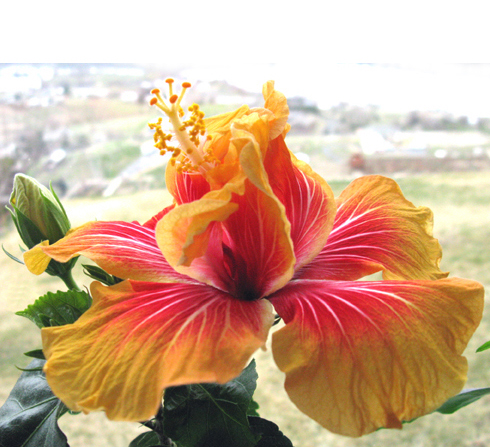
One offspring

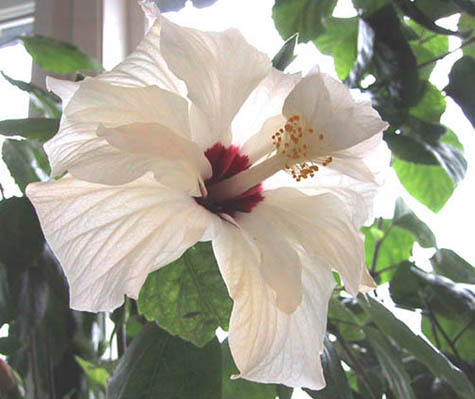
Another offspring

Example: two crosses of 'King Kalakaua' and 'Mystic Pink'. The photographs demonstrate that the flowers of the offspring plants have almost no color characteristics of the parent plants, and few of the physical characteristics.

Hibiscus × rosa-sinensis is widely grown as an ornamental plant throughout the tropics and subtropics. As it does not tolerate temperatures below 10 °C (50 °F), in temperate regions it is best grown under glass. Plants grown in containers may be placed outside during the summer months and moved into shelter during the winter months.

Numerous cultivars exist, with flower colors ranging from white through yellow and orange to scarlet and shades of pink, with both single and double sets of petals. The cultivar 'Cooperi' has gained the Royal Horticultural Society's Award of Garden Merit.

== Uses ==
The flowers of H. × rosa-sinensis are edible and are used in salads in the Pacific Islands. The flower is used as an accessory, particularly as a hairpiece. It is also used to shine shoes in certain parts of India, hence the common name "shoeblack plant". In Indonesia and Malaysia, these flowers are called "kembang sepatu" or "bunga sepatu", which literally means "shoe flower". The flower can also be used as a pH indicator; when used, the flower turns acidic solutions to a dark pink or magenta color and turns basic solutions to green. In several countries the flowers are dried to use in a beverage, usually tea.

Hibiscus × rosa-sinensis is considered to have a number of medical uses in Chinese herbology. Traditional uses in China have been to make a black shoe-polish from its flower petals, or to make a woman's black hair dye. The flowers are also used in parts of China to color various intoxicating liquors. The plant may have some potential in cosmetic skin care; for example, an extract from the flowers of H. × rosa-sinensis has been shown to function as an anti-solar agent by absorbing ultraviolet radiation.

== In culture ==
Hibiscus × rosa-sinensis is the national flower of Malaysia, called bunga raya in Malay. This can be translated in a number of ways, including "great flower" or "celebratory flower." Introduced into the Malay Peninsula in the 12th century, it was nominated as the national flower in the year 1958 by the Ministry of Agriculture amongst a few other flowers, namely ylang ylang, jasmine, lotus, rose, magnolia, and medlar. On 28 July 1960, it was declared by the government of Malaysia that H. × rosa-sinensis would be the national flower. The red of the petals symbolizes the courage, life, and rapid growth of the Malaysian people, and the five petals represent the five Rukun Negara of Malaysia. The flower can be found imprinted on the notes and coins of the Malaysian ringgit.

Hibiscus × rosa-sinensis is an unofficial national flower in Haiti, where it has been used as a symbol for the promotion of tourism. The flower is also the symbol of the Fusion of Haitian Social Democrats political party. It is known in Haitian Creole language as choeblack or rose kayenn.

Red hibiscus flowers are also used for worship; in Hinduism, they are used for the worship of Devi, and in the Bengal area of eastern India, they are used to worship Kali. The hibiscus also has an important part in tantra.

=== Stamps ===
- In March 1987, DPR Korea issued a postage stamp depicting Hibiscus × rosa-sinensis.
- On 7 October 2012, Sri Lanka issued a stamp set of four, one of which depicted a Hibiscus × rosa-sinensis flower.

== Gallery ==
Cultivars with flowers of many colours are used as ornamental plants. Some have double petals or have differently shaped petals.

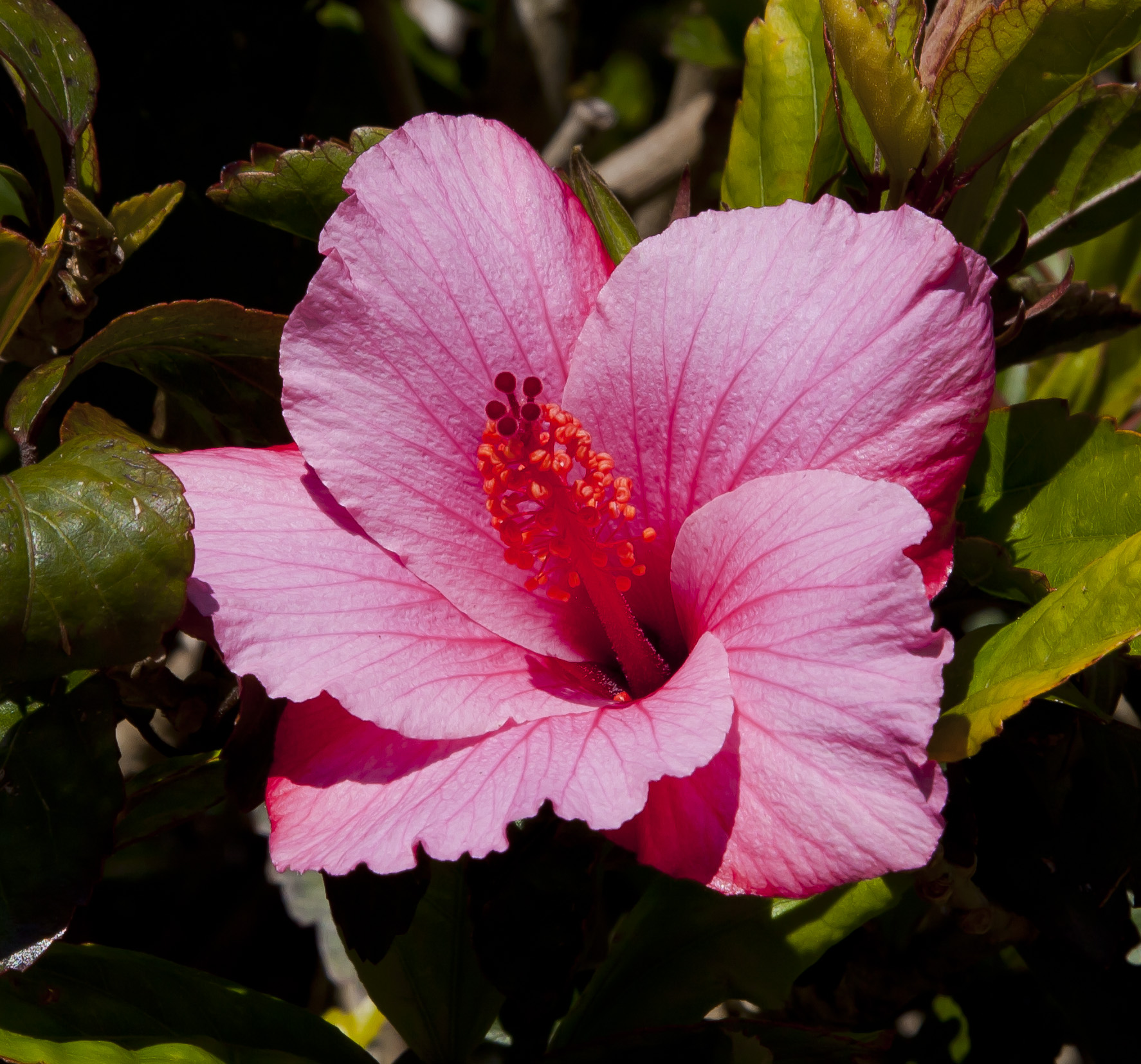

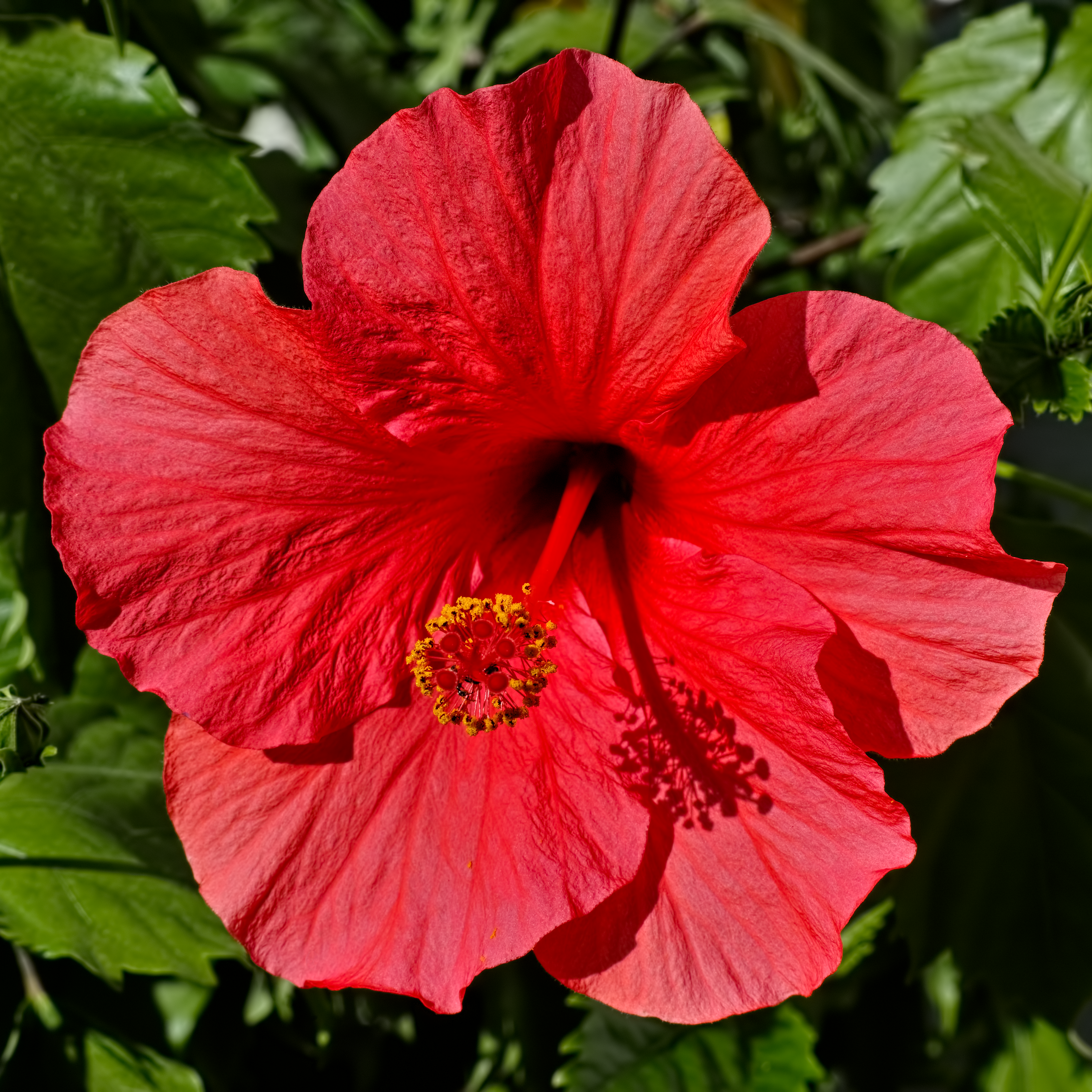

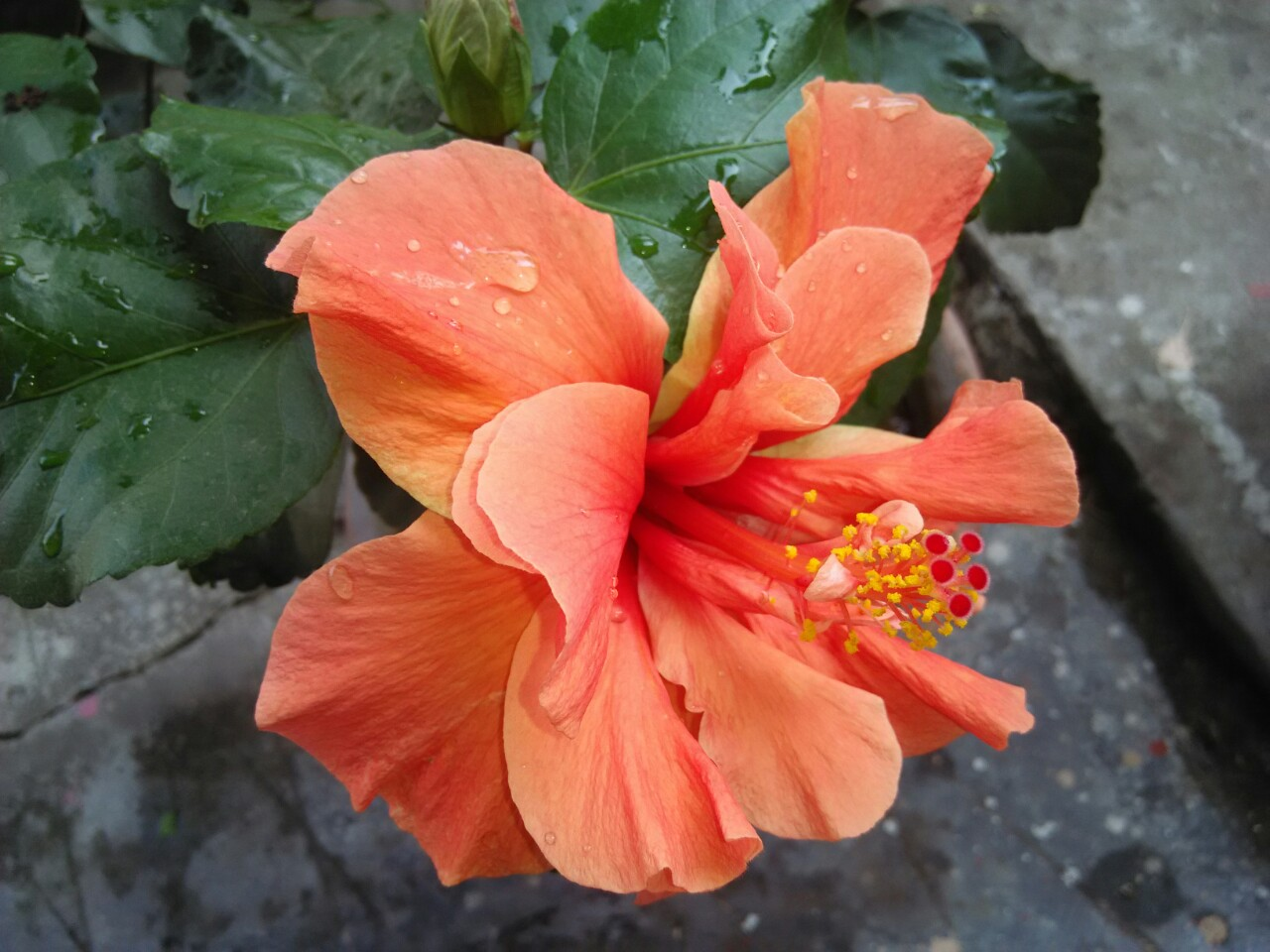

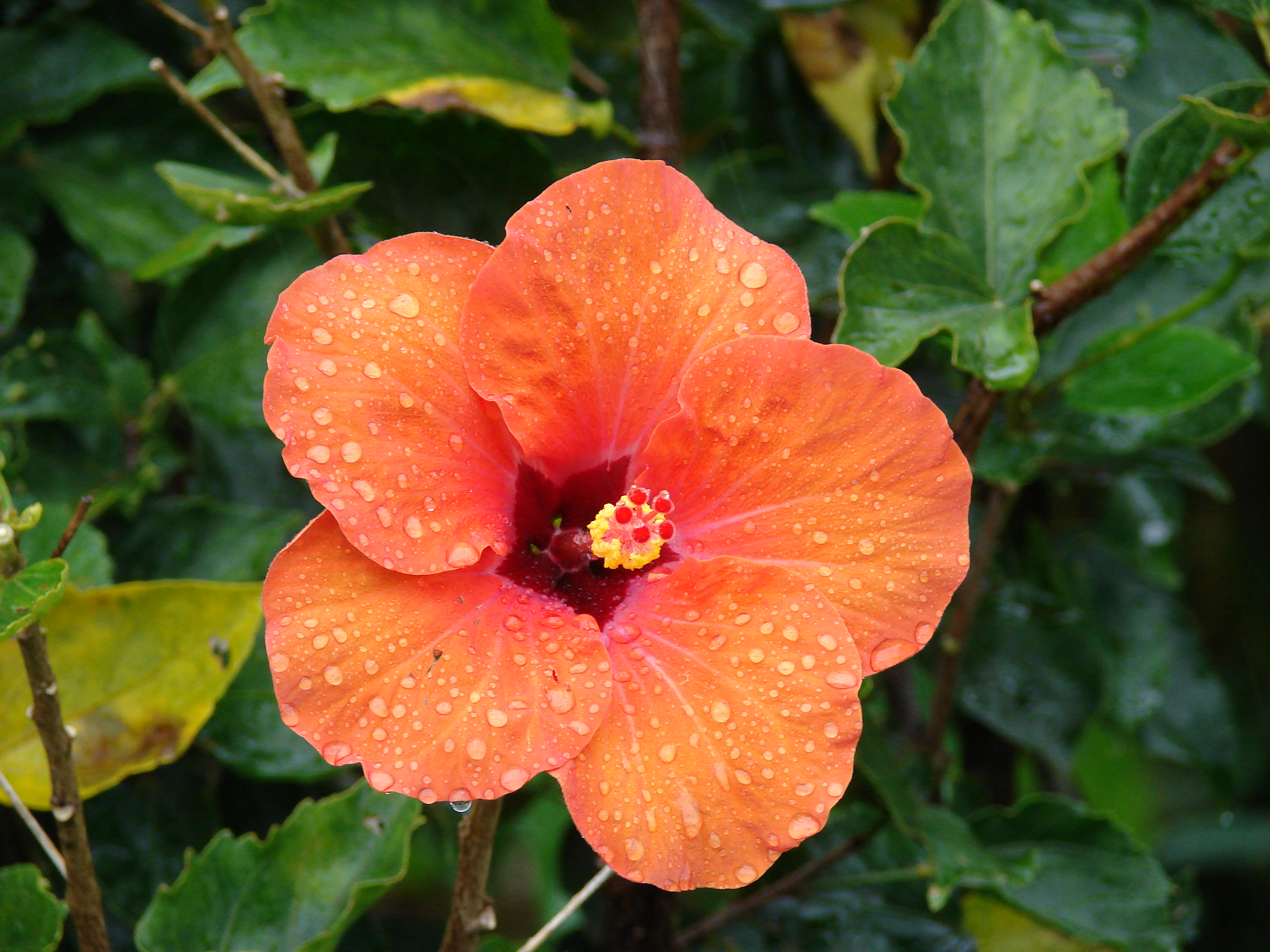

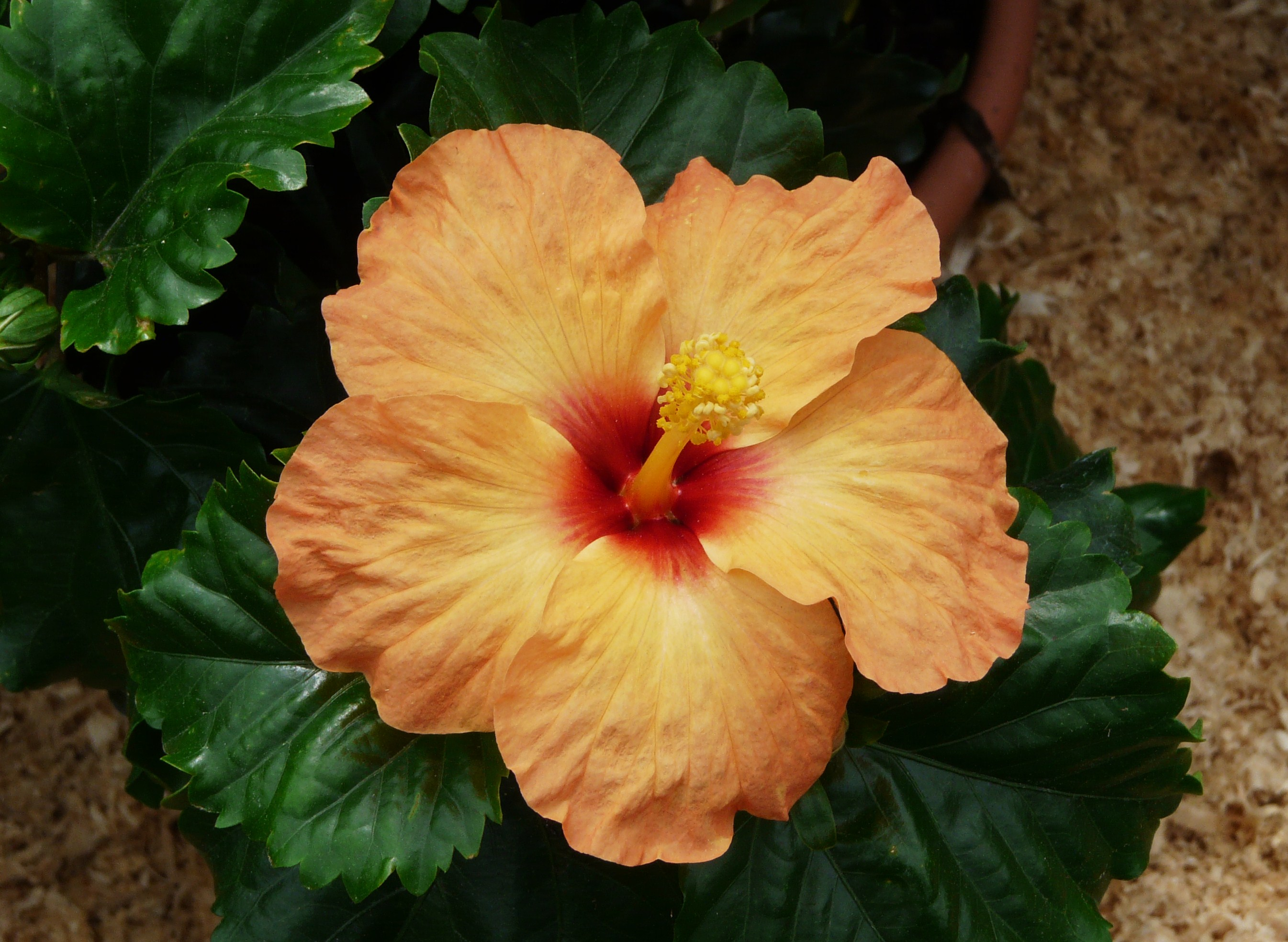

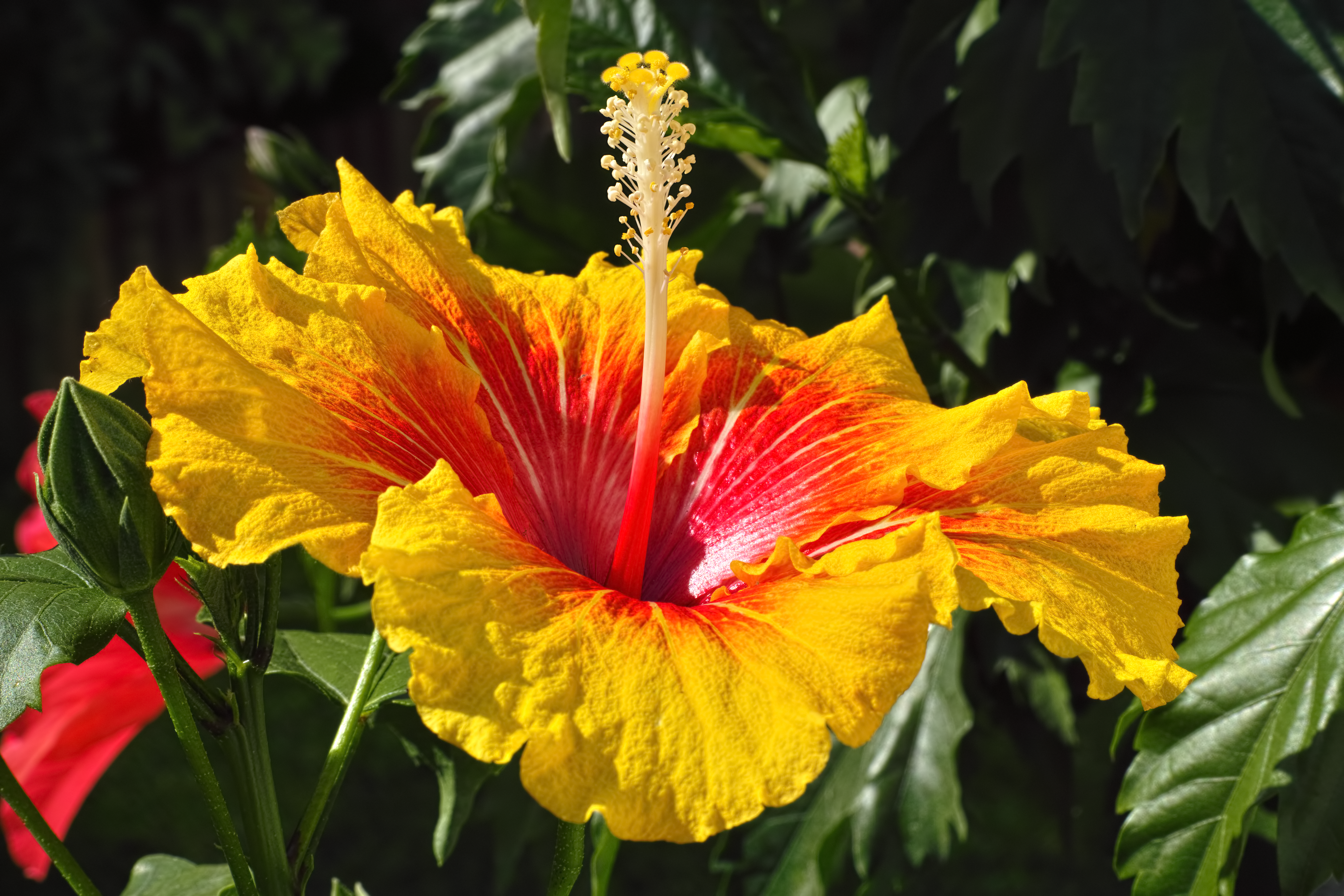

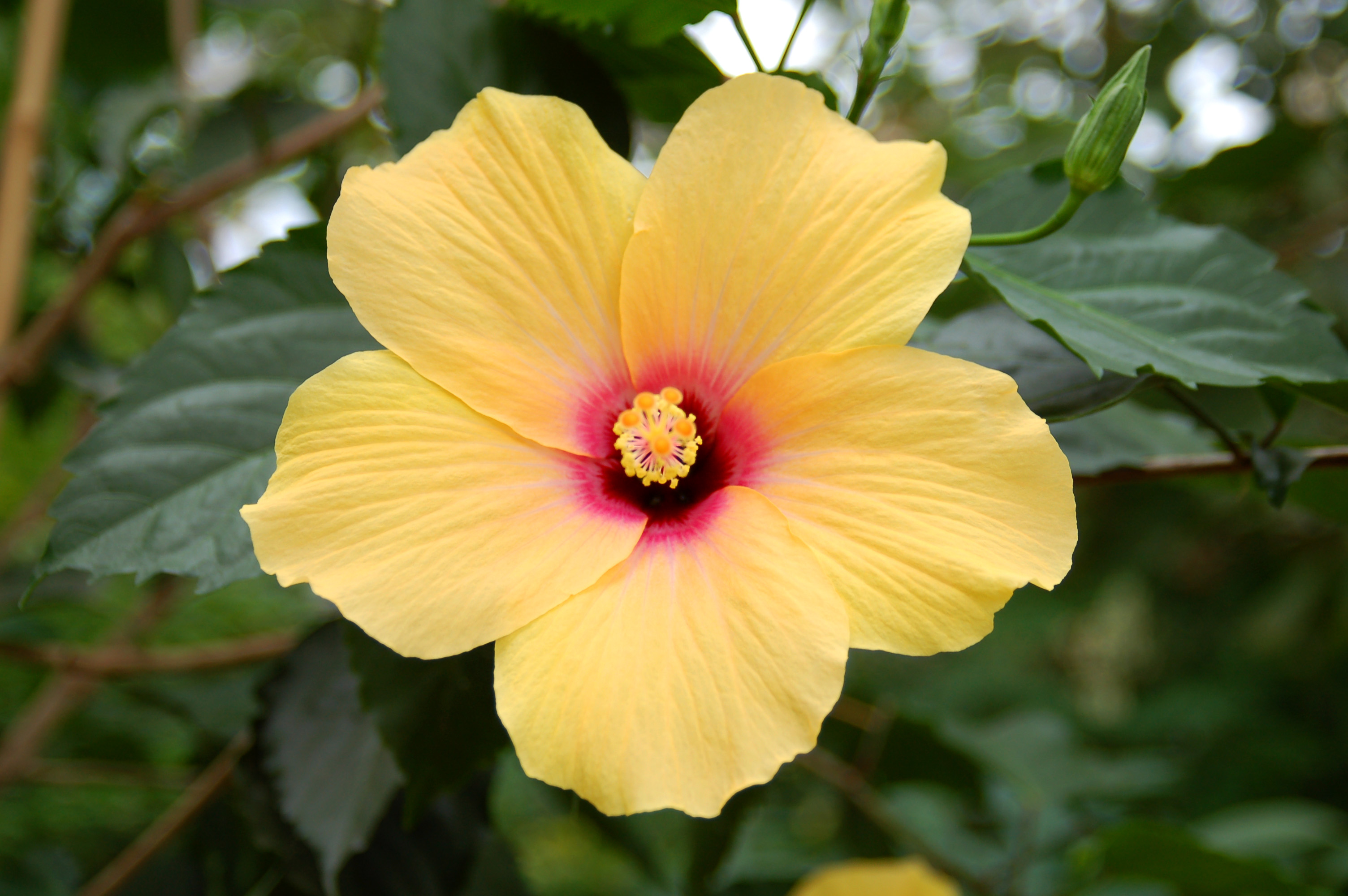

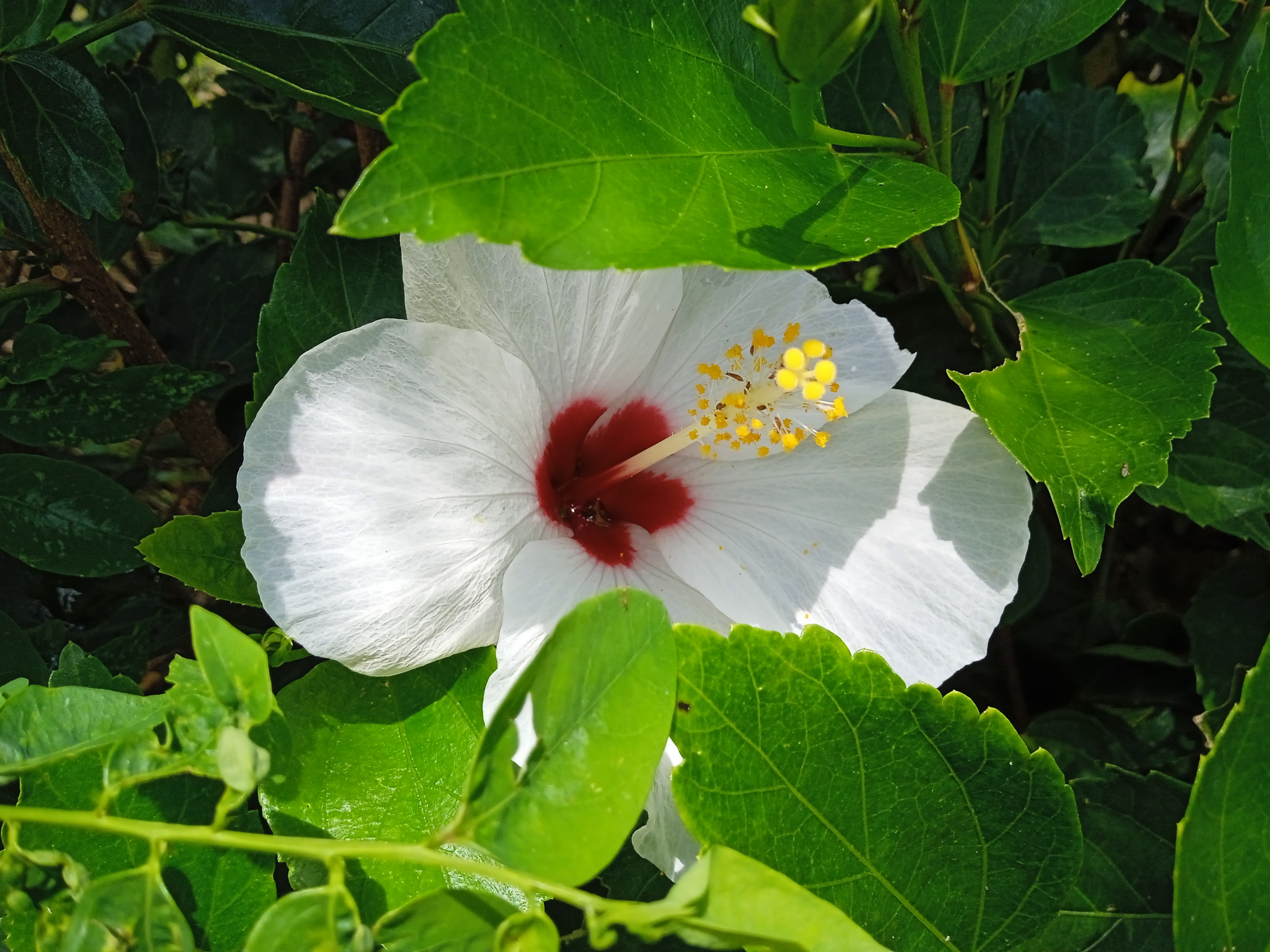

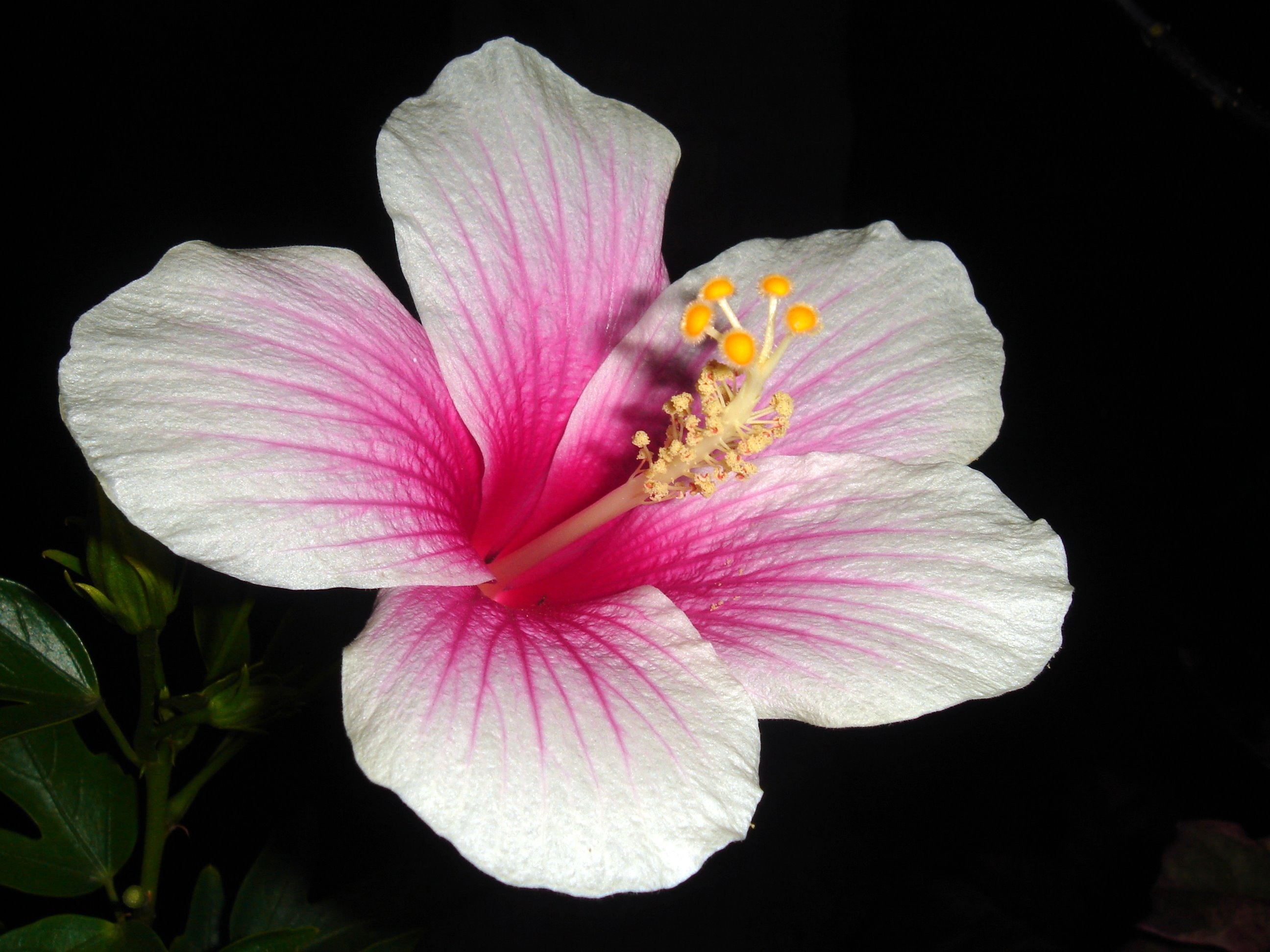

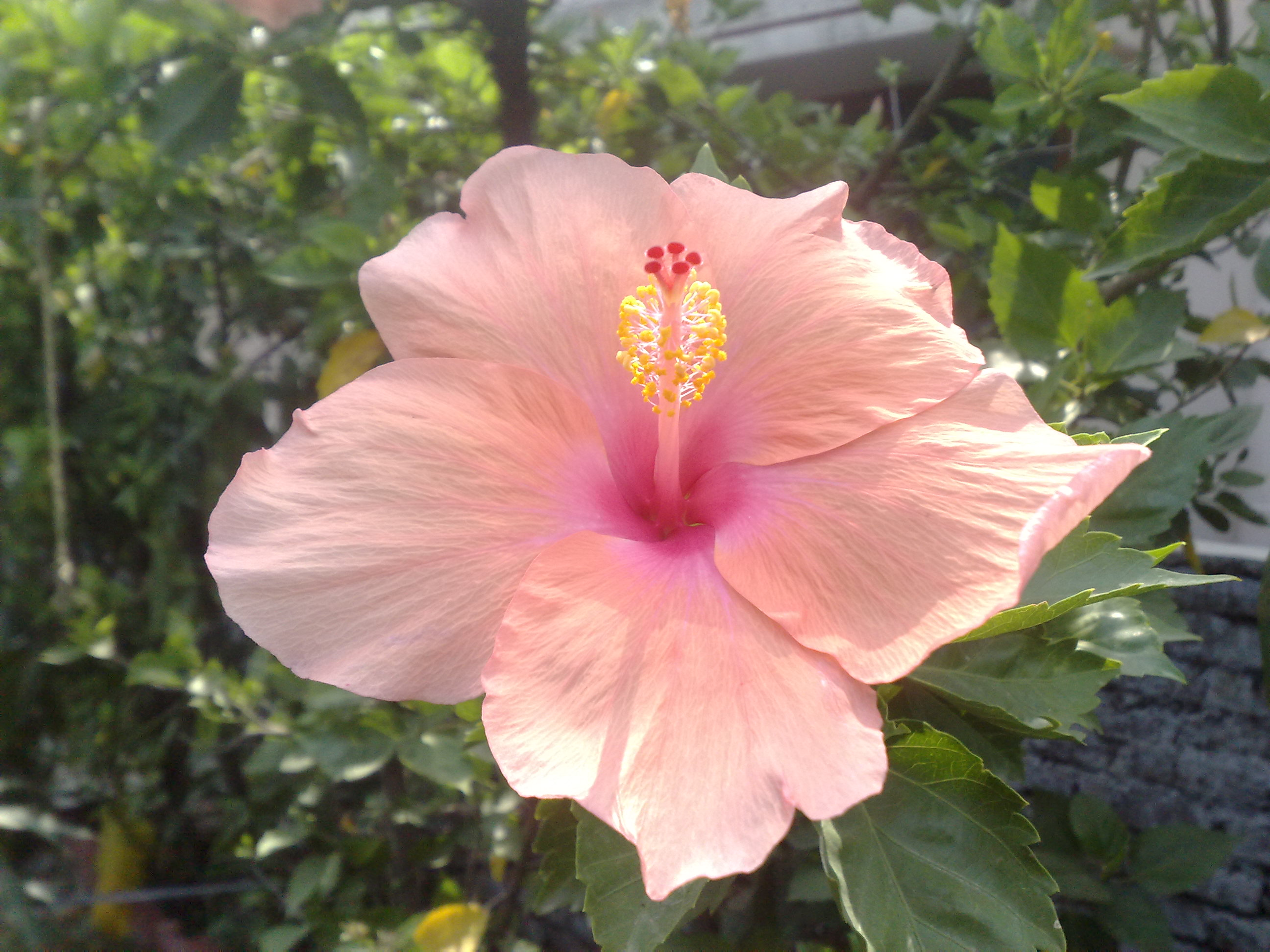

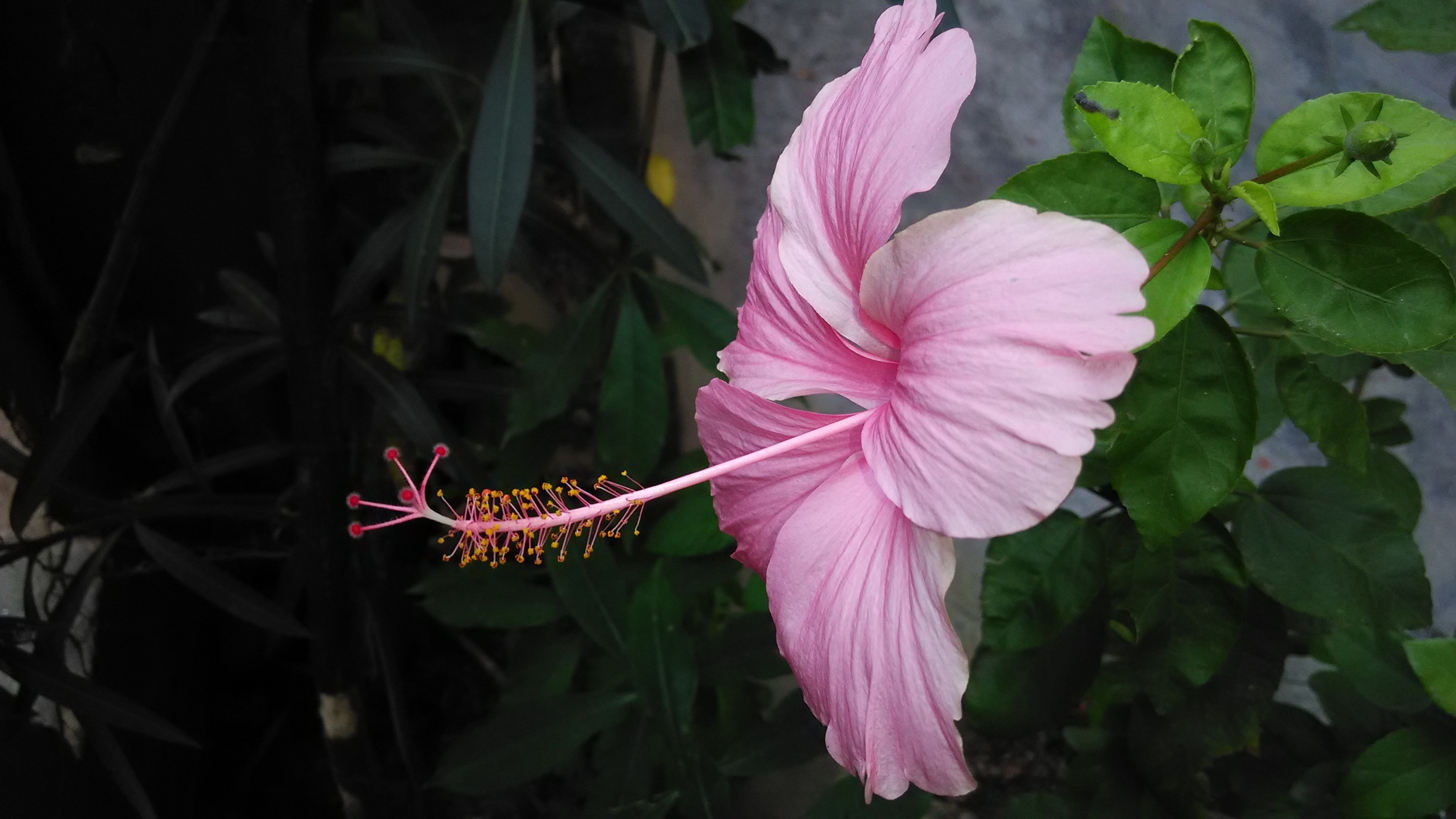

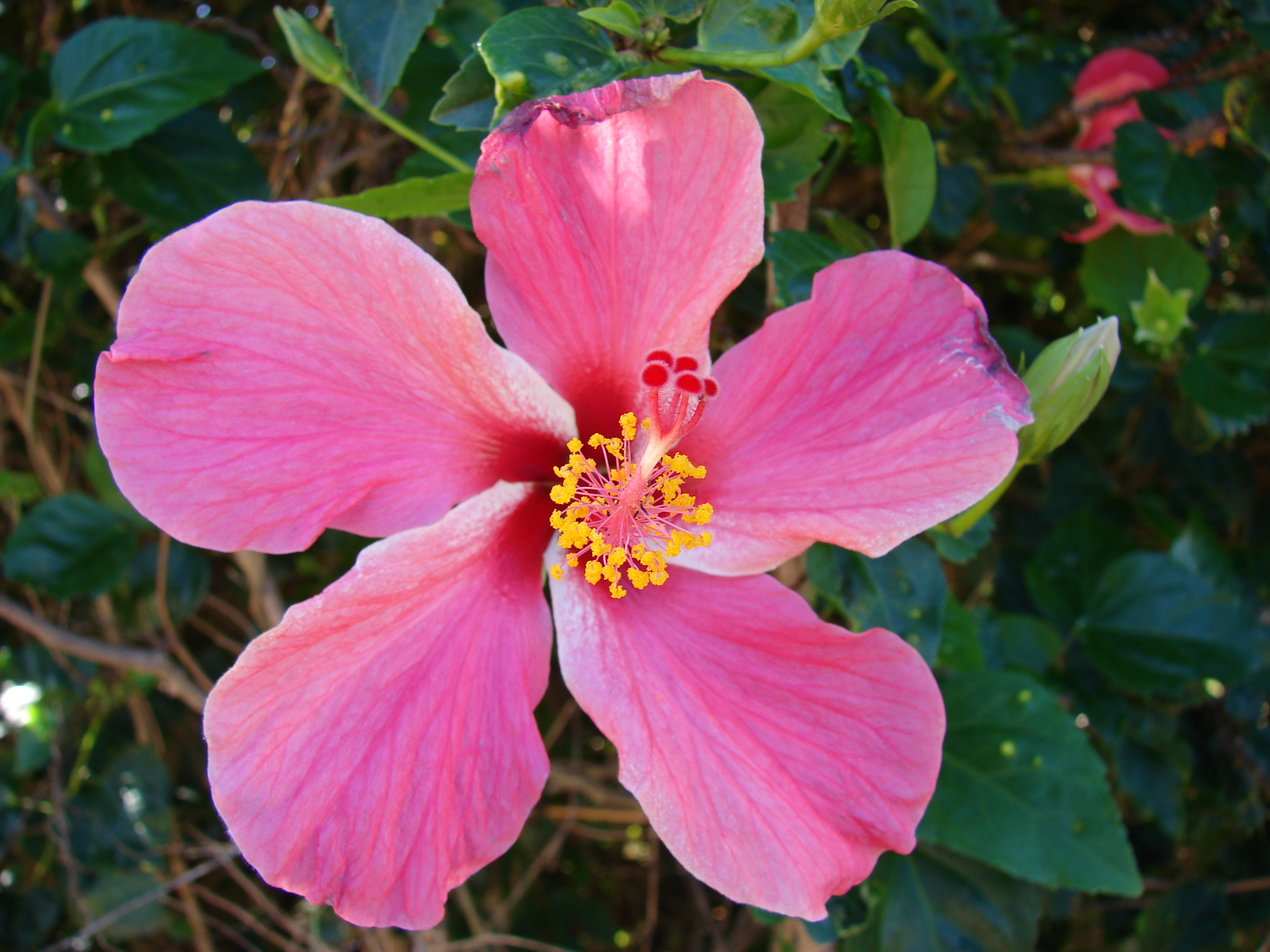

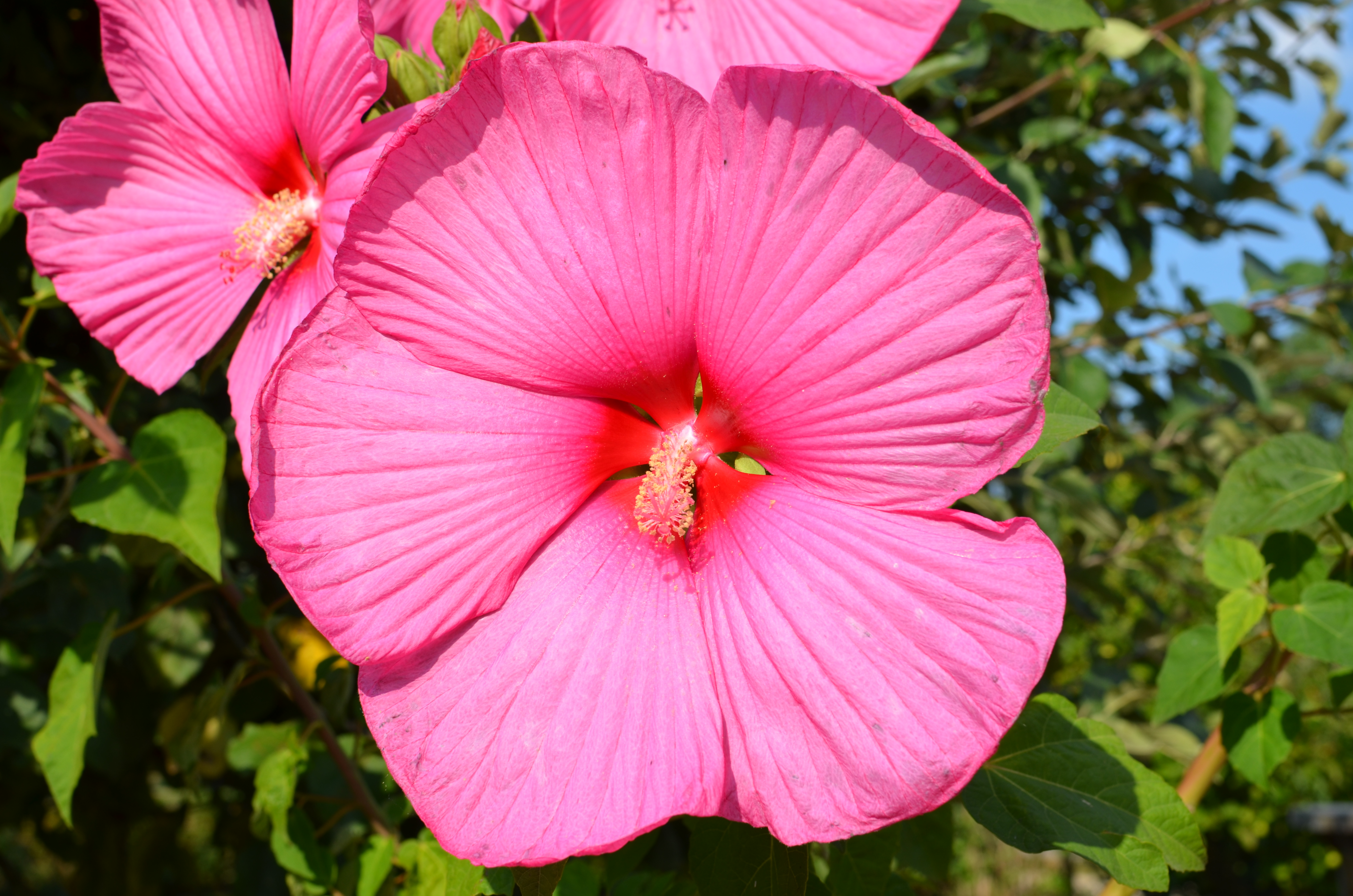

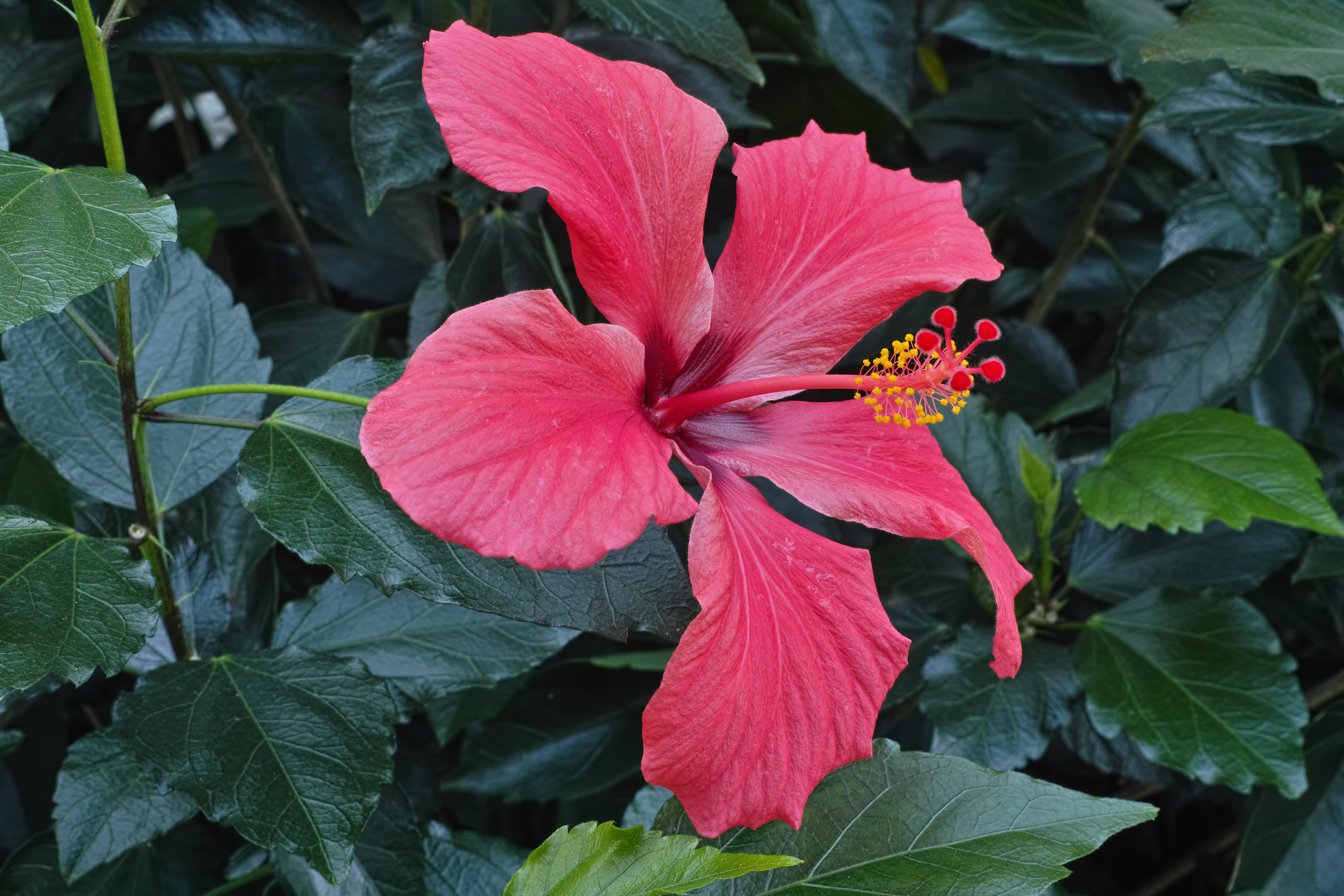

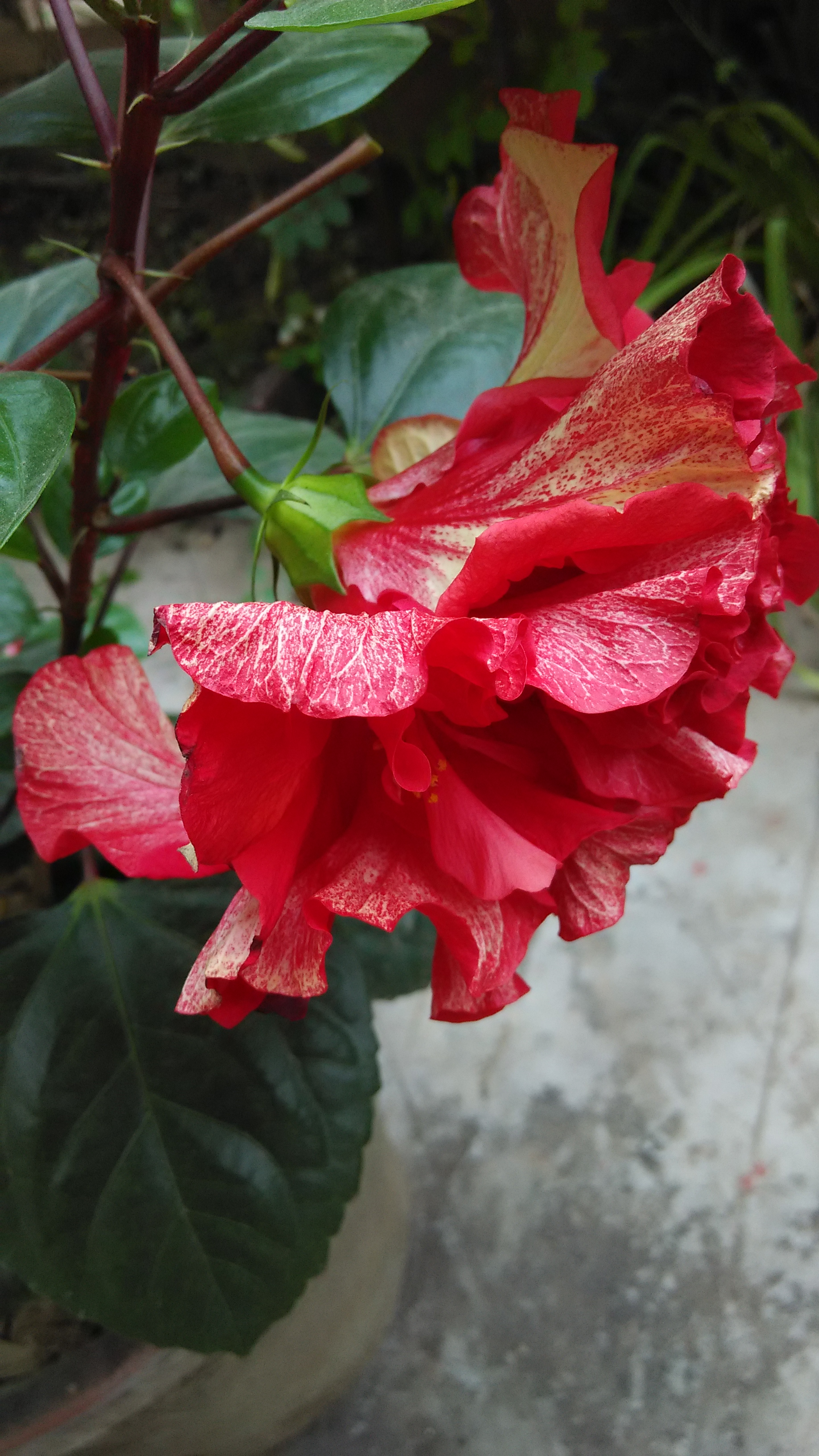

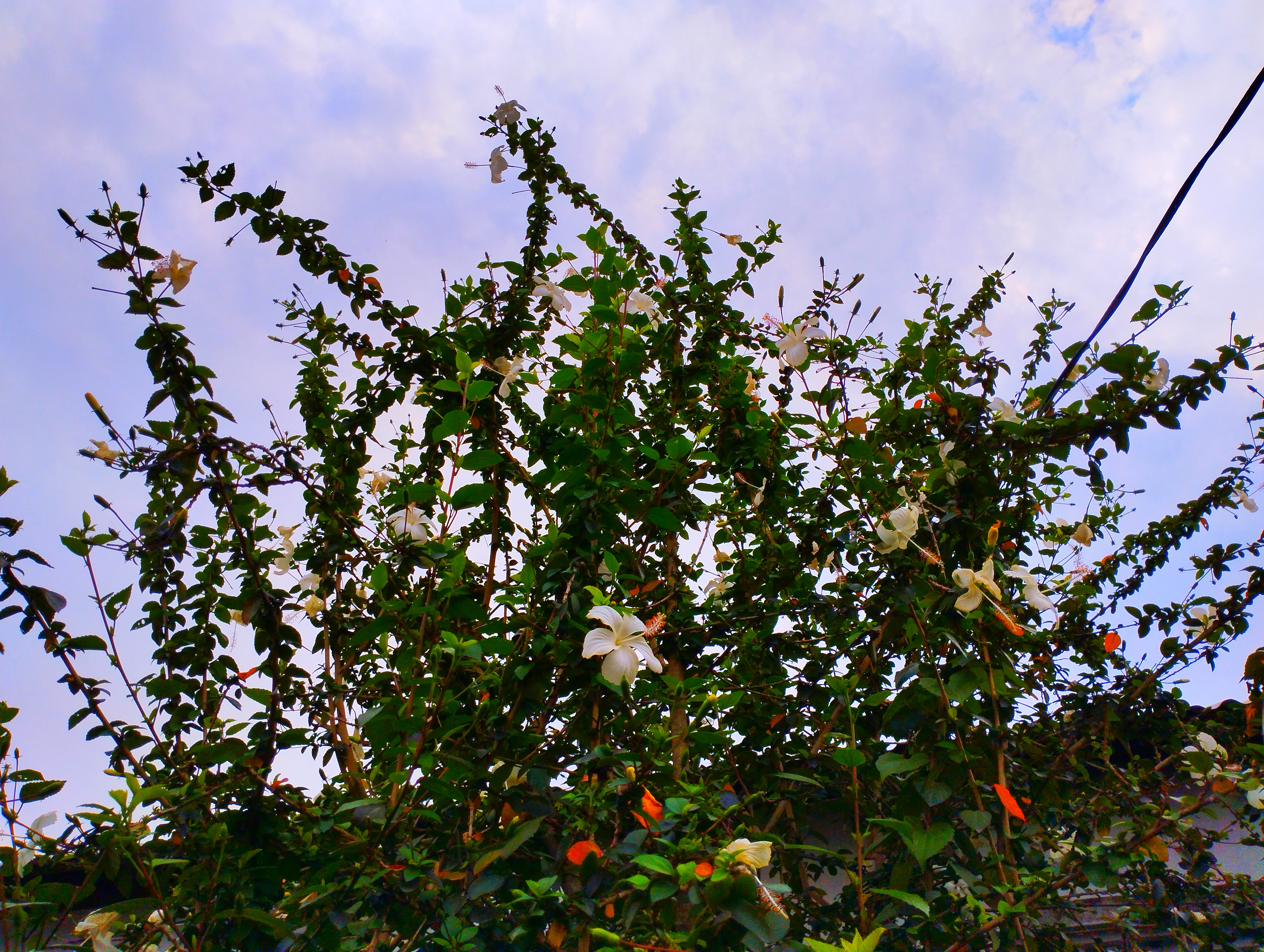

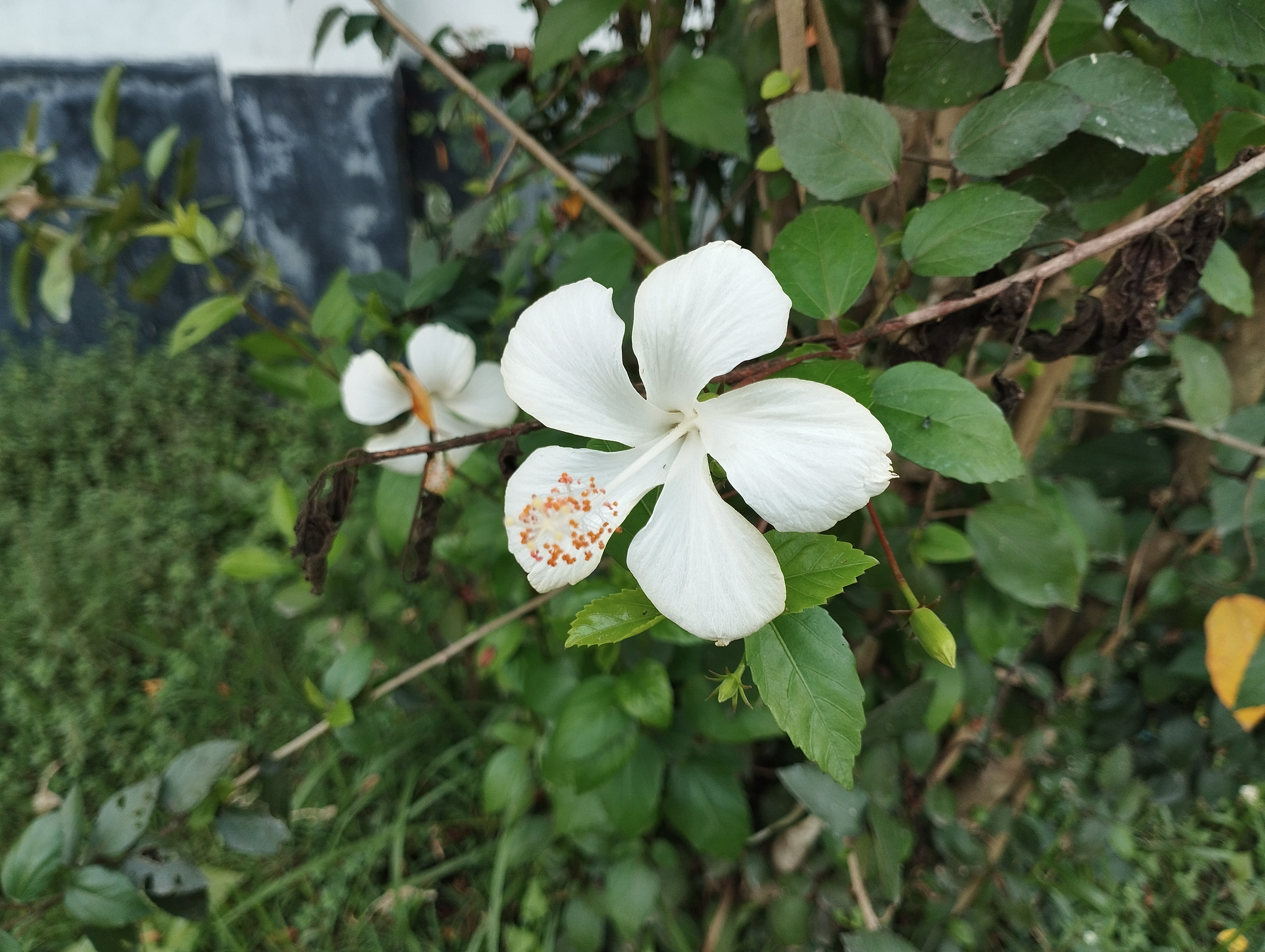

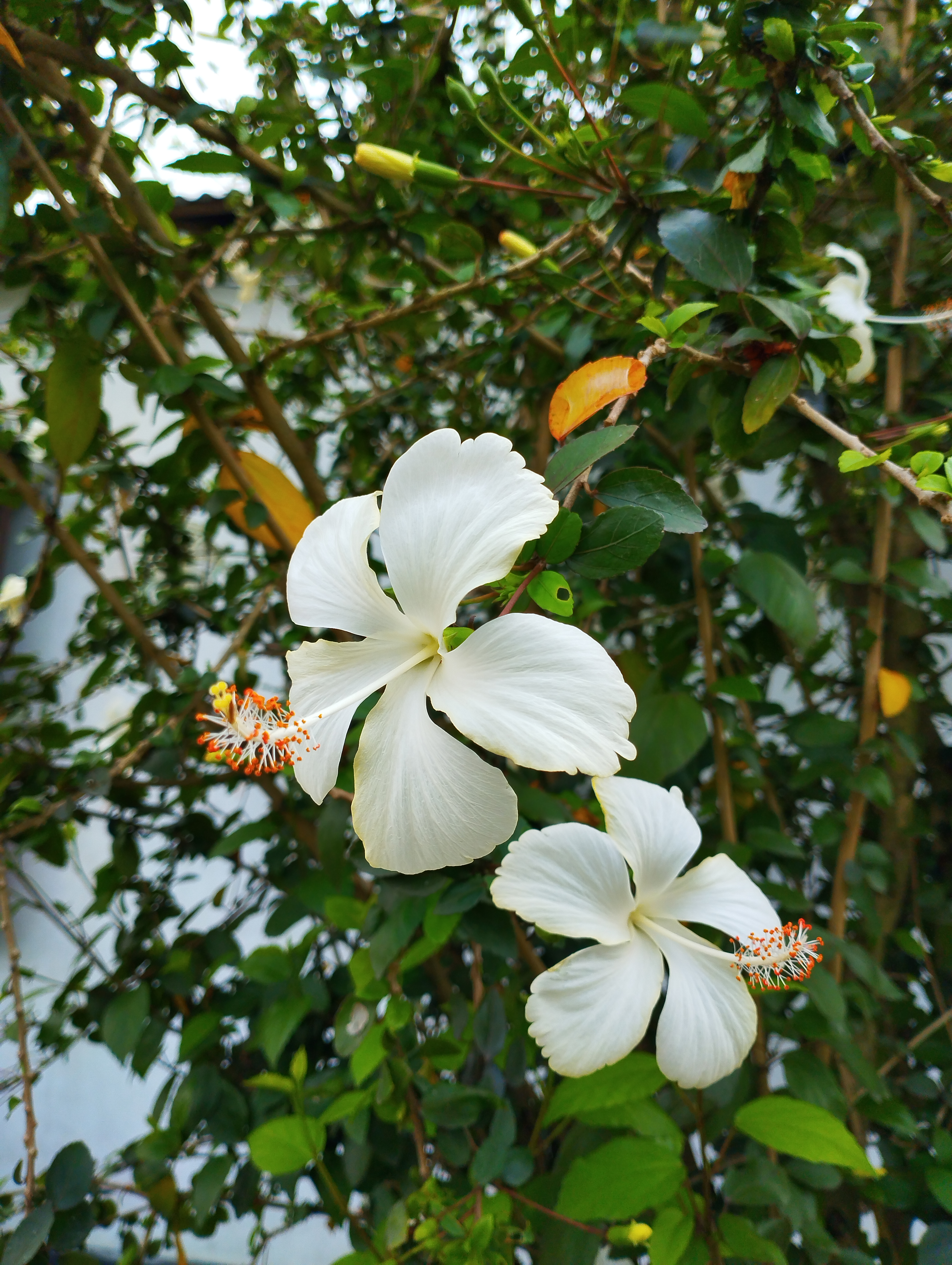

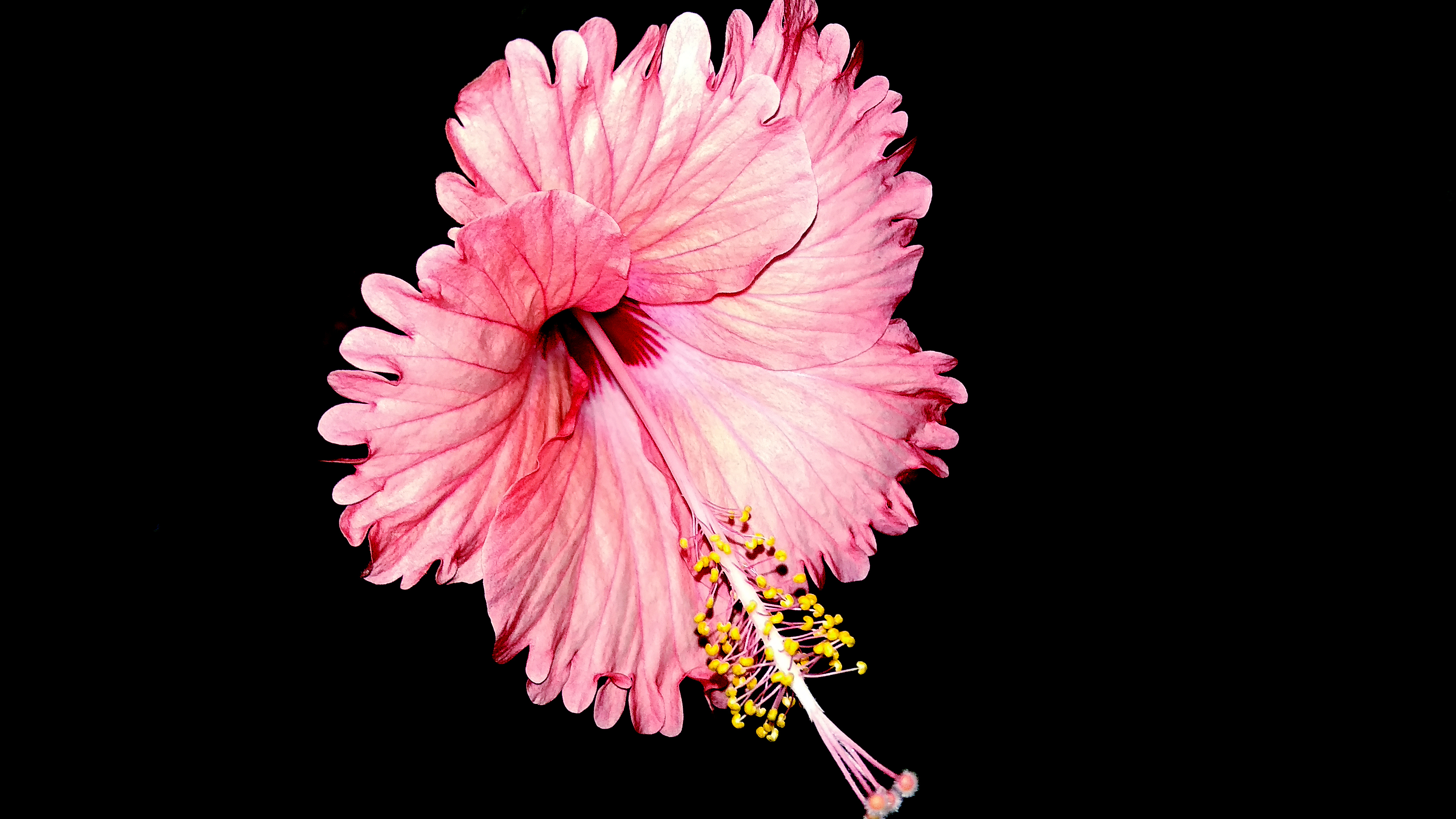

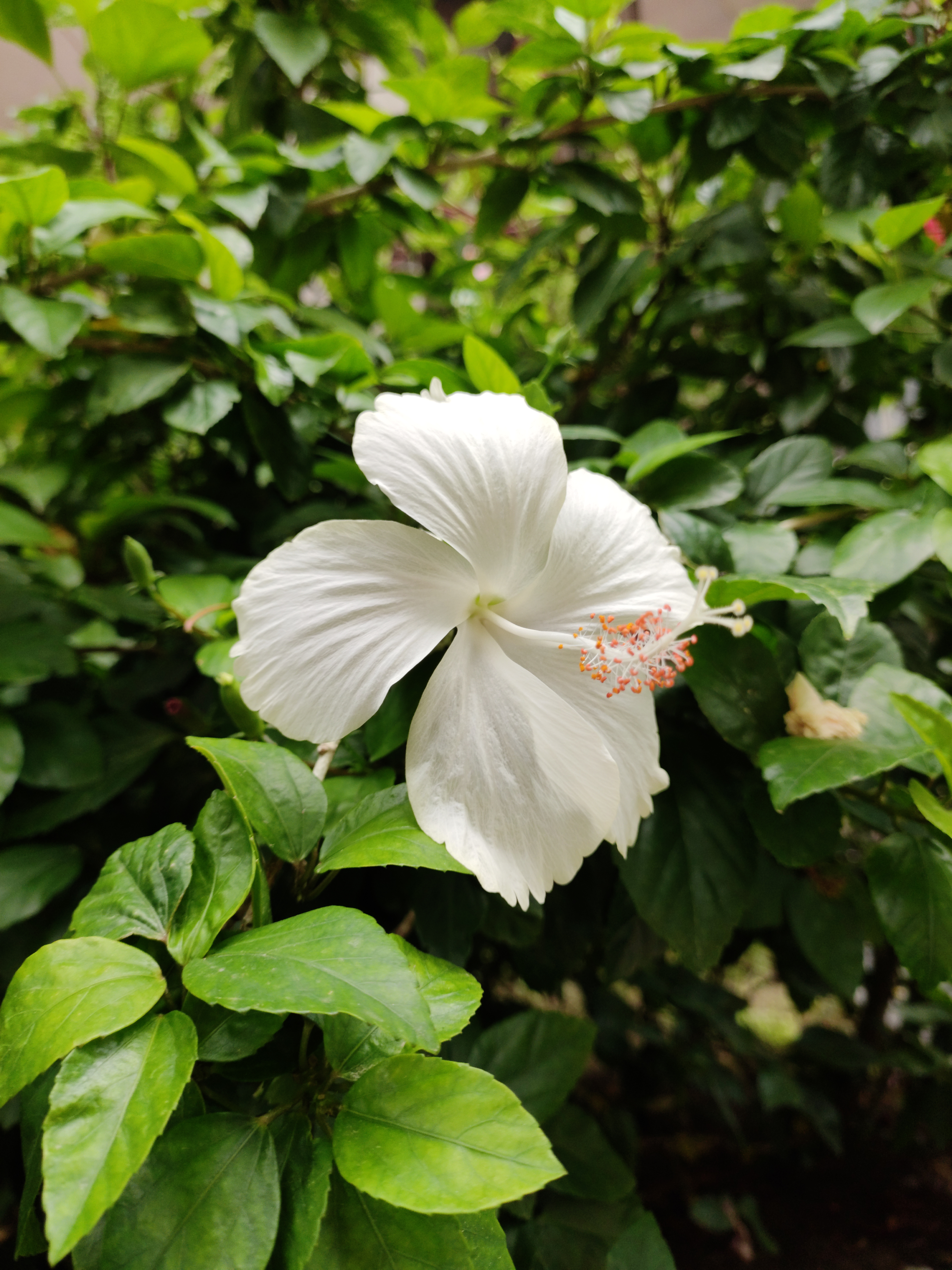

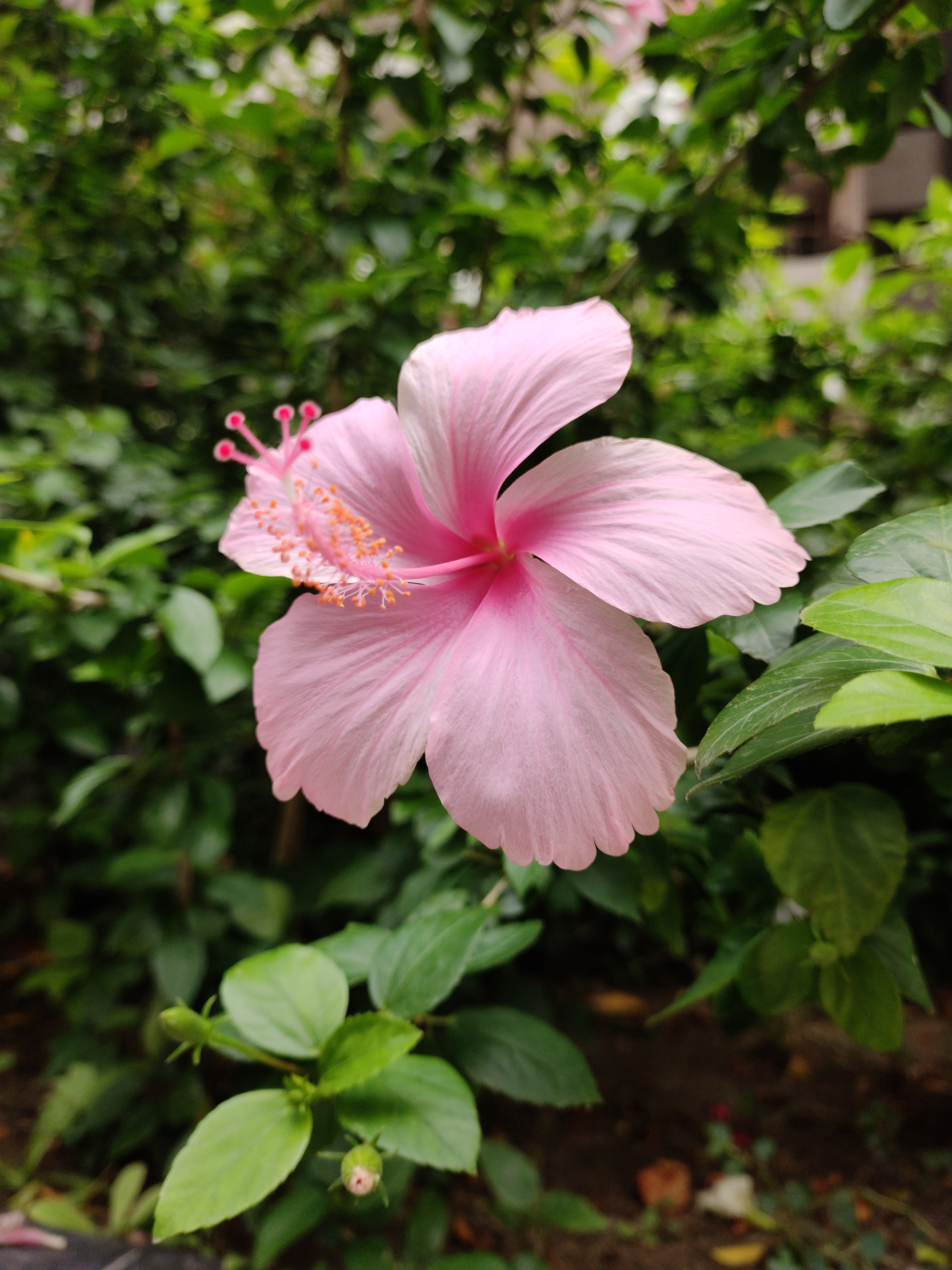

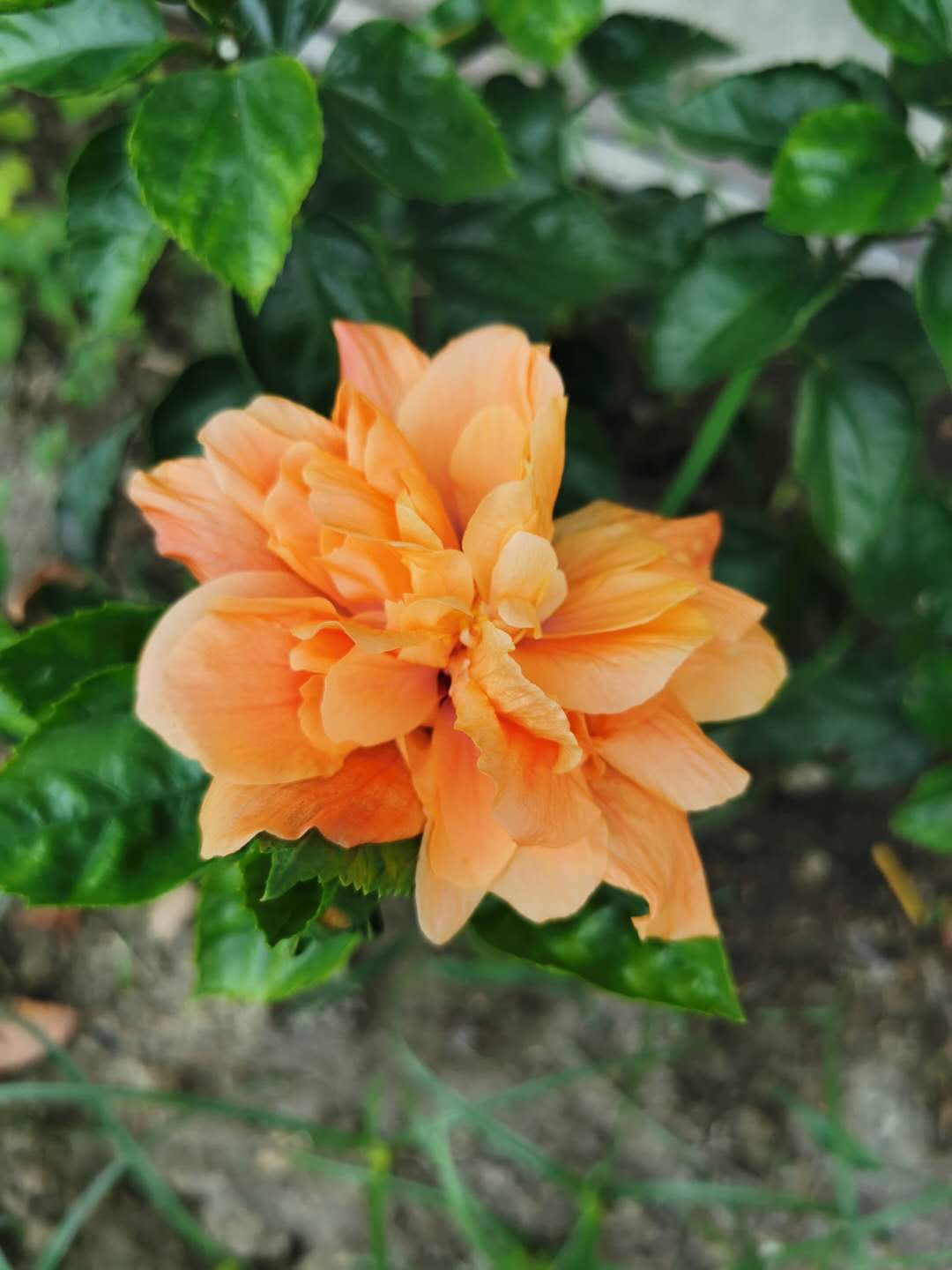

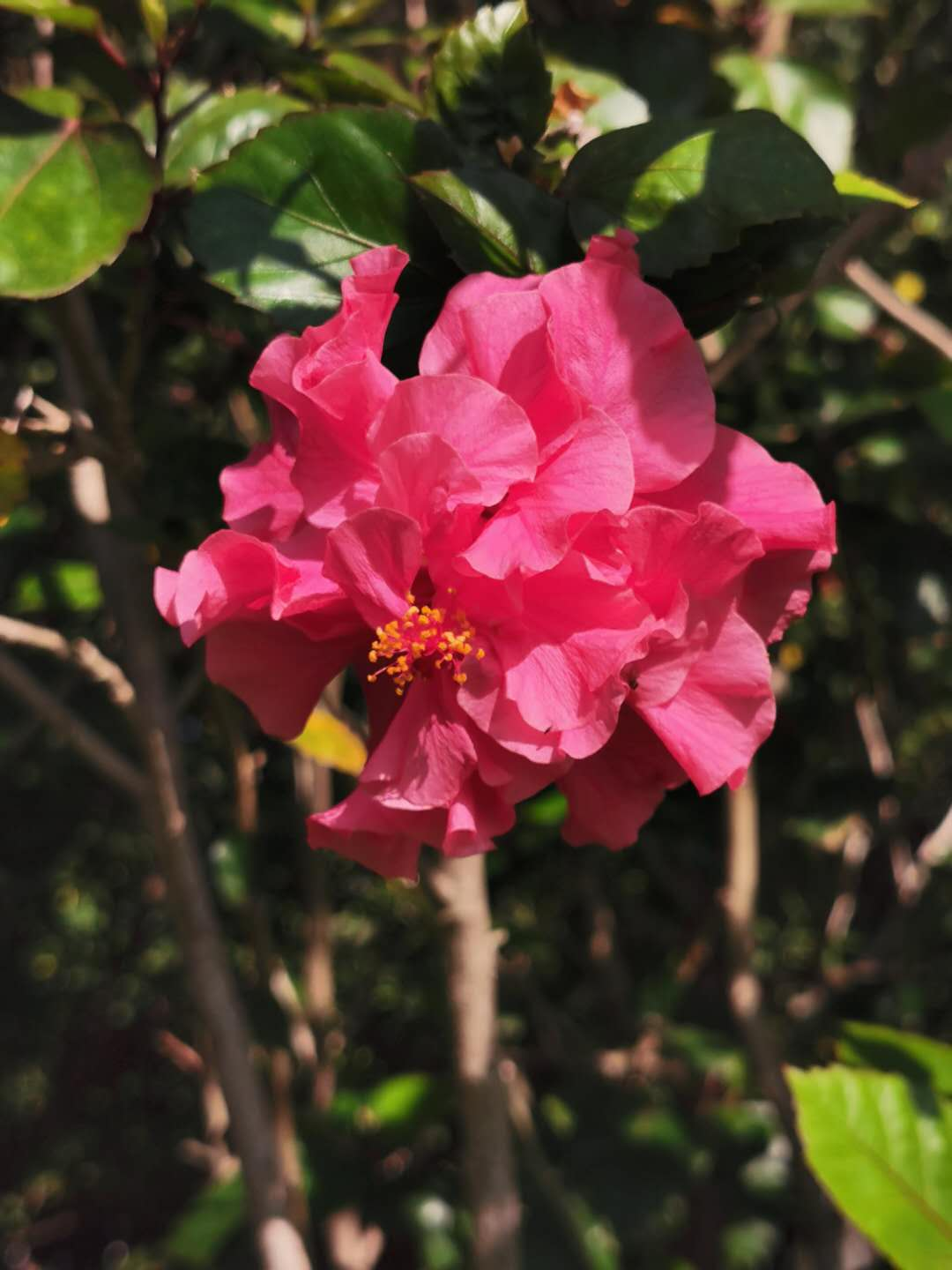

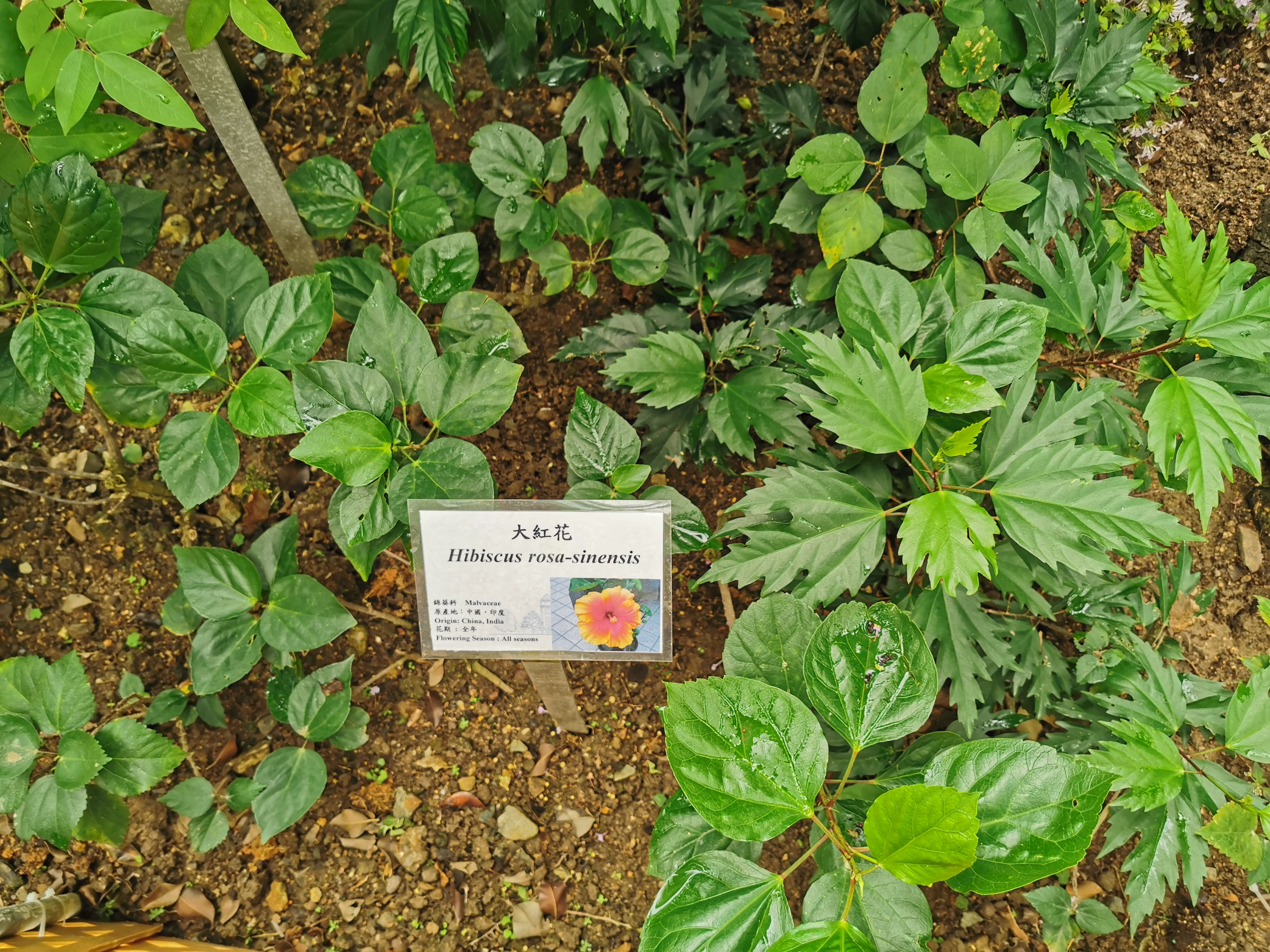

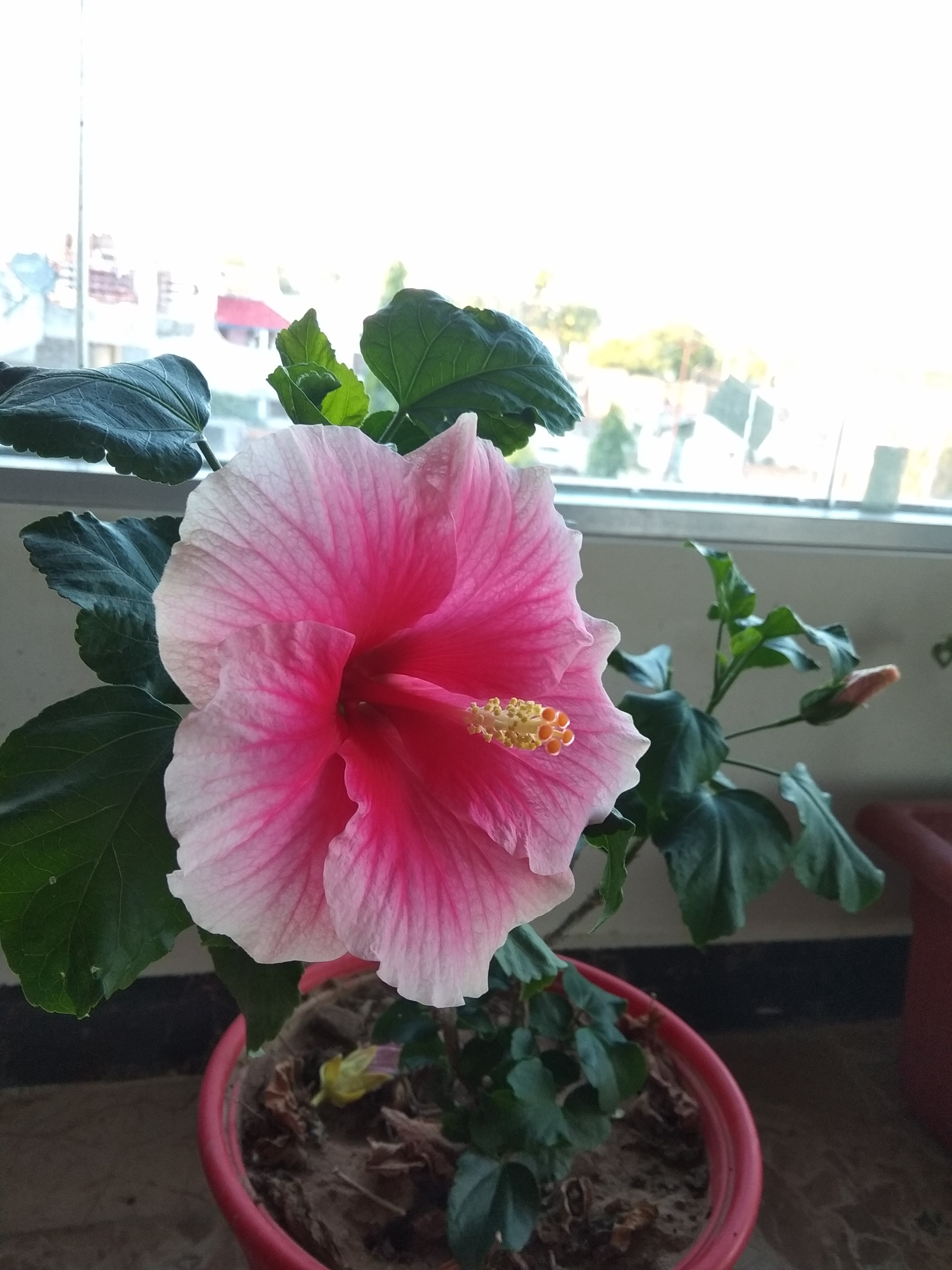

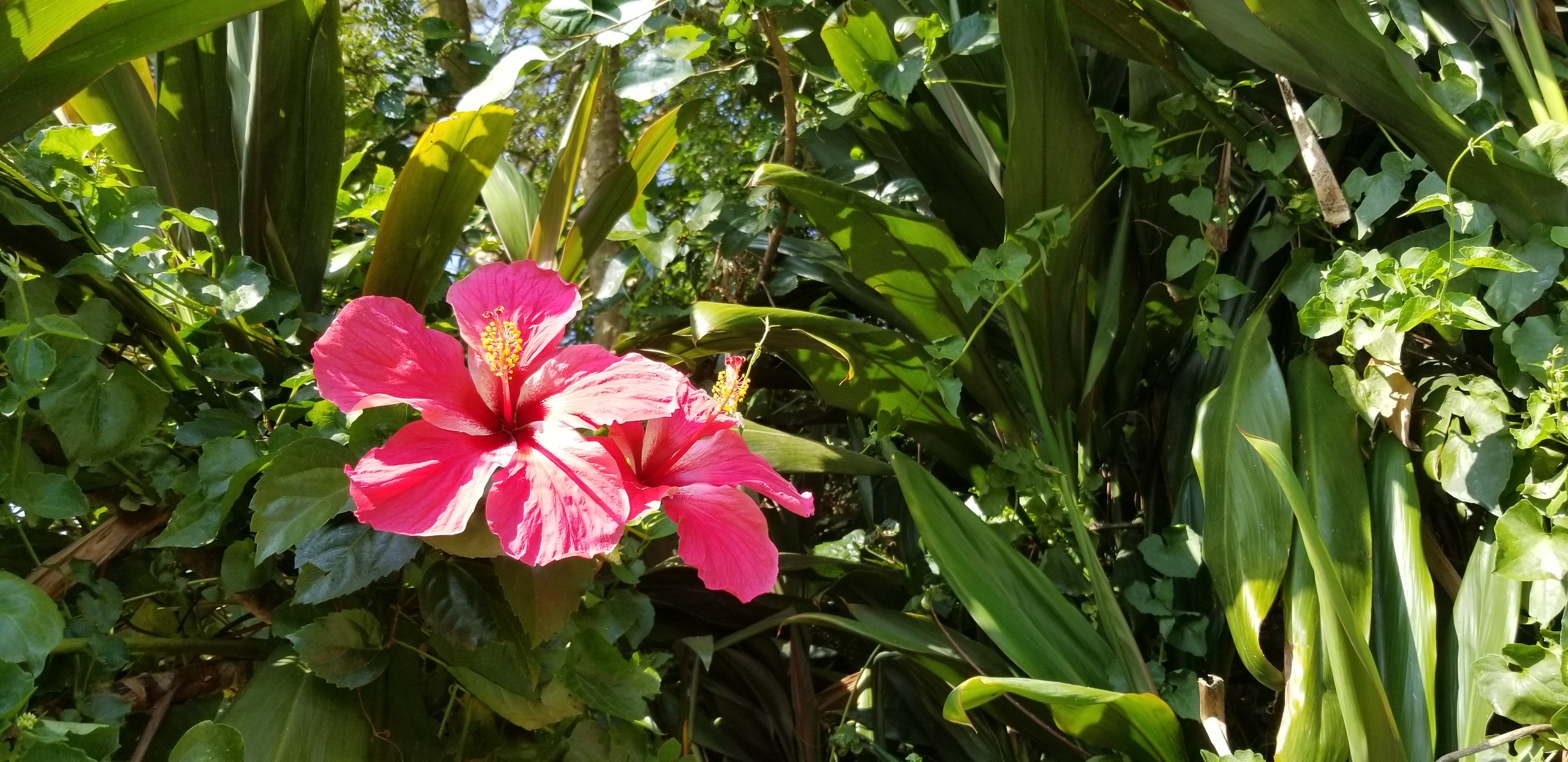

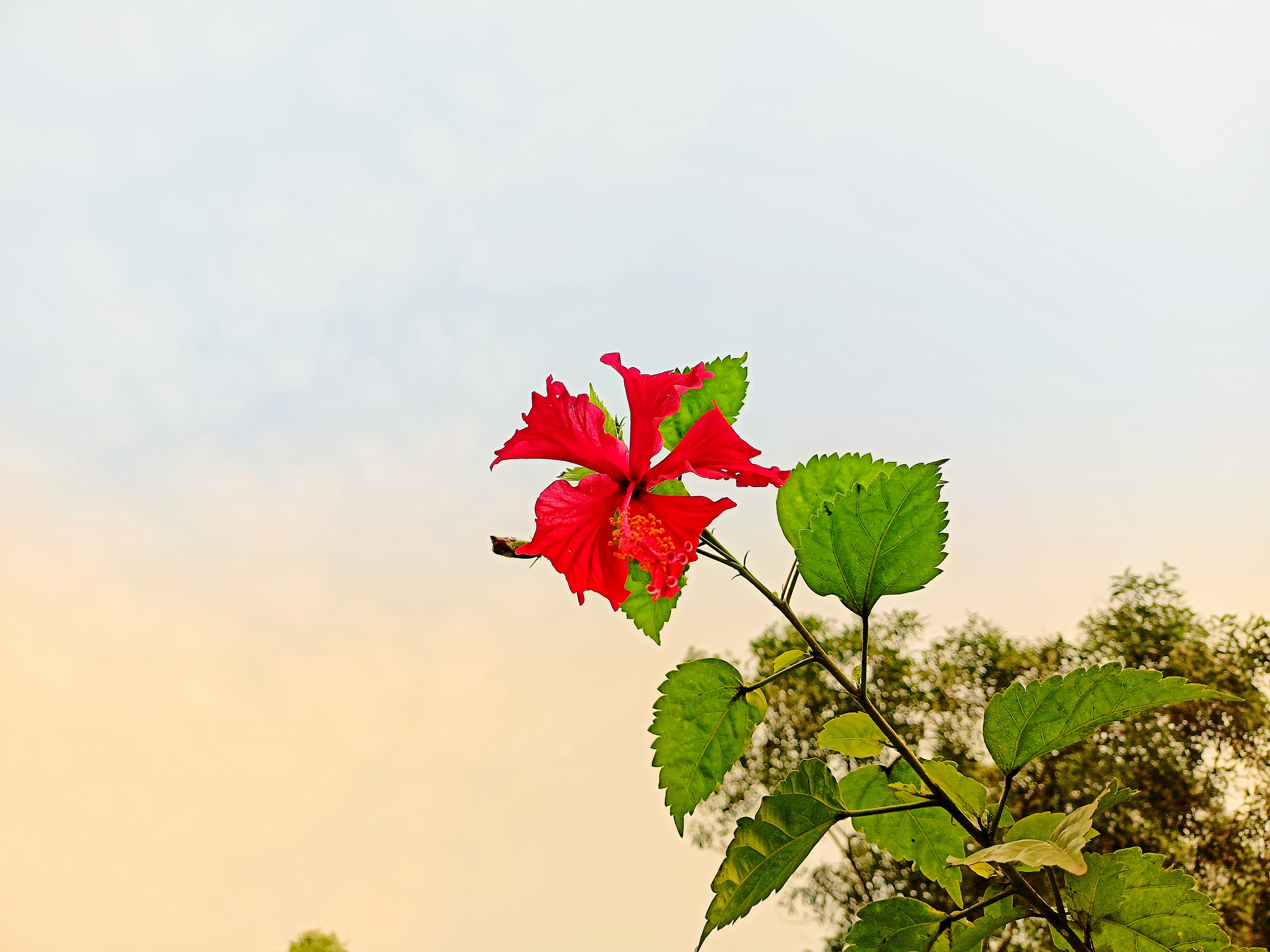

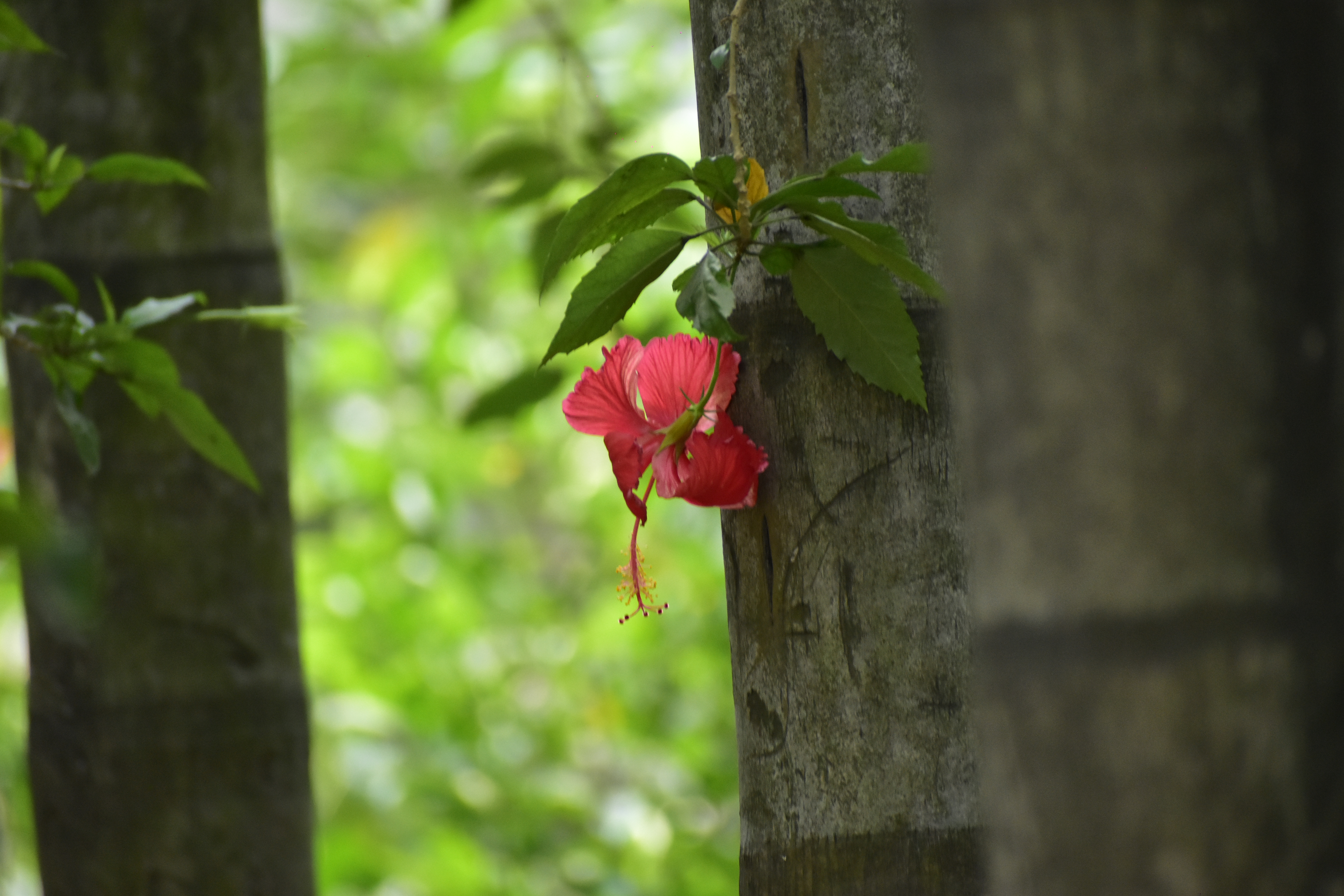
