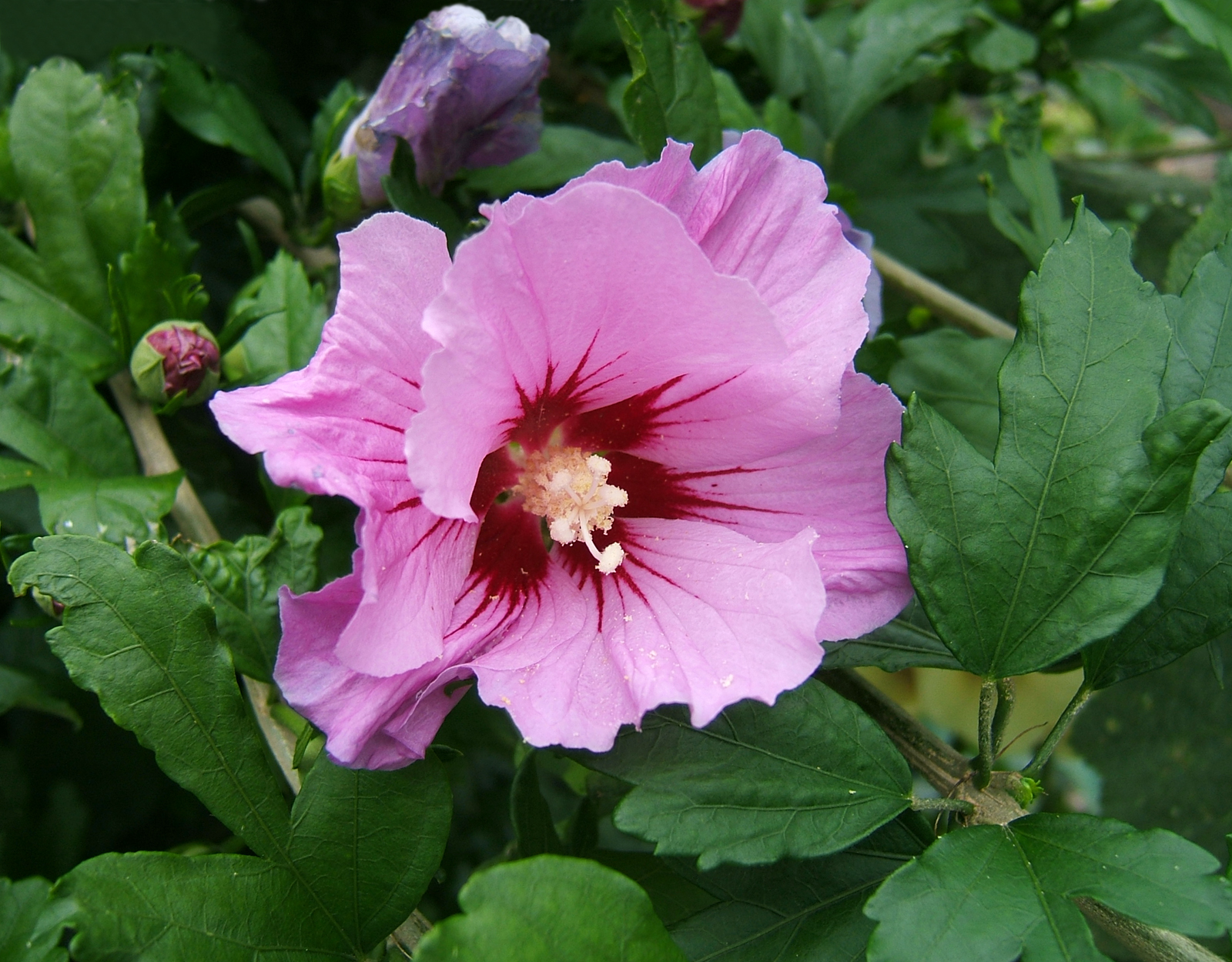
- Hibiscus syriacus

Scientific classification
- Kingdom: Plantae
- Clade: Embryophytes
- Clade: Tracheophytes
- Clade: Spermatophytes
- Clade: Angiosperms
- Clade: Eudicots
- Clade: Rosids
- Order: Malvales
- Family: Malvaceae
- Subfamily: Malvoideae
- Tribe: Hibisceae; Rchb.

Genera
- See text

= Hibisceae =

Tribe of flowering plants

Hibisceae is a tribe of flowering plants in the mallow family Malvaceae, subfamily Malvoideae.

== Genera ==
The following genera are included:

- Abelmoschus Medik.
- Anotea (DC.) Kunth
- Astrohibiscus McLay & R.L.Barrett
- Blanchardia M.M.Hanes & R.L.Barrett
- Bombycidendron Zoll. & Moritzi
- Cenocentrum Gagnep.
- Cravenia McLay & R.L.Barrett
- Decaschistia Wight & Arn.
- Dicellostyles Benth.
- Helicteropsis Hochr.
- Hibiscadelphus Rock
- Hibiscus L. (many synonyms
  including Fioria Mattei, Humbertianthus Hochr., Macrostelia Hochr., Symphyochlamys Gürke, Talipariti Fryxell)
- Humbertiella Hochr.
- Jumelleanthus Hochr.
- Julostylis Thwaites
- Kosteletzkya C.Presl
- Kydia Roxb.
- Malachra L.
- Malvaviscus Fabr.
- Megistostegium Hochr.
- Muenchhusia Heist. ex Fabr.
- Nayariophyton T.K.Paul
- Papuodendron C.T.White
- Pavonia Cav.
- Peltaea (C.Presl) Standl.
- Perrierophytum Hochr.
- Phragmocarpidium Krapov.
- Radyera Bullock
- Roifia Verdc.
- Rojasimalva Fryxell
- Sabdariffa (DC.) Kostel.
- Senra Cav.
- Thepparatia Phuph.
- Urena L.
- Wercklea Pittier & Standl.
- Woodianthus Krapov.
