= Megistostegium perrieri =

Conservation status
- Endangered (IUCN 3.1)

Scientific classification
- Kingdom: Plantae
- Clade: Tracheophytes
- Clade: Angiosperms
- Clade: Eudicots
- Clade: Rosids
- Order: Malvales
- Family: Malvaceae
- Genus: Megistostegium
- Species: M. perrieri

Binomial name
- Megistostegium perrieri Hochr.

Species of flowering plant

Megistostegium perrieri is a plant in the family Malvaceae. It is endemic to Madagascar.

== Description ==
Megistostegium perrieri grows as a shrub up to 1 metre (3 ft) tall. Its large leaves are orbicular to round in shape. They are coloured gray-green and measure up to 5.4 cm (2 in) long. The flowers are pendant with an epicalyx that matures to a deep maroon colour. The pollen is yellow when fresh.

== Distribution and habitat ==
Megistostegium perrieri is found only on the coastline of the Mahafaly Plateau of Toliara Province in southern Madagascar, including in the Special Reserve at Cape Sainte Marie. Its habitat is in rocky areas from sea level to about 500 m (1,600 ft) elevation.

== Conservation ==
Megistostegium perrieri has been assessed as endangered on the IUCN Red List. It is threatened by land conversion for agriculture, mining and forestry. It is also threatened by wildfires..

== Uses ==
The leaves of M. perrieri are locally used to treat coughs. The branches are sometimes used for decorative purposes.
