= Jumelleanthus =

Scientific classification
- Kingdom: Plantae
- Clade: Tracheophytes
- Clade: Angiosperms
- Clade: Eudicots
- Clade: Rosids
- Order: Malvales
- Family: Malvaceae
- Subfamily: Malvoideae
- Tribe: Hibisceae
- Genus: Jumelleanthus; Hochr. (1924)
- Species: J. perrieri

Binomial name
- Jumelleanthus perrieri Hochr.

Genus of plants

Jumelleanthus is a monotypic genus of flowering plants belonging to the family Malvaceae. It only contains one species, Jumelleanthus perrieri Hochr.

It is native to Madagascar.

The genus name of Jumelleanthus is in honour of Henri Lucien Jumelle (1866–1935), a French botanist and professor of botany at the Faculté des Sciences in Marseille. The Latin specific epithet of perrieri refers to botanist and plant collector in Madagascar, Joseph Marie Henry Alfred Perrier de la Bâthie. It was first described and published by Bénédict Pierre Georges Hochreutiner in Candollea Vol.2 on page 81 in 1924.
