= Macrocalyx =

Macrocalyx is a taxonomic plant genus synonym that may refer to:

- Macrocalyx Costantin & Poiss. = Megistostegium
- Macrocalyx Miers ex Lindl. = Psychotria
