= Humbertiella (plant) =

Scientific classification
- Kingdom: Plantae
- Clade: Tracheophytes
- Clade: Angiosperms
- Clade: Eudicots
- Clade: Rosids
- Order: Malvales
- Family: Malvaceae
- Tribe: Hibisceae
- Genus: Humbertiella; Hochr.

Synonyms
- Heterotypic: Neohumbertiella Hochr.

Genus of flowering plants

Humbertiella is a genus of plants, in the Malvaceae (mallow family) from Madagascar. The genus was named in 1926 for Jean-Henri Humbert (1887–1967), a French botanist and conservationist.

== Species ==
As of March 2023, the following species were accepted in Plants of the World Online:

1. Humbertiella decaryi (Hochr.) Dorr
2. Humbertiella foliosa (Hochr. & Humbert) Dorr
3. Humbertiella henricii Hochr.
4. Humbertiella quararibeoides Hochr.
5. Humbertiella sakamaliensis (Hochr.) Dorr
6. Humbertiella tormeyae Dorr
