= Olearia adenolasia =

Scientific classification
- Kingdom: Plantae
- Clade: Tracheophytes
- Clade: Angiosperms
- Clade: Eudicots
- Clade: Asterids
- Order: Asterales
- Family: Asteraceae
- Genus: Olearia
- Species: O. adenolasia

Binomial name
- Olearia adenolasia (F.Muell.) F.Muell. ex Benth.

Synonyms
- Aster adenolasius F.Muell.; Olearia adenolasia F.Muell. nom. inval., pro syn.; Olearia boorabbinensis Hochr.

Species of flowering plant

Olearia adenolasia, commonly known as woolly-glandular daisy-bush, is a species of flowering plant in the family Asteraceae. It is a small upright shrub with sticky leaves and blue-purple or white daisy flowers.

== Description ==
Olearia adenolasia is a fragrant, sticky, erect shrub to 50 cm (20 in) high with woody stems. Branches are glandular and have soft short silky hairs. The leaves are sessile, thickly arranged, narrow widening toward the tip, linear or broader at the base about 7–14 mm (0.28–0.55 in) long and 1–1.5 mm (0.039–0.059 in) wide. The dark green upper surface of leaves has a silky texture with numerous short thickly matted glandular hairs. The leaf underside has non-glandular soft cream hairs, an obscure mid-vein and rolled edges. The single floret consists of 9-15 small flowers at the apex of a branch on a short stalk. The bracts prior to the flower opening are bell-shaped and 7–9 mm (0.28–0.35 in) long. The white to blue-purple petals are narrow, widening at the tip and about 8 mm (0.31 in) long ending in a sharp point. The individual flowers have a yellow centre. The dry fruit are elliptical about 3 mm (0.12 in) long with 4-5 longitudinal ridges and contains a single seed. Flowers from August to November.

== Taxonomy and naming ==
This daisy bush was first formally described in 1865 by Ferdinand von Mueller who gave it the name Aster adenolasius in Fragmenta phytographiae Australiae. In 1867 George Bentham formalised the name Olearia adenolasia and the description was published in Flora Australiensis. The specific epithet (adenolasia) is derived from the Ancient Greek words aden meaning "gland" and lasios meaning "hairy", "woolly" or "shaggy".

== Distribution and habitat ==
Woolly-glandular daisy-bush grows in Western Australia near Coolgardie, Esperance plains, Kondinin and Ravensthorpe in sandy loam, sand over laterite and on sand hills.
