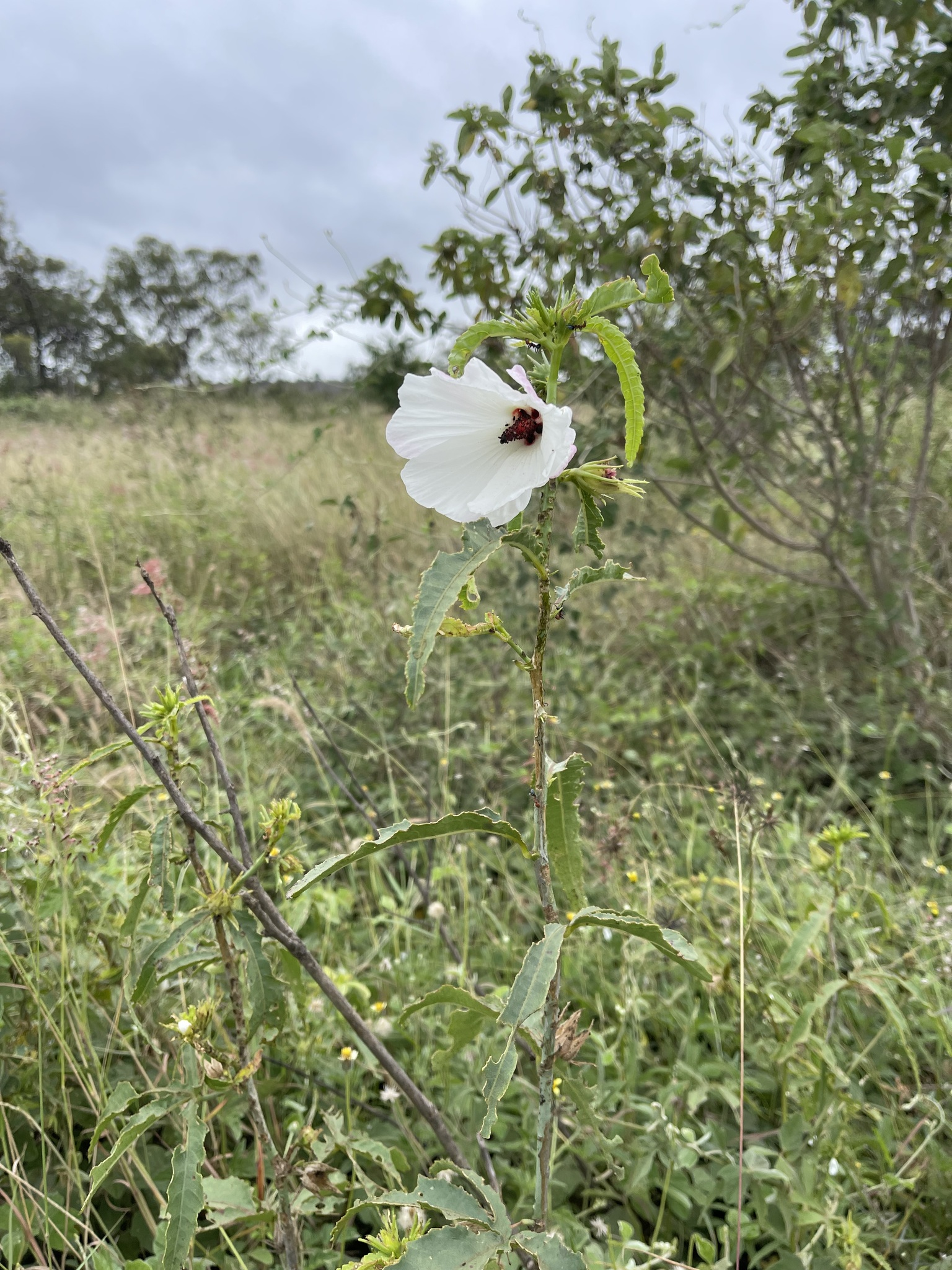

Scientific classification
- Kingdom: Plantae
- Clade: Embryophytes
- Clade: Tracheophytes
- Clade: Spermatophytes
- Clade: Angiosperms
- Clade: Eudicots
- Clade: Rosids
- Order: Malvales
- Family: Malvaceae
- Genus: Sabdariffa
- Species: S. meraukensis

Binomial name
- Sabdariffa meraukensis (Hochr.) McLay & R.L.Barrett

Synonyms
- Brockmania membranacea W.Fitzg.; Hibiscus meraukensis Hochr.

= Sabdariffa meraukensis =

Species of plant

Sabdariffa meraukensis is an annual flowering shrub in the cotton family Malvaceae, native to much of northern Australia from Western Australia to Queensland, as well as Timor and Merauke, South Papua, Indonesia from where the type specimen was collected.

It grows annually, typically sprouting after the wet season in Northern Australia and dying off in the dry season, re-sprouting from seed the following year. It is relatively small compared to other species in the same genus, rarely reaching 1 metre (3 ft 3 in) in height.

== Description ==
=== Leaves ===
Leaves are hairy when young and large (up to 18 cm (7.1 in) long by 10 cm (3.9 in) wide). Leaf shape is variable with both lobed and unlobed leaves being found on the same plant. Usually one or more slit-like nectaries near the base of the midrib. Leaves are typically scabrous on both sides.

=== Flowers ===
The flowers are typically around 10 cm (3.9 in) in diameter. They are generally white or pale pink with a crimson core. The flowers are short-lived, only being fully open for a few days, however new flowers will continue to open for an extended period if there is sufficient water.

=== Fruit ===
Flowers are followed by a spiked seed capsule containing several segmented compartments of seeds, similar in appearance to other members of the Hibiscus genus.

== Distribution and habitat ==
Hibiscus meraukensis is found in the Australian states of Western Australia, The Northern Territory and Queensland, as well as Timor and the Merauke region of South Papua (Indonesia) and neighbouring Papua New Guinea. It grows in a wide range of habitats, including coastal vine thickets, riparian areas, Melaleuca forests, savannahs and shrublands.
