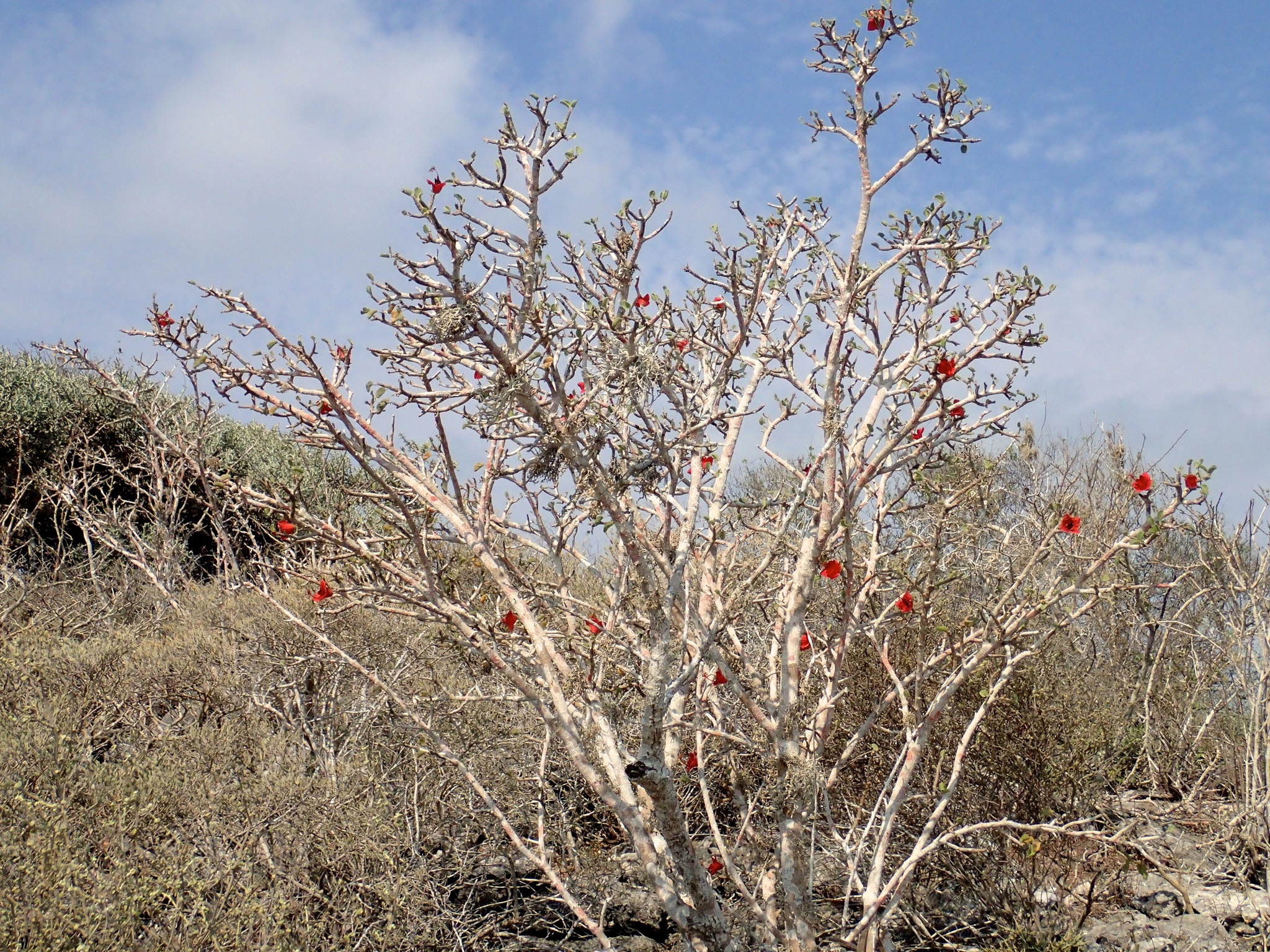
- In Atsimo-Andrefana region

Conservation status
- Least Concern (IUCN 3.1)

Scientific classification
- Kingdom: Plantae
- Clade: Tracheophytes
- Clade: Angiosperms
- Clade: Eudicots
- Clade: Rosids
- Order: Malvales
- Family: Malvaceae
- Genus: Megistostegium
- Species: M. nodulosum

Binomial name
- Megistostegium nodulosum (Drake) Hochr.

Synonyms
- Hibiscus nodulosus Drake; Macrocalyx tomentosa Costantin & Poiss.; Megistostegium retusum Hochr.

= Megistostegium nodulosum =

Species of tree

Megistostegium nodulosum is a tree in the family Malvaceae. It is endemic to Madagascar.

== Description ==
Megistostegium nodulosum grows as a tree up to 8 metres (30 ft) tall. Its thin leaves are orbicular in shape. They are coloured gray-green and measure up to 4 cm (2 in) long. The flowers are erect with a light pink to red epicalyx and a red to pink corolla. The pollen is yellow when fresh.

== Distribution and habitat ==
Megistostegium nodulosum is found at numerous locations throughout southern Madagascar, including in protected areas. Its habitat is forests from sea level to about 500 m (1,600 ft) altitude.

== Conservation ==
Megistostegium nodulosum has been assessed as least concern on the IUCN Red List. There are some threats to the species such as from agriculture, mining and wildfires, but these are not yet considered significant threats to mature plants. Megistostegium nodulosum is present in a number of protected areas, including Andohahela National Park and Cap Sainte-Marie Special Reserve.

== Uses ==
Megistostegium nodulosum is locally used in home construction and as charcoal. The bark, leaves and twigs are locally used to treat conditions including eye ailments and stomach aches.
