= Taurella forresti =

Scientific classification
- Kingdom: Animalia
- Phylum: Arthropoda
- Clade: Pancrustacea
- Class: Insecta
- Order: Hemiptera
- Suborder: Auchenorrhyncha
- Family: Cicadidae
- Genus: Taurella
- Species: T. forresti

Binomial name
- Taurella forresti (Distant, 1882)

Synonyms
- Melampsalta forresti Distant, 1882; Melampsalta warburtoni Distant, 1882; Cicadetta forresti (Distant, 1882); Melampsalta capistrata Ashton, 1912; Cicadetta capistrata (Ashton, 1912)

Species of cicada

Taurella forresti is a species of cicada, also known as the hibiscus cicada, in the true cicada family, Cicadettinae subfamily and Cicadettini tribe. The species is endemic to Australia. It was described in 1882 by English entomologist William Lucas Distant.

== Description ==
The length of the forewing is 15–22 mm.

== Distribution and habitat ==
The species occurs in eastern Australia, coastally and sub-coastally, from Cooktown in Far North Queensland southwards to Taree in New South Wales. The associated habitats include tropical and subtropical rainforest, riparian vegetation and gardens, especially with hibiscus species such as Hibiscus tiliaceus and Hibiscus heterophyllus.

== Behaviour ==
Adult males may be heard from September to April, clinging to the stems of shrubs, emitting calls characterised by short, high-pitched "ziits" followed by a longer, continuous hiss.
