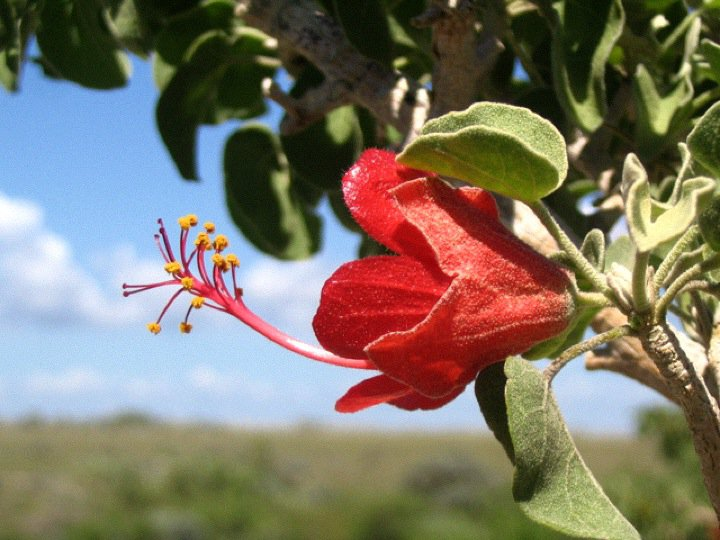

Scientific classification
- Kingdom: Plantae
- Clade: Tracheophytes
- Clade: Angiosperms
- Clade: Eudicots
- Clade: Rosids
- Order: Malvales
- Family: Malvaceae
- Genus: Megistostegium
- Species: M. microphyllum

Binomial name
- Megistostegium microphyllum Hochr.

= Megistostegium microphyllum =

Species of flowering plant

Megistostegium microphyllum is a plant in the family Malvaceae. It is endemic to Madagascar.

== Description ==
Megistostegium microphyllum grows as a shrub up to 4 metres (13 ft) tall. Its glabrous leaves are orbicular to elliptical in shape. They are coloured gray-green to bright green and measure up to 1.8 cm (1 in) long. The flowers are erect with an orange to red epicalyx and a light green to light pink corolla. The pollen is purple when fresh.

== Distribution and habitat ==
Megistostegium microphyllum is found at numerous locations throughout southern Madagascar, including in protected areas. Its habitat is forests from sea level to about 500 m (1,600 ft) altitude.

== Threats ==
Threats to Megistostegium in general include grazing by goats, invasive plants competing for limited water supplies and the possible extinction of pollinators. The preliminary conservation status of M. microphyllum is Vulnerable.

== Uses ==
The bark, leaves and twigs of M. microphyllum are locally used to treat conditions including eye ailments and stomach aches. The branches are sometimes used for decorative purposes.
