= Perrierophytum =

Scientific classification
- Kingdom: Plantae
- Clade: Tracheophytes
- Clade: Angiosperms
- Clade: Eudicots
- Clade: Rosids
- Order: Malvales
- Family: Malvaceae
- Subfamily: Malvoideae
- Tribe: Hibisceae
- Genus: Perrierophytum; Hochr.

Synonyms
- Perrieranthus Hochr.

Genus of flowering plant

Perrierophytum is a genus of flowering plants belonging to the family Malvaceae.

It is native to Mozambique and Madagascar.

The genus name of Perrierophytum is in honour of Joseph Marie Henry Alfred Perrier de la Bâthie (1873–1958), a French botanist who specialized in the plants of Madagascar. It was first described and published in Annuaire Conserv. Jard. Bot. Genève Vols.18-19 on page 229 in 1915.

== Known species ==
According to Kew:

- Perrierophytum glomeratum Hochr.
- Perrierophytum hispidum (Hochr.) Hochr.
- Perrierophytum humbertianthus Hochr.
- Perrierophytum humbertii Hochr.
- Perrierophytum luteum Hochr.
- Perrierophytum paniculatum Hochr.
- Perrierophytum rubrum Hochr.
- Perrierophytum viridiflorum Hochr.
- Perrierophytum viscosum Hochr.
