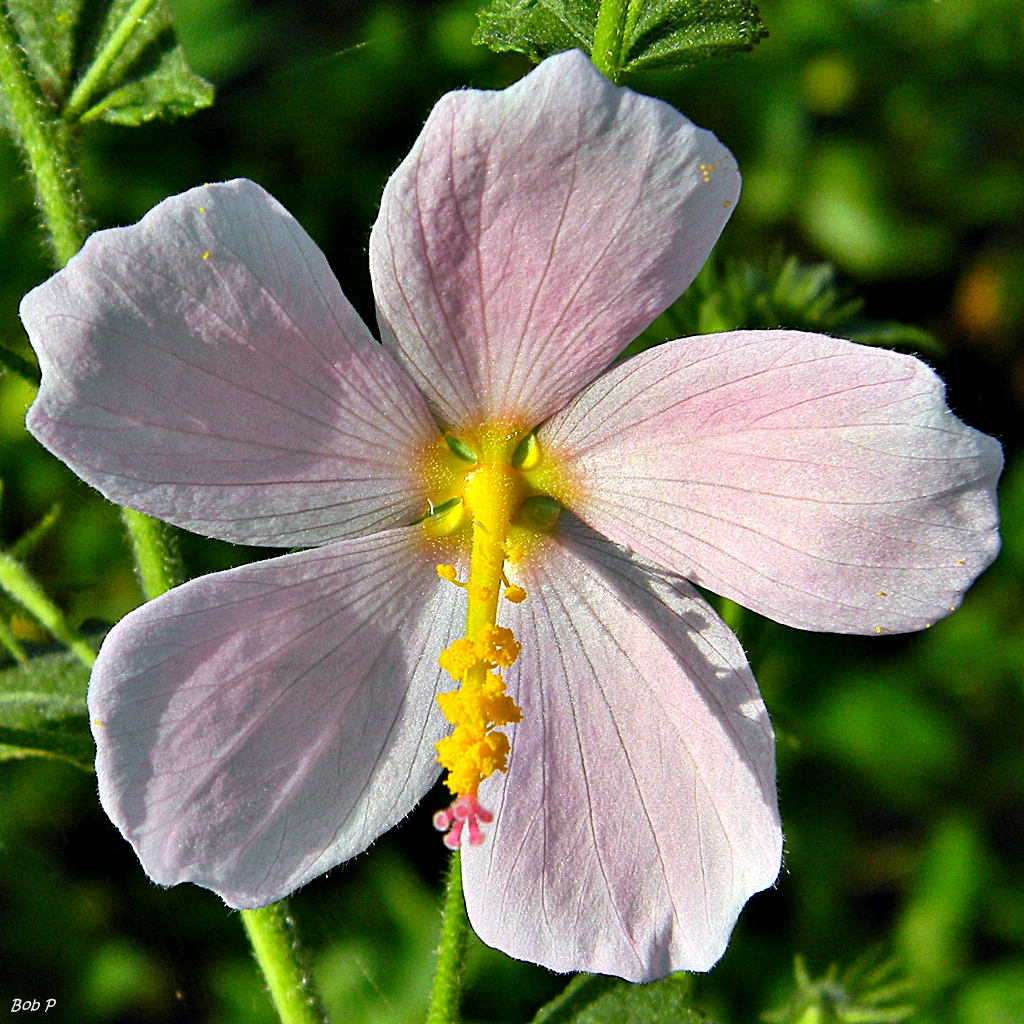

Conservation status
- Least Concern (IUCN 3.1)

Scientific classification
- Kingdom: Plantae
- Clade: Tracheophytes
- Clade: Angiosperms
- Clade: Eudicots
- Clade: Rosids
- Order: Malvales
- Family: Malvaceae
- Genus: Kosteletzkya
- Species: K. pentacarpos

Binomial name
- Kosteletzkya pentacarpos (L.) Ledeb.

Synonyms
- Kosteletzkya virginica K. Presl ex Gray; Kosteletzkya pentacarpa

= Kosteletzkya pentacarpos =

Seashore mallow

Species of aquatic plant

Kosteletzkya pentacarpos, the seashore mallow, also known as the saltmarsh mallow, sweat weed, Virginia saltmarsh mallow, or hibiscus à cinq carpelles, is an herb found in marshes along the eastern seashore of North America, parts of coastal Southern Europe, southwestern Russia, and Western Asia.

== Taxonomy ==
This flowering plant is in family Malvaceae of the order Malvales. Populations in North America were previously known as Kosteletzkya virginica to distinguish them from the Eurasian K. pentacarpos, but both species were merged in 2008 due being morphologically identical to one another.

== Description ==
The pink-flowered seashore mallow is both a perennial and a halophyte, or salt-tolerant plant, that grows in areas where other plants cannot. The plant can grow to above 1 metre in height, the leaves are 6–14 cm long, cordate to lanceolate with toothed margins. The stems and leaves are hairy. Flowers are 5–8 cm across, with 5 petals surrounding a tube consisting of the fused stamens and style. It blooms from July to October with pale to deep pink flowers. It is occasionally planted in gardens.

== Distribution ==
This species is found throughout much of the Atlantic and Gulf coastlines of eastern North America, from New York south to Cuba, east to Bermuda, and west to Texas. It also has a fragmented distribution along the Mediterranean shoreline of southern Europe, including parts of coastal Spain & Italy, the Balearic Islands, and Corsica. Populations in northern Italy are thought to be introduced. One very small population is known from Georgia, on the coast of the Black Sea. It is also found along the western and southern shorelines of the Caspian Sea in Iran and Azerbaijan. This species is also found along the Volga and Don Rivers in southwestern Russia, but it is unknown whether these populations have natural origins.

== Threats ==
While this species is common throughout its North American range, populations in Eurasia are rare and have been severely fragmented by agricultural and urban development, and over the past few decades it has been lost from many localities where it was previously known.

== Uses ==
In ancient Transcaucasia, K. pentacarpos and Hibiscus ponticus were abundant enough to be harvested in large numbers for their strong stem fibers, which were useful for making ropes and nets. In addition, studies indicate that K. pentacarpos is a potentially useful species for phytoremediation of saline soils polluted by metalloids, and can also facilitate the transition of coastal agricultural land to wetlands following sea level rise.
