= Papuodendron =

Scientific classification
- Kingdom: Plantae
- Clade: Tracheophytes
- Clade: Angiosperms
- Clade: Eudicots
- Clade: Rosids
- Order: Malvales
- Family: Malvaceae
- Subfamily: Malvoideae
- Tribe: Hibisceae
- Genus: Papuodendron; C.T.White

Type species
- Papuodendron lepidotum C.T.White

Genus of flowering plants

Papuodendron is a genus of flowering plants belonging to the family Malvaceae. In 1946 Cyril Tenison White described its first species, Papuodendron lepidotum, which was discovered growing in 1944 in the Mandated Territory of New Guinea. Its native range is New Guinea.

== Description ==
Papuodendron is an arborescent genus, i.e. plants are tree-like.

== Taxonomy ==
=== Higher classification ===
The type species, Papuodendron lepidotum, was provisionally classified as a new species of Cumingia by Ulbricht, but was formally described as belonging to the then new genus of Papuodendron by White. The higher classification of Papuodendron has been revised over time. White originally placed Papuodendron within the family Bombacaceae, but noted similarities to both the family Bombacaceae and the tribe Hibisceae: Papuodendron is similar to the Bombacaceae in the arrangement of the anthers, but similar to the Hibisceae in that the medullary rays do not feature tile cells, a type of ray cell found within the wood of some trees, which are a feature of the Bombacaceae. White's placement of Papuodendron within the Bombacaceae was known to be problematic given its similarities to the Hibisceae, and in 1960 André Joseph Guillaume Henri Kostermans reduced the genus to Hibiscus, thus transferring it to the Hibisceae. In 1966, Jan van Borssum Waalkes returned Papuodendron to the Bombacaceae, albeit hesitantly. In 2000, phylogenetic analysis showed Papuodendron to be within the Malviodeae, and that it was a sister genus to Hibiscus, thus supporting the placement of the genus within the Hibisceae. By 2004, it was settled that Papuodendron belongs to the Malvaceae (within the subfamily Malvoideae) rather than the Bombacaceae.

=== Distinction from Hibiscus ===
In 1960, when Kostermans transferred Papuodendron from the family Bombacaceae to the family Malveaceae, he also reduced the genus to Hibiscus on the basis the only difference between the two genera was the position of the anthers, which he considered insufficient to differentiate them. In 1972, Wilhelmus Albertus van Heel supported Kostermans's reduction of Papuodendron to Hibiscus on the basis of anatomical studies showing insufficient differences to support Papuodendron being considered a different genus. The 2000 phylogenetic analysis placing Papuodendron within the Hibisceae did not directly address whether it is a distinct genus. As of 2022, there is ongoing debate as to whether Papuodendron is a distinct genus from Hibiscus: Plants of the World Online considers them distinct genera, but notes that Maarten J. M. Christenhusz et al. cite Papuodendron as Hibiscus.

== Species ==
As of 2022, Plants of the World Online lists the genus as comprising two species:

- Papuodendron hooglandianum (Kosterm.) Borss.Waalk. – first described in 1960 as a species of Hibiscus, and reclassified as a species of Papuodendron in 1966
- Papuodendron lepidotum C.T.White – first described in 1946
