= Hochreutinera =

Scientific classification
- Kingdom: Plantae
- Clade: Embryophytes
- Clade: Tracheophytes
- Clade: Angiosperms
- Clade: Eudicots
- Clade: Rosids
- Order: Malvales
- Family: Malvaceae
- Genus: Hochreutinera; Krapov.

Genus of plants

Hochreutinera is a genus of flowering plants belonging to the family Malvaceae.

Its native range is in Central and South America. It is found in the countries of Argentina, Brazil, Costa Rica, El Salvador, Guatemala, Mexico and Paraguay.

The genus name of Hochreutinera is in honour of Bénédict Pierre Georges Hochreutiner (1873–1959), a Swiss botanist and plant taxonomist. It was described and published in Darwiniana Vol.16 on page 225 in 1970.

Known species, according to Kew:

- Hochreutinera amplexifolia (DC.) Fryxell
- Hochreutinera hassleriana (Hochr.) Krapov.
