= Taurella viridis =

Scientific classification
- Kingdom: Animalia
- Phylum: Arthropoda
- Clade: Pancrustacea
- Class: Insecta
- Order: Hemiptera
- Suborder: Auchenorrhyncha
- Family: Cicadidae
- Genus: Taurella
- Species: T. viridis

Binomial name
- Taurella viridis (Ashton, 1912)

Synonyms
- Melampsalta viridis Ashton, 1912; Cicadetta viridis (Ashton, 1912)

Species of cicada

Taurella viridis is a species of cicada, also known as the emerald fairy, in the true cicada family, Cicadettinae subfamily and Cicadettini tribe. The species is endemic to Australia. It was described in 1912 by Australian entomologist Julian Howard Ashton.

== Description ==
The length of the forewing is 15–20 mm.

== Distribution and habitat ==
The species occurs across much of northern Australia. Associated habitats include grassy and riparian woodlands with thickets of shrubs, especially Grewia retusifolia.

== Behaviour ==
Adult males may be heard from November to February, clinging to the stems of small shrubs and grasses, emitting high-pitched buzzing and pulsing calls.
