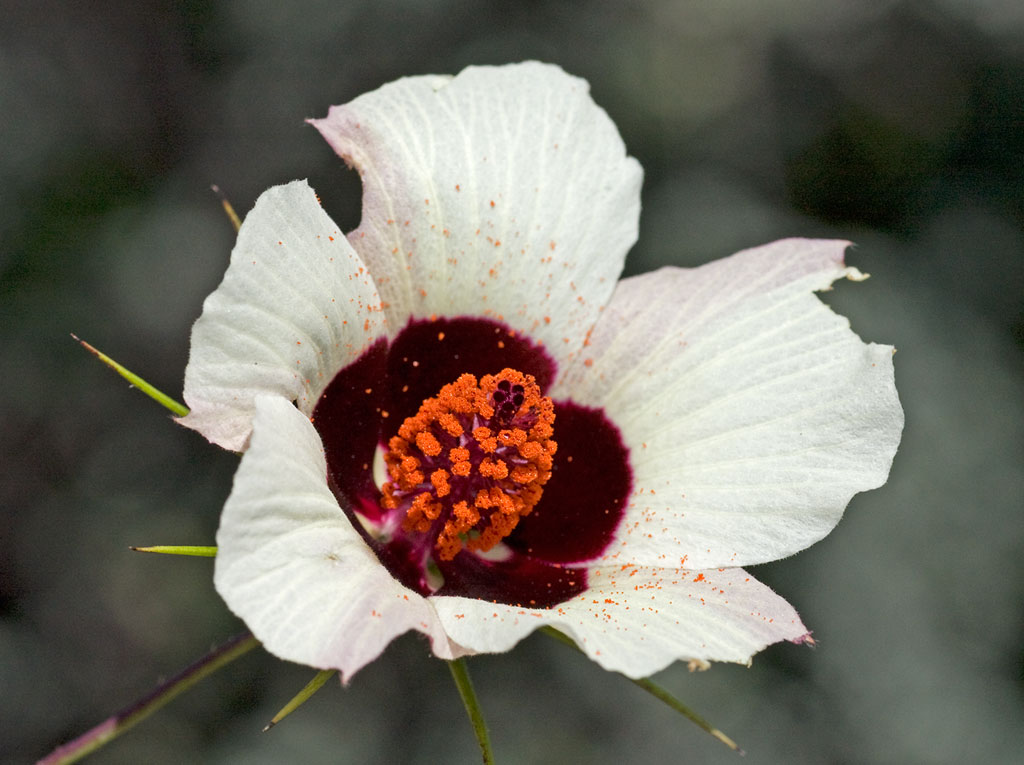

Scientific classification
- Kingdom: Plantae
- Clade: Tracheophytes
- Clade: Angiosperms
- Clade: Eudicots
- Clade: Rosids
- Order: Malvales
- Family: Malvaceae
- Subfamily: Malvoideae
- Tribe: Hibisceae
- Genus: Astrohibiscus; McLay & R.L.Barrett
- Species: A. caesius

Binomial name
- Astrohibiscus caesius (Garcke) McLay & R.L.Barrett

Synonyms
- Abelmoschus adscendens (G.Don) Walp.; Hibiscus adscendens G.Don; Hibiscus ascendens Walp., orth. var.; Hibiscus caesius Garcke (1849) (species basionym); Hibiscus caesius var. genuinus Hochr., not validly publ.; Hibiscus caesius var. micropetalus Gürke; Hibiscus gibsonii Stocks ex Harv.; Hibiscus heterotrichus E.Mey. ex Harv., not validly publ.; Hibiscus pentaphyllus F.Muell., nom illeg.

= Astrohibiscus =

Genus of flowering plants

Astrohibiscus is a genus of flowering plants in the family Malvaceae. It includes a single species, Astrohibiscus caesius, a shrub native to southern tropical Africa and the Indian subcontinent.

The species is native to southern tropical Africa, ranging from southwestern Tanzania to Angola and the Northern Provinces of South Africa, as well as India and Pakistan.

The species was first described as Hibiscus caesius by Christian August Friedrich Garcke in 1849. In 2024 Todd McLay and Russell Lindsay Barrett placed the species in the newly described monotypic genus Astrohibiscus as Astrohibiscus caesius.
