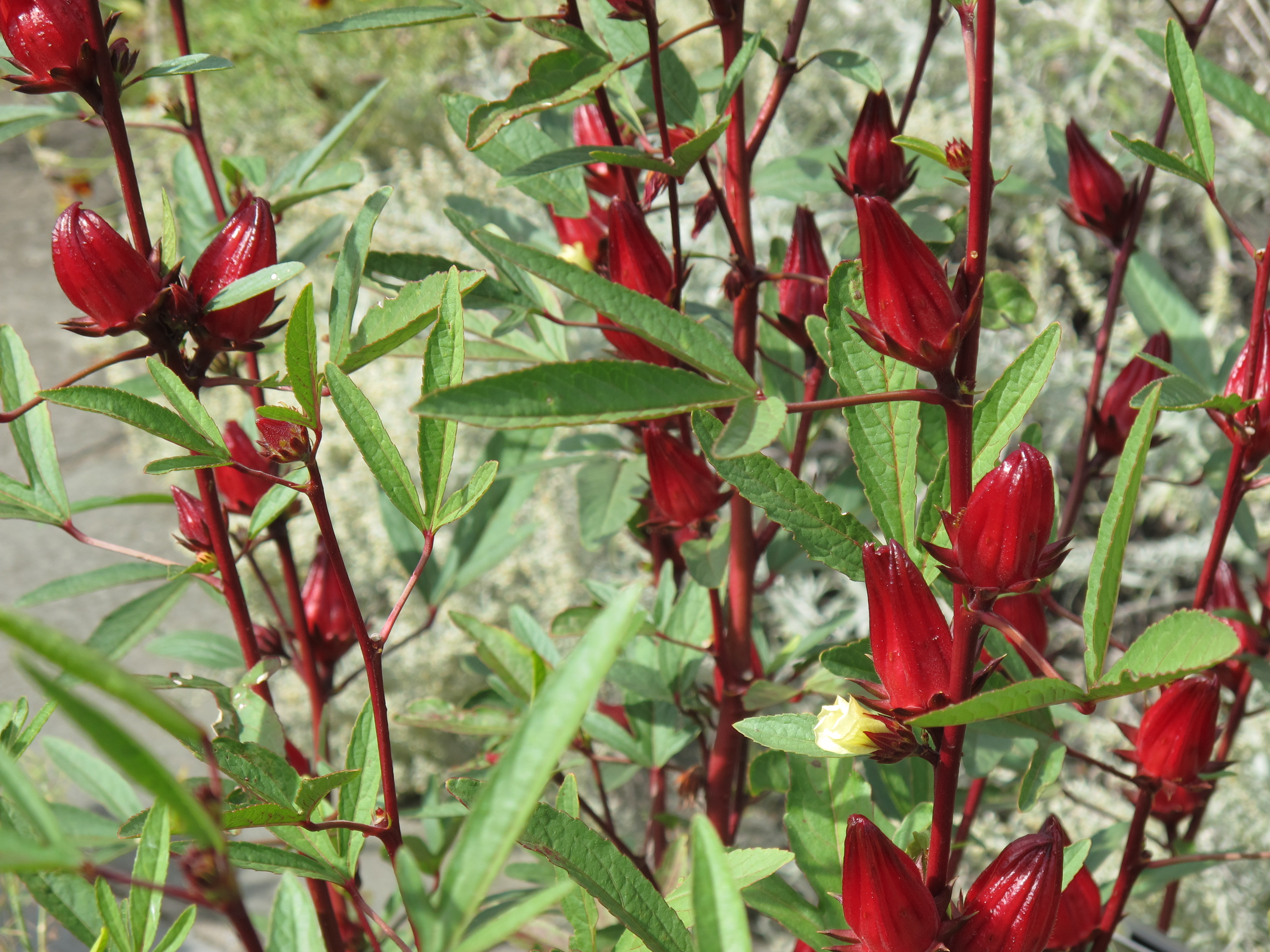
- Sabdariffa gossypiifolia

Scientific classification
- Kingdom: Plantae
- Clade: Embryophytes
- Clade: Tracheophytes
- Clade: Spermatophytes
- Clade: Angiosperms
- Clade: Eudicots
- Clade: Rosids
- Order: Malvales
- Family: Malvaceae
- Subfamily: Malvoideae
- Tribe: Hibisceae
- Genus: Sabdariffa (DC.) Kostel.

Synonyms
- Furcaria (DC.) Kostel., nom. illeg. homonym. post.

= Sabdariffa =

Genus of flowering plants

Sabdariffa is a genus of flowering plants in the family Malvaceae. It includes 117 species with a wide global distribution across the tropics and subtropics.

The genus was reinstated in 2025 after genus Hibiscus was found to be polyphyletic, and comprises the former Hibiscus section Furcaria.

== Species ==
117 species are accepted.

- Sabdariffa acetosella (Welw. ex Hiern) M.M.Hanes & R.L.Barrett
- Sabdariffa aculeata (Walter) M.M.Hanes & R.L.Barrett
- Sabdariffa adscensionis (Fryxell & Krapov.) M.C.Duarte & V.N.Yoshik.
- Sabdariffa altissima (Hornby) Mwachala & R.L.Barrett
- Sabdariffa amambayensis (Krapov. & Fryxell) M.C.Duarte & V.N.Yoshik.
- Sabdariffa andersonii (Krapov. & Fryxell) M.C.Duarte & V.N.Yoshik.
- Sabdariffa aneuthe (Craven, F.D.Wilson & Fryxell) McLay & R.L.Barrett
- Sabdariffa aphela (Craven, F.D.Wilson & Fryxell) McLay & R.L.Barrett
- Sabdariffa arnhemensis (F.D.Wilson) McLay & R.L.Barrett
- Sabdariffa aspera (Hook.f.) Mwachala & R.L.Barrett
- Sabdariffa australensis (Fosberg) R.L.Barrett & M.M.Hanes
- Sabdariffa bacalusia (Craven, F.D.Wilson & Fryxell) McLay & R.L.Barrett
- Sabdariffa benensis (Fryxell & Krapov.) M.C.Duarte & V.N.Yoshik.
- Sabdariffa berberidifolia (A.Rich.) Mwachala & R.L.Barrett
- Sabdariffa bifurcata (Cav.) M.C.Duarte & V.N.Yoshik.
- Sabdariffa brackenridgei (A.Gray) M.M.Hanes & R.L.Barrett
- Sabdariffa byrnesii (F.D.Wilson) McLay & R.L.Barrett
- Sabdariffa cannabina (L.) M.M.Hanes & R.L.Barrett
- Sabdariffa capitalensis (Krapov. & Fryxell) M.C.Duarte & V.N.Yoshik.
- Sabdariffa ceratophora (Thulin) Mwachala & R.L.Barrett
- Sabdariffa chancoae (Krapov. & Fryxell) M.C.Duarte & R.L.Barrett
- Sabdariffa chapadensis (Krapov. & Fryxell) M.C.Duarte & V.N.Yoshik.
- Sabdariffa commixta (Fryxell & Krapov.) M.C.Duarte & V.N.Yoshik.
- Sabdariffa conceptionis (Fryxell & Krapov.) M.C.Duarte & V.N.Yoshik.
- Sabdariffa cordofana (Turcz.) Mwachala & R.L.Barrett
- Sabdariffa costata (A.Rich.) M.M.Hanes & R.L.Barrett
- Sabdariffa cuanzensis (Exell & Mendonça) Mwachala & R.L.Barrett
- Sabdariffa cucurbitacea (A.St.-Hil.) M.C.Duarte & V.N.Yoshik.
- Sabdariffa cummingii (Wannan) R.L.Barrett & McLay
- Sabdariffa divaricata (Graham) McLay & R.L.Barrett
- Sabdariffa diversifolia (Jacq.) McLay & R.L.Barrett
- Sabdariffa elongatifolia (Hochr.) Mwachala & R.L.Barrett
- Sabdariffa fabiana (Cheek) Mwachala & R.L.Barrett
- Sabdariffa fallax (Craven, F.D.Wilson & Fryxell) McLay & R.L.Barrett
- Sabdariffa ferreirae (Fryxell & Krapov.) M.C.Duarte & V.N.Yoshik.
- Sabdariffa fijiensis (F.D.Wilson) M.M.Hanes & R.L.Barrett
- Sabdariffa flagelliformis (A.St.-Hil.) M.C.Duarte & V.N.Yoshik.
- Sabdariffa flavorosea (Baker f.) Mwachala & R.L.Barrett
- Sabdariffa forsteri (F.D.Wilson) McLay & R.L.Barrett
- Sabdariffa fryxellii (Mabb.) McLay & R.L.Barrett
- Sabdariffa furcata (Willd.) M.M.Hanes & R.L.Barrett
- Sabdariffa furcellata (Lam.) M.M.Hanes & R.L.Barrett
- Sabdariffa furcellatoides (Hochr.) Mwachala & R.L.Barrett
- Sabdariffa gilletii (De Wild.) Mwachala & R.L.Barrett
- Sabdariffa goossensii (Hauman) Mwachala & R.L.Barrett
- Sabdariffa gossypiifolia (Mill.) M.M.Hanes & R.L.Barrett
- Sabdariffa granitica (Wannan) McLay & R.L.Barrett
- Sabdariffa greenwayi (Baker f.) Mwachala & R.L.Barrett
- Sabdariffa gregoryi (Krapov. & Fryxell) M.C.Duarte & V.N.Yoshik.
- Sabdariffa hassleriana (Hochr.) M.C.Duarte & V.N.Yoshik.
- Sabdariffa henningsiana (Gürke) M.C.Duarte & V.N.Yoshik.
- Sabdariffa heterophylla (Vent.) McLay & R.L.Barrett
- Sabdariffa hilariana (Krapov. & Fryxell) M.C.Duarte & V.N.Yoshik.
- Sabdariffa hispidissima (Griff.) R.L.Barrett & M.M.Hanes
- Sabdariffa hochreutineri (Krapov. & Fryxell) M.C.Duarte & V.N.Yoshik.
- Sabdariffa holstii (Mwachala) Mwachala & R.L.Barrett
- Sabdariffa hoshiarpurensis (T.K.Paul & M.P.Nayar) R.L.Barrett & M.M.Hanes
- Sabdariffa inimica (Craven, F.D.Wilson & Fryxell) McLay & R.L.Barrett
- Sabdariffa itirapinensis (Krapov. & Fryxell) M.C.Duarte & V.N.Yoshik.
- Sabdariffa kenneallyi (Craven, F.D.Wilson & Fryxell) McLay & R.L.Barrett
- Sabdariffa kirstyae (Craven) McLay & R.L.Barrett
- Sabdariffa kitaibelifolia (A.St.-Hil.) M.C.Duarte & V.N.Yoshik.
- Sabdariffa laxiflora (A.St.-Hil.) M.C.Duarte & V.N.Yoshik.
- Sabdariffa maculata (Lam.) M.M.Hanes & R.L.Barrett
- Sabdariffa manuripiensis (Krapov.) M.C.Duarte & V.N.Yoshik.
- Sabdariffa marenitensis (Craven, F.D.Wilson & Fryxell) McLay & R.L.Barrett
- Sabdariffa mariae (Krapov.) M.C.Duarte & V.N.Yoshik.
- Sabdariffa mastersiana (Hiern) Mwachala & R.L.Barrett
- Sabdariffa matogrossensis (Krapov. & Fryxell) M.C.Duarte & V.N.Yoshik.
- Sabdariffa mechowii (Garcke) Mwachala & R.L.Barrett
- Sabdariffa menzeliae (F.D.Wilson & Byrnes) McLay & R.L.Barrett
- Sabdariffa meraukensis (Hochr.) McLay & R.L.Barrett
- Sabdariffa minkebeensis (Burg) Mwachala & R.L.Barrett
- Sabdariffa minutibracteola (F.D.Wilson) McLay & R.L.Barrett
- Sabdariffa mollis (Craven, F.D.Wilson & Fryxell) McLay & R.L.Barrett
- Sabdariffa moxicoensis (Baker f.) Mwachala & R.L.Barrett
- Sabdariffa multiformis (A.St.-Hil.) M.C.Duarte & V.N.Yoshik.
- Sabdariffa nanuzae (Krapov. & Fryxell) M.C.Duarte & V.N.Yoshik.
- Sabdariffa ngokbanakii (Burg) Mwachala & R.L.Barrett
- Sabdariffa nigricaulis (Baker f.) Mwachala & R.L.Barrett
- Sabdariffa noldeae (Baker f.) Mwachala & R.L.Barrett
- Sabdariffa paludicola (Fryxell & Krapov.) M.C.Duarte & V.N.Yoshik.
- Sabdariffa paolii (Mattei) Mwachala & R.L.Barrett
- Sabdariffa partita (Hochr.) M.M.Hanes & R.L.Barrett
- Sabdariffa peruviana (R.E.Fr.) M.C.Duarte & R.L.Barrett
- Sabdariffa petherickii (Craven, F.D.Wilson & Fryxell) McLay & R.L.Barrett
- Sabdariffa pohlii (Gürke) M.C.Duarte & V.N.Yoshik.
- Sabdariffa radiata (Cav.) R.L.Barrett & M.M.Hanes
- Sabdariffa reekmansii (F.D.Wilson) Mwachala & R.L.Barrett
- Sabdariffa reflexa (Craven, F.D.Wilson & Fryxell) McLay & R.L.Barrett
- Sabdariffa riceae (Craven, F.D.Wilson & Fryxell) McLay & R.L.Barrett
- Sabdariffa rostellata (Guill. & Perr.) Mwachala & R.L.Barrett
- Sabdariffa saddii (Krapov. & Fryxell) M.C.Duarte & V.N.Yoshik.
- Sabdariffa sankowskyorum (Craven) McLay & R.L.Barrett
- Sabdariffa saponaria (Craven) McLay & R.L.Barrett
- Sabdariffa scabricaulis (Helwig) M.M.Hanes & R.L.Barrett
- Sabdariffa scotellii (Baker f.) Mwachala & R.L.Barrett
- Sabdariffa sebastianii (Fuertes) M.C.Duarte & V.N.Yoshik.
- Sabdariffa sineaculeata (F.D.Wilson) Mwachala & R.L.Barrett
- Sabdariffa sparseaculeata (Baker f.) Mwachala & R.L.Barrett
- Sabdariffa splendens (C.Fraser ex Graham) McLay & R.L.Barrett
- Sabdariffa squarrulosa (Craven, F.D.Wilson & Fryxell) McLay & R.L.Barrett
- Sabdariffa stewartii (Craven, F.D.Wilson & Fryxell) McLay & R.L.Barrett
- Sabdariffa subdiversifolia (Hochr.) M.M.Hanes & R.L.Barrett
- Sabdariffa sudanensis (Hochr.) Mwachala & R.L.Barrett
- Sabdariffa superba (C.A.Gardner) McLay & R.L.Barrett
- Sabdariffa surattensis (L.) M.M.Hanes & R.L.Barrett
- Sabdariffa symonii (F.D.Wilson & Byrnes) McLay & R.L.Barrett
- Sabdariffa thegalea (Craven, F.D.Wilson & Fryxell) McLay & R.L.Barrett
- Sabdariffa torrei (Baker f.) Mwachala & R.L.Barrett
- Sabdariffa townsvillensis (Craven) McLay & R.L.Barrett
- Sabdariffa trilineata (A.St.-Hil. & Naudin) M.C.Duarte & V.N.Yoshik.
- Sabdariffa uncinella (Moc. & Sessé ex DC.) M.M.Hanes & R.L.Barrett
- Sabdariffa verrucosa (Guill. & Perr.) Mwachala & R.L.Barrett
- Sabdariffa wilsonii (Fryxell) M.C.Duarte & V.N.Yoshik.
- Sabdariffa windischii (Krapov. & Fryxell) M.C.Duarte & V.N.Yoshik.
- Sabdariffa zonata (F.Muell.) McLay & R.L.Barrett
