= Taurella froggatti =

Scientific classification
- Kingdom: Animalia
- Phylum: Arthropoda
- Clade: Pancrustacea
- Class: Insecta
- Order: Hemiptera
- Suborder: Auchenorrhyncha
- Family: Cicadidae
- Genus: Taurella
- Species: T. froggatti

Binomial name
- Taurella froggatti (Distant, 1907)

Synonyms
- Melampsalta froggatti Distant, 1907; Melampsalta sulcata Distant, 1907; Cicadetta froggatti (Distant, 1907); Cicadetta sulcata (Distant, 1907)

Species of cicada

Taurella froggatti is a species of cicada, also known as the red fairy, in the true cicada family, Cicadettinae subfamily and Cicadettini tribe. The species is endemic to Australia. It was described in 1907 by English entomologist William Lucas Distant.

== Description ==
The length of the forewing is 15–19 mm.

== Distribution and habitat ==
The species occurs in Far North Queensland from Cape York southwards to Tully and Georgetown. Associated habitats include tropical grassland and grassy woodland, usually near water.

== Behaviour ==
Adult males may be heard from December to February, clinging to the stems of grasses, emitting high-pitched buzzing and pulsing calls.
