= Papuodendron lepidotum =

Scientific classification
- Kingdom: Plantae
- Clade: Tracheophytes
- Clade: Angiosperms
- Clade: Eudicots
- Clade: Rosids
- Order: Malvales
- Family: Malvaceae
- Genus: Papuodendron
- Species: P. lepidotum

Binomial name
- Papuodendron lepidotum C.T.White

Synonyms
- Hibiscus papuodendron Kosterm.

Species of rainforest tree

Papuodendron lepidotum (Common name Saping Ningi) is a rainforest tree endemic to New Guinea that belongs to the family Malvaceae. It is sometimes lumped with Hibiscus as Hibiscus lepidotum and as such, at 140 feet (43 meters) is by far the tallest of the Hibiscuses. It is relatively slender at two foot (61 cm ) D.B.H. (diameter at breast height) Leaves are ovate or lanceo-ovate. Fruit is a five-parted dry capsule about 1.5 inch (4 centimeters) long by 1.25 inches (3.2 cm) in width.
