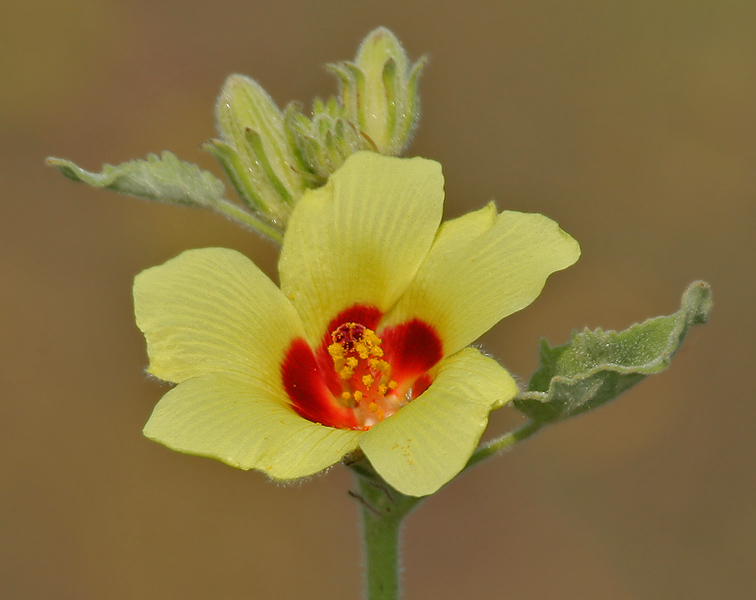
- Cravenia panduriformis

Scientific classification
- Kingdom: Plantae
- Clade: Tracheophytes
- Clade: Angiosperms
- Clade: Eudicots
- Clade: Rosids
- Order: Malvales
- Family: Malvaceae
- Subfamily: Malvoideae
- Tribe: Hibisceae
- Genus: Cravenia; McLay & R.L.Barrett

= Cravenia =

Genus of flowering plants

Cravenia is a genus of flowering plants in the family Malvaceae. It includes six species native to tropical Africa, the Indian subcontinent, Sulawesi, the Lesser Sunda Islands, and northern Australia.

The species in Cravenia were formerly placed in the large genus Hibiscus, until phylogenetic studies found the genus to be polyphyletic.

== Species ==
Six species are accepted.

- Cravenia apoda (Juswara & Craven) McLay & R.L.Barrett
- Cravenia austrina (Juswara & Craven) McLay & R.L.Barrett
- Cravenia calcicola (Juswara & Craven) McLay & R.L.Barrett
- Cravenia fluvialis (Juswara & Craven) McLay & R.L.Barrett
- Cravenia multilobata (Juswara & Craven) McLay & R.L.Barrett
- Cravenia panduriformis (Burm.f.) McLay & R.L.Barrett
