= Taurella =

Scientific classification
- Kingdom: Animalia
- Phylum: Arthropoda
- Clade: Pancrustacea
- Class: Insecta
- Order: Hemiptera
- Suborder: Auchenorrhyncha
- Family: Cicadidae
- Subfamily: Cicadettinae
- Genus: Taurella; Moulds, 2012

Genus of cicadas

Taurella is a genus of cicadas in the family Cicadidae, subfamily Cicadettinae and tribe Cicadettini. It is endemic to Australia. It was described in 2012 by Australian entomologist Maxwell Sydney Moulds.

== Etymology ==
The genus name Taurella is derived from Latin taura (a freemartin), with reference to an anatomical feature – the bull-like horns on the uncus.

== Species ==
As of 2025 there were three described species in the genus:

- Taurella forresti (Distant, 1882) (Hibiscus Cicada)
- Taurella froggatti (Distant, 1907) (Red Fairy)
- Taurella viridis (Ashton, 1912) (Emerald Fairy)
