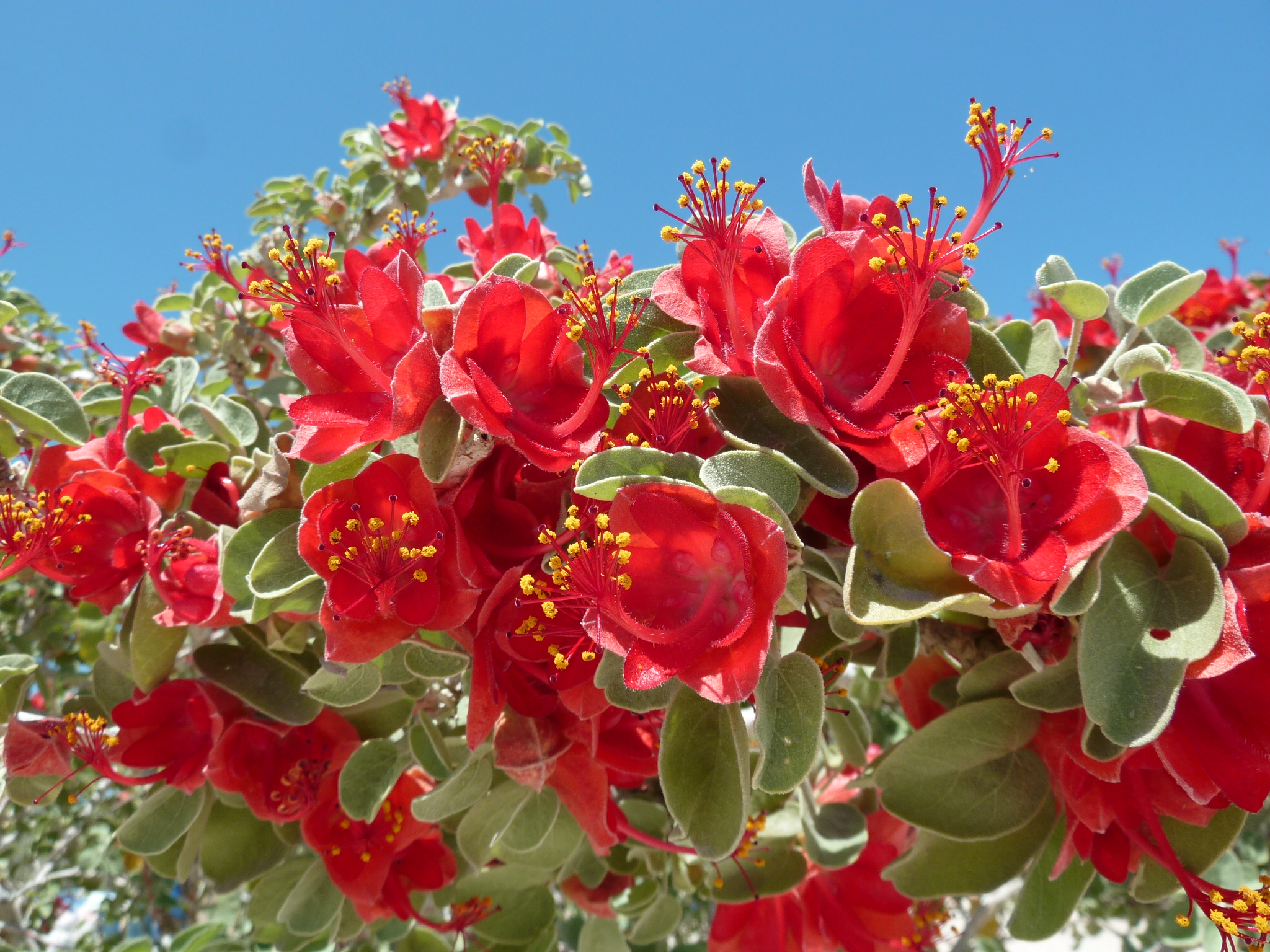
- Megistostegium microphyllum

Scientific classification
- Kingdom: Plantae
- Clade: Tracheophytes
- Clade: Angiosperms
- Clade: Eudicots
- Clade: Rosids
- Order: Malvales
- Family: Malvaceae
- Subfamily: Malvoideae
- Tribe: Hibisceae
- Genus: Megistostegium; Hochr.

Species
- See text

Synonyms
- Macrocalyx Costantin & Poiss.

= Megistostegium =

Genus of flowering plants

Megistostegium is a genus of trees and shrubs in the family Malvaceae. The species are all endemic to Madagascar. The genus is threatened by livestock grazing, invasive plants and threats to pollinators.

== Species ==
Three species are recognised:

- Megistostegium microphyllum Hochr.
- Megistostegium nodulosum (Drake) Hochr.
- Megistostegium perrieri Hochr.
