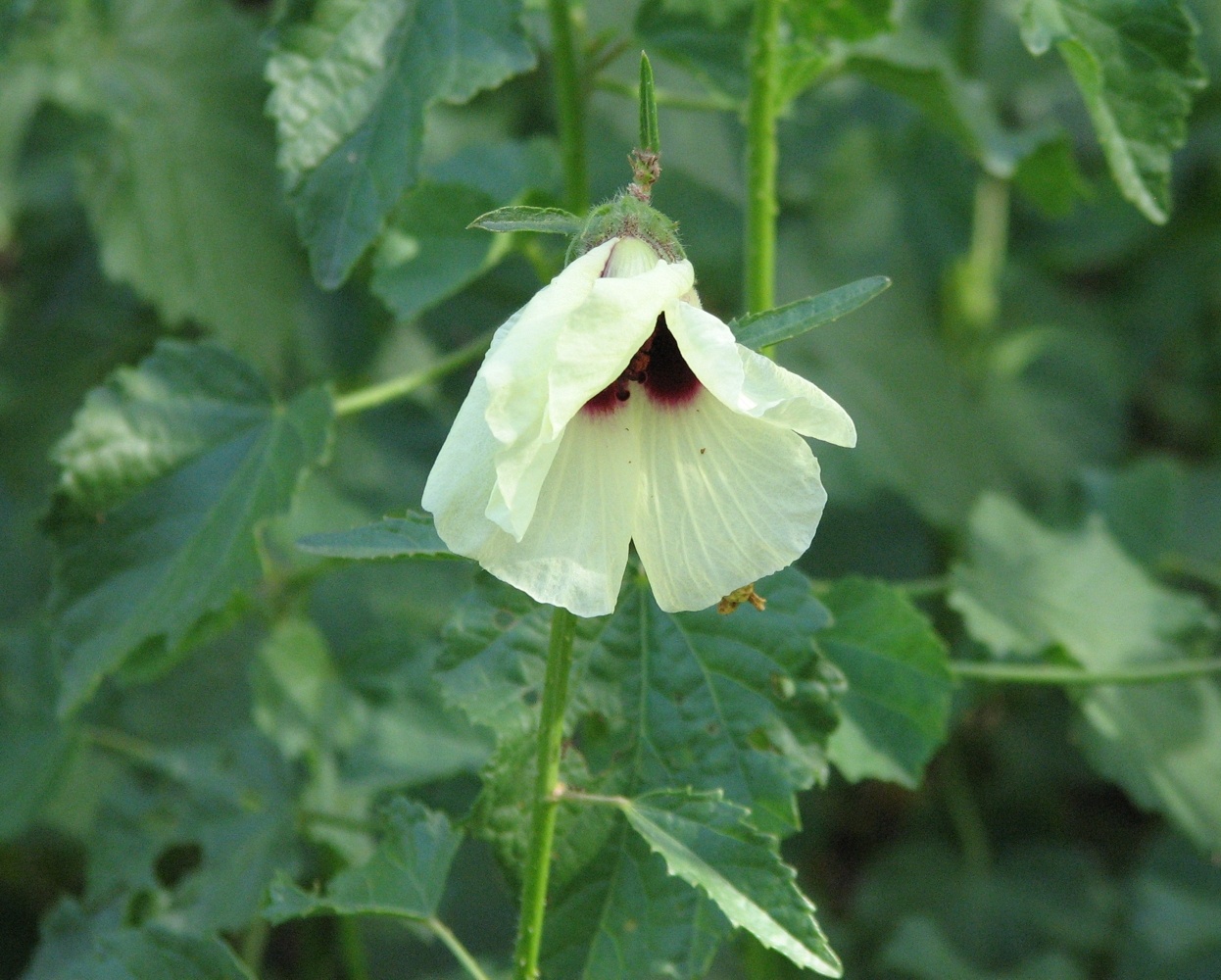

Scientific classification
- Kingdom: Plantae
- Clade: Embryophytes
- Clade: Tracheophytes
- Clade: Spermatophytes
- Clade: Angiosperms
- Clade: Eudicots
- Clade: Rosids
- Order: Malvales
- Family: Malvaceae
- Genus: Sabdariffa
- Species: S. diversifolia

Binomial name
- Sabdariffa diversifolia (Jacq.) McLay & R.L.Barrett

Subspecies
- Sabdariffa diversifolia subsp. diversifolia; Sabdariffa diversifolia subsp. rivularis (Bremek. & Oberm.) ined.

Synonyms
- Hibiscus diversifolius Jacq. (1789); Hibiscus diversifolius subsp. genuinus Hochr.

= Sabdariffa diversifolia =

Swamp hibiscus

Species of flowering plant

Sabdariffa diversifolia is a widespread species of Sabdariffa. It grows to between 1 and 2 metres in height, with prickly stems and yellow flowers with a maroon basal spot during spring summer.

== Distribution ==
It occurs in tropical Africa, New Guinea, the Philippines, many Pacific Islands, Central and South America, the Galapagos Islands, New Zealand, Norfolk Island as well as the states of New South Wales and Queensland in Australia. There is disagreement over its native range. Some sources consider it native only to Africa, and naturalised elsewhere, but it is considered a native in New Zealand and Australia.

It is found in low, swampy areas; in Africa it may occur inland or near the coast, but in all other continents it occurs only in coastal areas. This distribution, together with genomic evidence, suggests that it originated in Africa, and colonised the other continents through long-range salt-water dispersal.

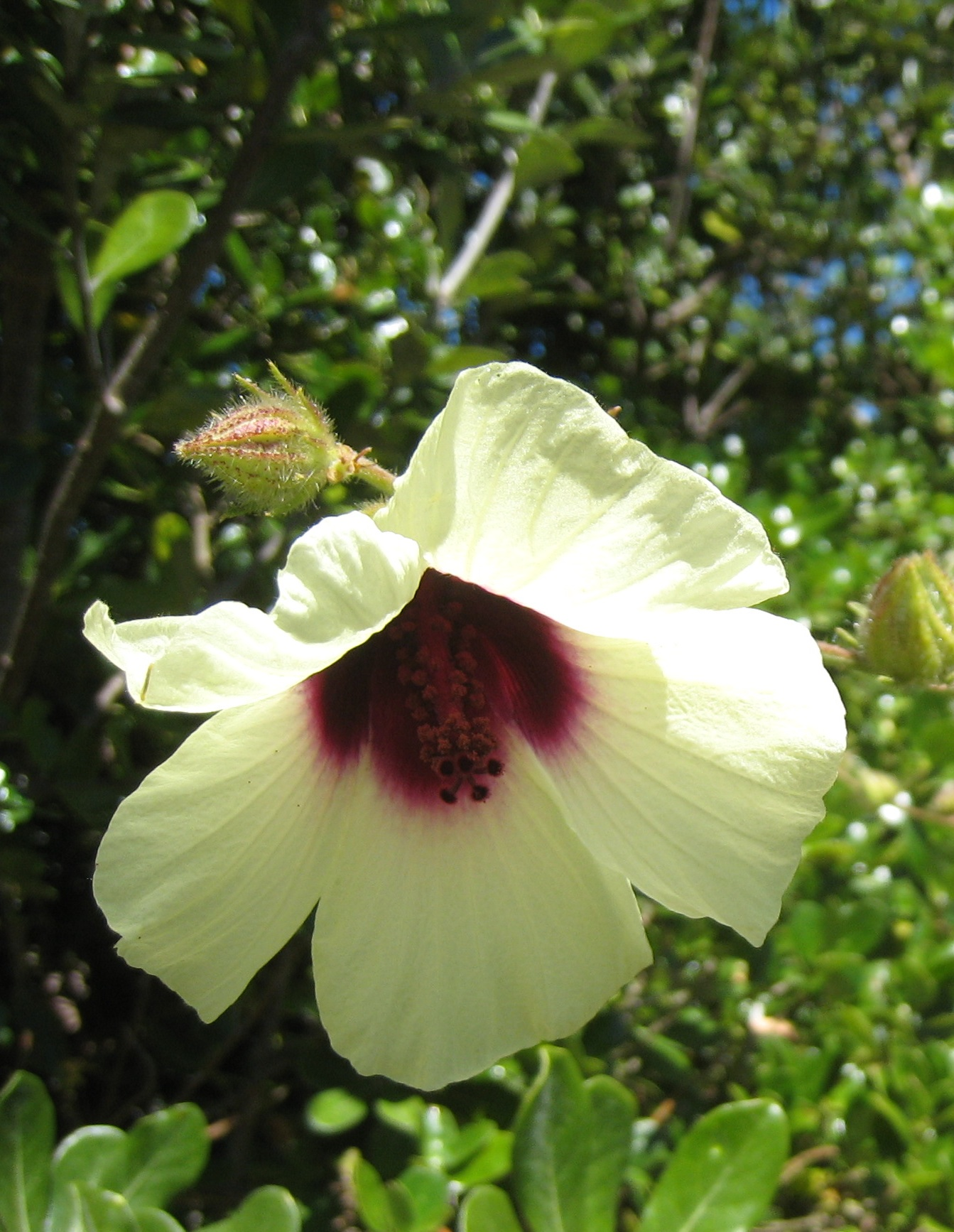
Sabdariffa diversifolia flower
