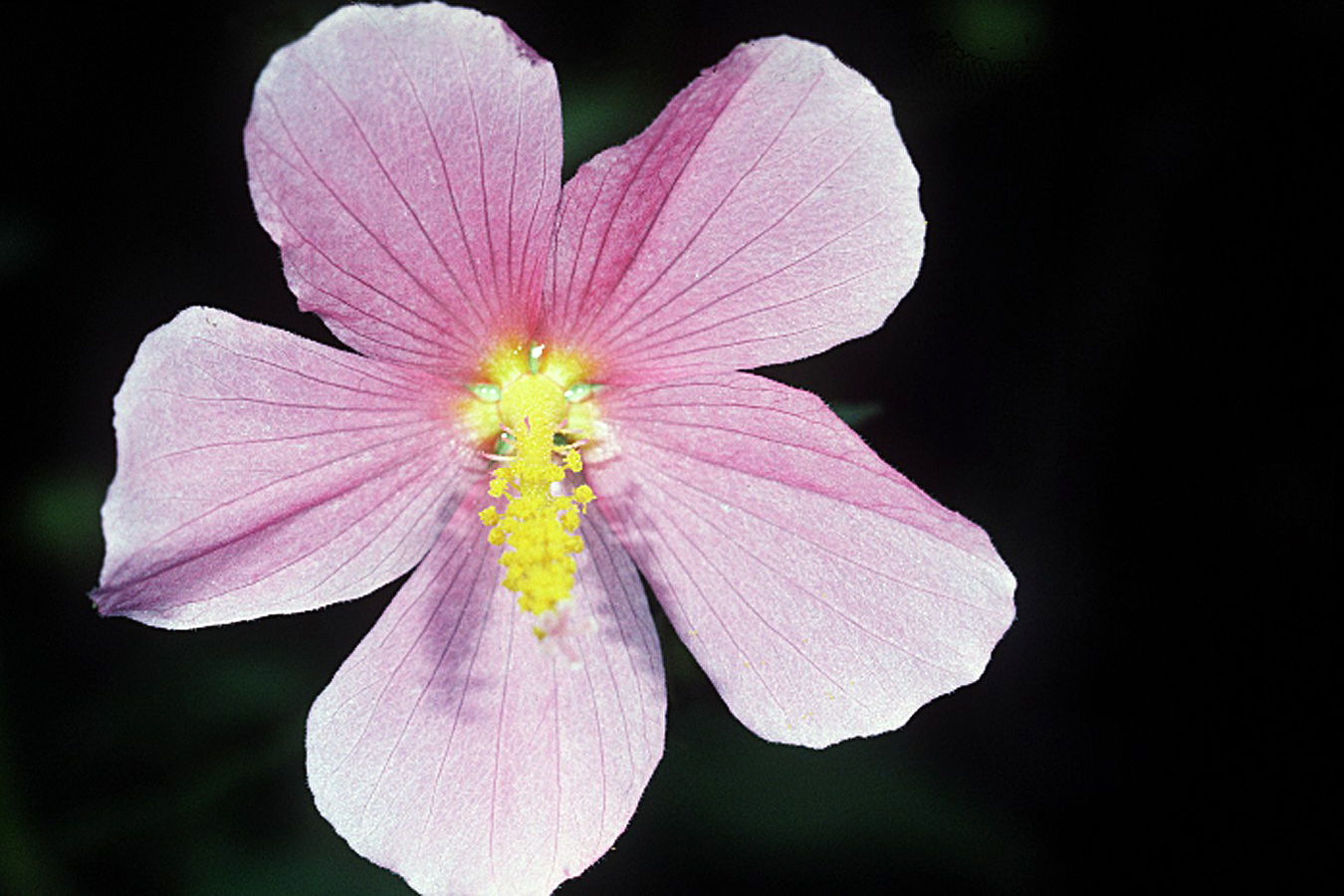
- Kosteletzkya pentacarpos

Scientific classification
- Kingdom: Plantae
- Clade: Tracheophytes
- Clade: Angiosperms
- Clade: Eudicots
- Clade: Rosids
- Order: Malvales
- Family: Malvaceae
- Subfamily: Malvoideae
- Tribe: Hibisceae
- Genus: Kosteletzkya; C.Presl

Species
- See text

Synonyms
- Pentagonocarpus Parl.; Polychlaena Garcke

= Kosteletzkya =

Genus of flowering plants

Kosteletzkya is a genus of the plant family Malvaceae that includes the seashore mallow (K. pentacarpos). It includes about 19 species found worldwide.

Although similar in appearance to Hibiscus, Kosteletzkya typically bears more flattened capsules that dehisce loculicidally. The genus was separated from Hibiscus in 1835 by Carl Borivoj Presl, who named it after Vincenz Franz Kosteletzky (1801–1887).

Phylogenetic evidence supports this genus being polyphyletic, with New World and Malagasy species of Kosteletzkya belonging to completely different clades within the Hibisceae. Under a revised nomenclature, only New World species would retain the genus name Kosteletzkya. An alternate revision would be to merge all New World Kosteletzkya species into Hibiscus.

== Species ==
19 species are accepted by Plants of the World Online as of October 2025:

- Kosteletzkya adoensis (Hochst. ex A.Rich.) Mast.
- Kosteletzkya batacensis (Blanco) Fern.-Vill.
- Kosteletzkya begoniifolia (Ulbr.) Ulbr.
- Kosteletzkya blanchardii Fryxell
- Kosteletzkya borkouana Quézel
- Kosteletzkya buettneri Gürke
- Kosteletzkya depressa (L.) O.J.Blanch., Fryxell & D.M.Bates – stinging mallow or white fenrose
- Kosteletzkya flavicentrum Fryxell & S.D.Koch
- Kosteletzkya grantii (Mast.) Garcke
- Kosteletzkya hispidula (Spreng.) Garcke
- Kosteletzkya pentacarpos (L.) Ledeb. – seashore mallow
- Kosteletzkya racemosa Hauman
- Kosteletzkya ramosa Fryxell
- Kosteletzkya reclinata Fryxell
- Kosteletzkya rotundalata O.J.Blanch.
- Kosteletzkya semota O.J.Blanch.
- Kosteletzkya thurberi A.Gray
- Kosteletzkya tubiflora (Moc. & Sessé ex DC.) O.J.Blanch. & McVaugh
- Kosteletzkya velutina
- Kosteletzkya wetarensis Borss.Waalk.

=== Formerly placed here ===
- Perrierophytum macranthum (Hochr.) M.M.Hanes & Callm. (as K. macrantha Hochr.)
- Perrierophytum madagascariense (Baker) M.M.Hanes & Callm. (as *K. madagascariensis Baker)
- Perrierophytum malvocoeruleum (Hochr.) M.M.Hanes & Callm. (as K. malvocoerulea Hochr.)
- Perrierophytum reflexiflorum (Hochr.) M.M.Hanes & Callm. (as K. reflexiflora Hochr.)
- Perrierophytum thouarsianum (Baill.) M.M.Hanes & Callm. (as K. thouarsiana Baill.)
- Perrierophytum velutinum (Garcke) M.M.Hanes & Callm. (as K. velutina Garcke)
