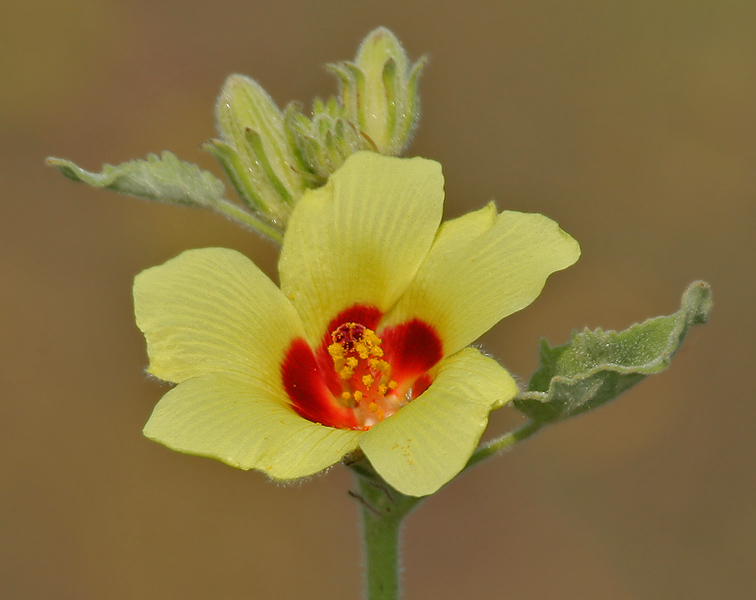
- Close-up of flower
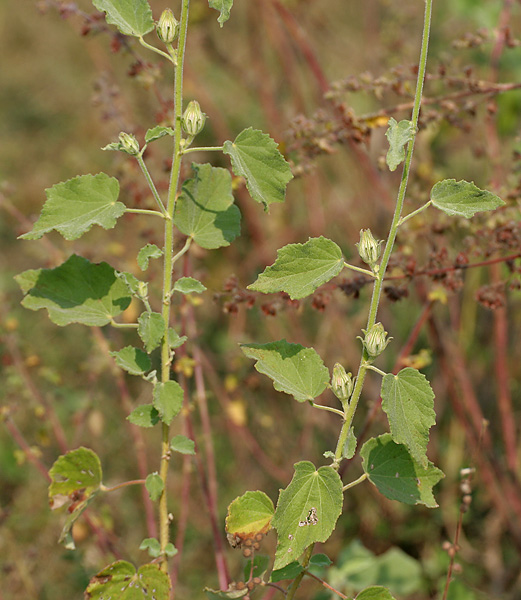
- Stems, leaves, and flower buds

Scientific classification
- Kingdom: Plantae
- Clade: Embryophytes
- Clade: Tracheophytes
- Clade: Angiosperms
- Clade: Eudicots
- Clade: Rosids
- Order: Malvales
- Family: Malvaceae
- Genus: Cravenia
- Species: C. panduriformis

Binomial name
- Cravenia panduriformis (Burm.f.) McLay & R.L.Barrett

Synonyms
- List: Abelmoschus panduriformis Hassk.; Hibiscus friesii Ulbr.; Hibiscus mollis Zipp. ex Span.; Hibiscus multistipulatus Garcke; Hibiscus panduriformis Burm.f.; Hibiscus panduriformis var. tubulosus (Cav.) Hochr.; Hibiscus senegalensis Guill. & Perr.; Hibiscus setosus Wall.; Hibiscus stipularis Salisb.; Hibiscus tubulosus Cav.; Hibiscus velutinus DC.; Parita panduriformis (Burm.f.) Scop.; Triplochiton setosa Alef.

= Cravenia panduriformis =

Species of flowering plant

Cravenia panduriformis (synonym Hibiscus panduriformis), the yellow hibiscus, is a species of flowering plant in the family Malvaceae, native to much of Tropical Africa, Madagascar, Yemen, the Indian Subcontinent, Myanmar, Sulawesi, and northern Australia. An erect shrub reaching 2.5 m (8 ft), it is a minor weed of cotton.

The species was first described as Hibiscus panduriformis by Nicolaas Laurens Burman in 1768. In 2024 Todd G.B. McLay and Russell Lindsay Barrett placed the species in the genus Cravenia as C. panduriformis.
