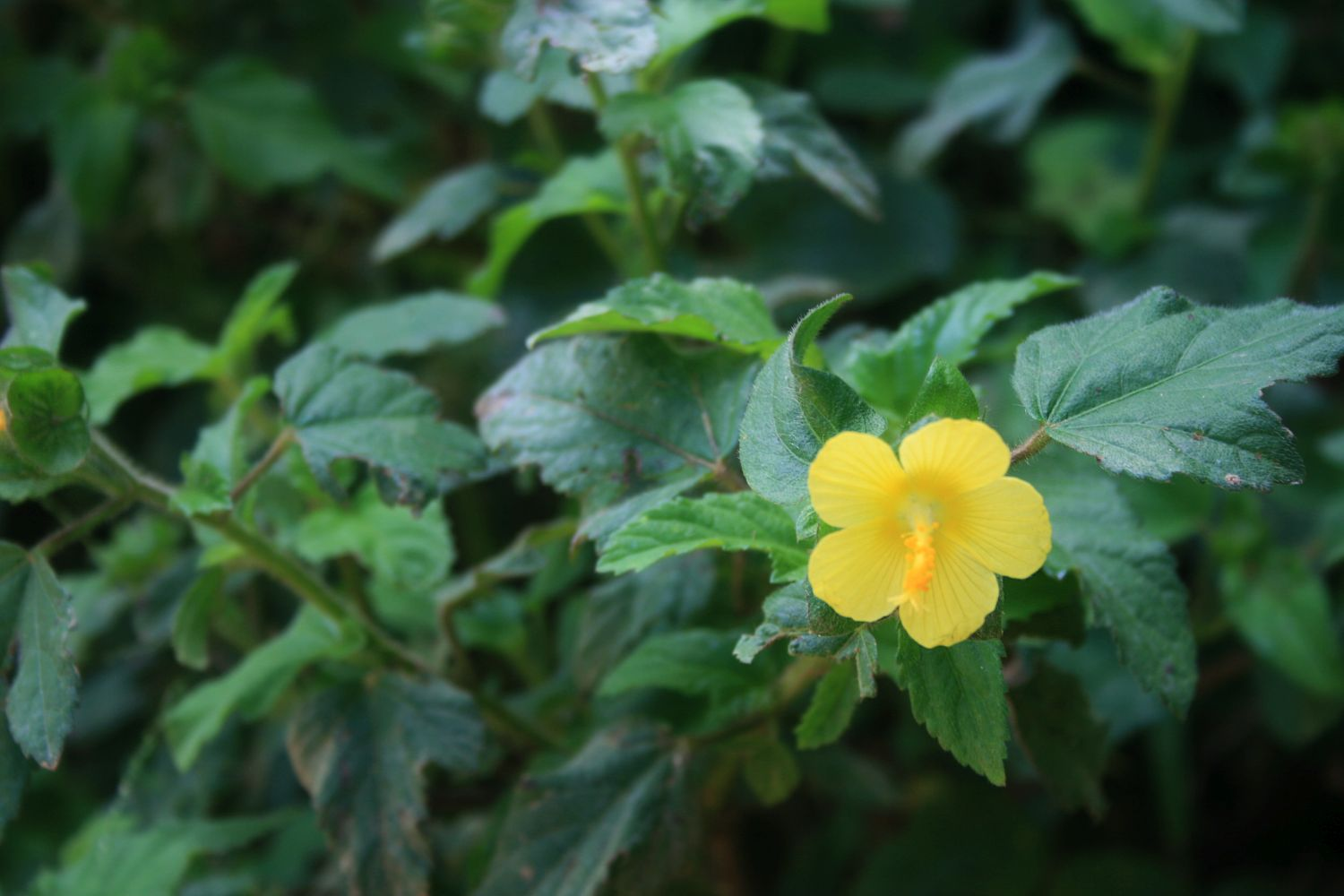
- Malachra rudis

Scientific classification
- Kingdom: Plantae
- Clade: Embryophytes
- Clade: Tracheophytes
- Clade: Angiosperms
- Clade: Eudicots
- Clade: Rosids
- Order: Malvales
- Family: Malvaceae
- Subfamily: Malvoideae
- Tribe: Hibisceae
- Genus: Malachra; L.

Species
- See text

= Malachra =

Genus of flowering plants

Malachra is a genus of flowering plants in the family Malvaceae, native to the Americas and Africa, and introduced in places in Asia. They lack an epicalyx, an autapomorphy within their tribe Hibisceae, which is known for having epicalyces.

== Species ==
Currently accepted species include:

- Malachra alceifolia Jacq.
- Malachra capitata (L.) L.
- Malachra fasciata Jacq.
- Malachra helodes Mart.
- Malachra officinalis Klotzsch
- Malachra radiata (L.) L.
- Malachra ruderalis Gürke
- Malachra rudis Benth.
- Malachra urens Poit. ex Ledeb.
