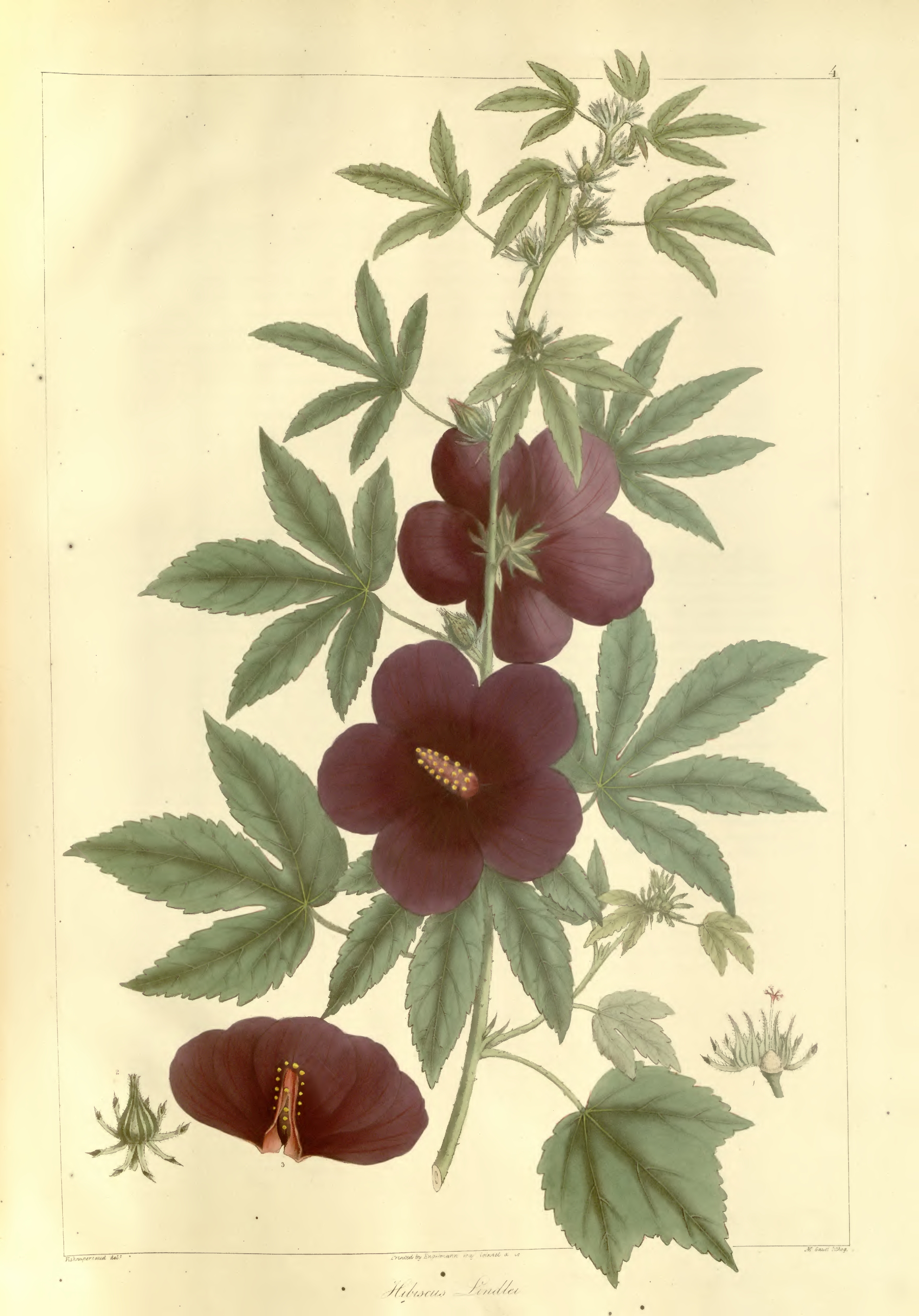
- Hibiscus radiatus, var. Lindlei

Scientific classification
- Kingdom: Plantae
- Clade: Embryophytes
- Clade: Tracheophytes
- Clade: Spermatophytes
- Clade: Angiosperms
- Clade: Eudicots
- Clade: Rosids
- Order: Malvales
- Family: Malvaceae
- Genus: Sabdariffa
- Species: S. radiata

Binomial name
- Sabdariffa radiata (Cav.) R.L.Barrett & M.M.Hanes

Synonyms
- Canhamo braziliensis Perini; Hibiscus cannabinus var. unidens (Lindl.) Hochr.; Hibiscus heptaphyllus Dalzell & A.Gibson; Hibiscus lindleyi Wall.; Hibiscus radiatus Cav.; Hibiscus unidens Lindl.; Pavonia perinii Perini

= Sabdariffa radiata =

Monarch rosemallow

Species of flowering plant

Sabdariffa radiata (commonly known as monarch rosemallow) is native to southern and southeast Asia. It has 15 cm (5.9 in) mauve flowers that have a purple center and yellow anthers. Leaves are dentate, with upper leaves lobed into three, five, or seven parts. Leaves are mistaken as marijuana, but radiatus' stems have small thorns. It is frequently grown as a vegetable or medicinal herb.
