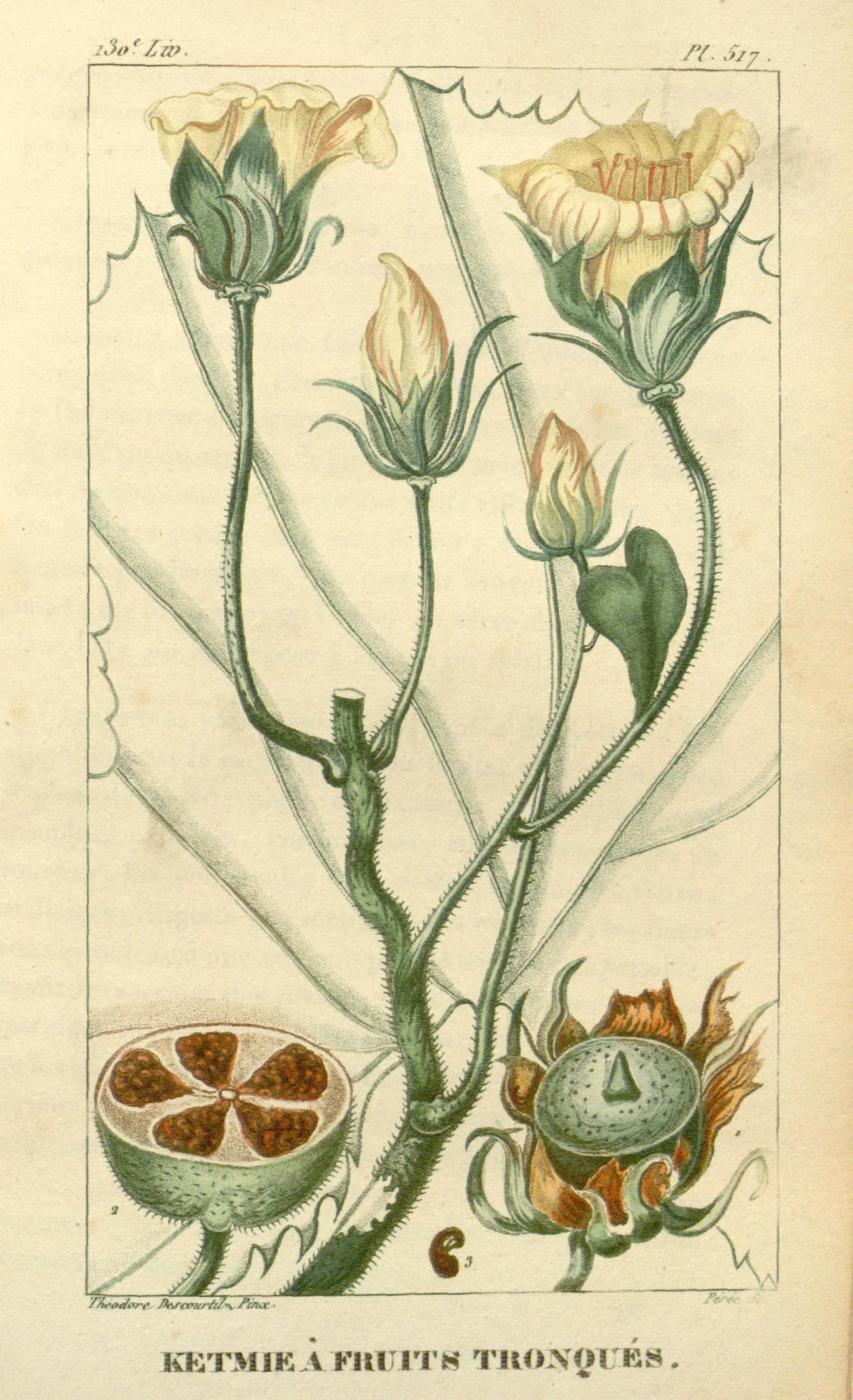

Scientific classification
- Kingdom: Plantae
- Clade: Tracheophytes
- Clade: Angiosperms
- Clade: Eudicots
- Clade: Rosids
- Order: Malvales
- Family: Malvaceae
- Subfamily: Malvoideae
- Tribe: Hibisceae
- Genus: Blanchardia; M.M.Hanes & R.L.Barrett
- Species: B. clypeata

Binomial name
- Blanchardia clypeata (L.) M.M.Hanes & R.L.Barrett

Synonyms
- Hibiscus clypeatus L. (1759) (species basionym); Munchusia tomentosa Raf.

= Blanchardia =

Genus of flowering plants

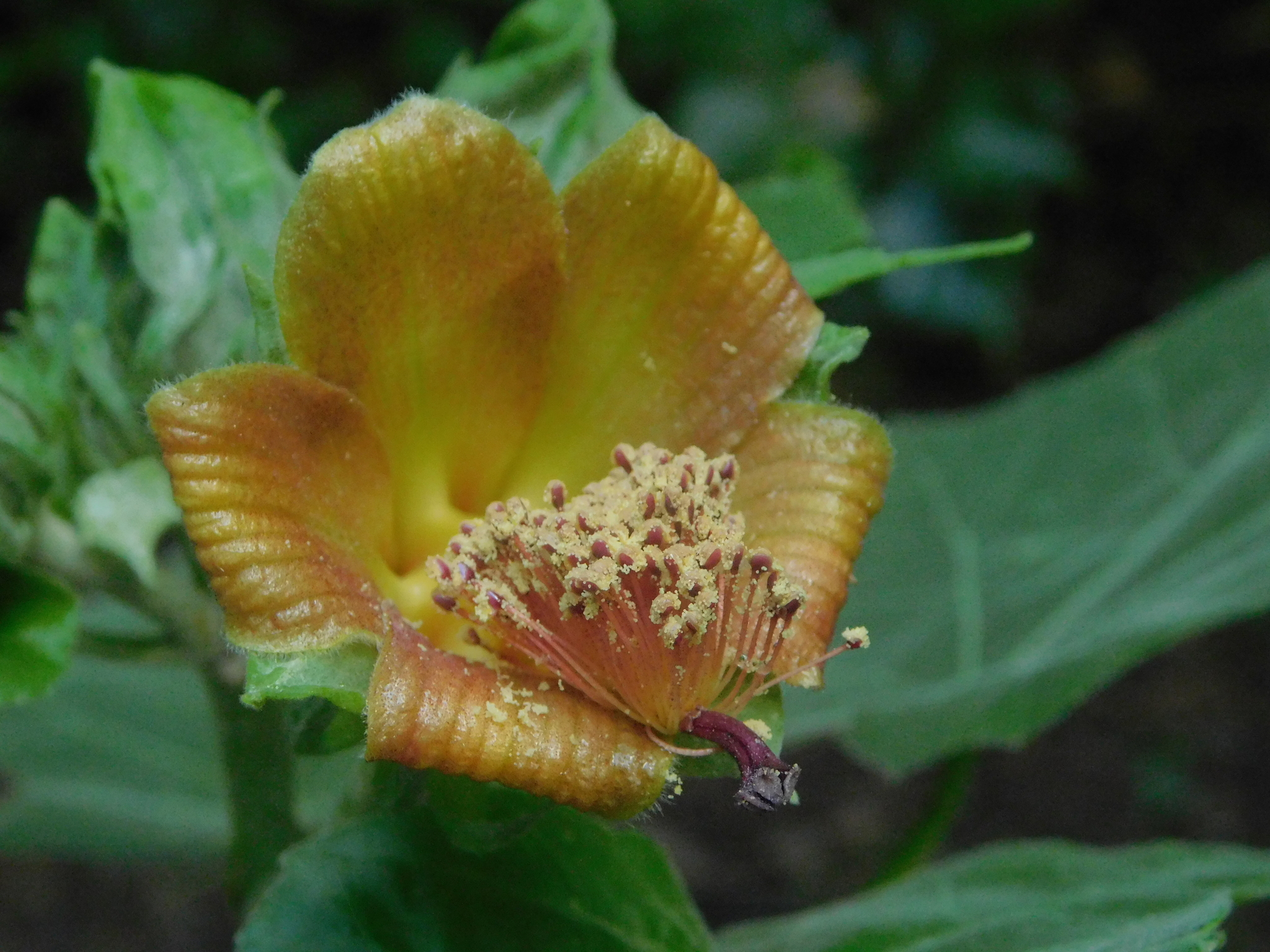
Blanchardia clypeata flower

Blanchardia is a genus of flowering plants in the family Malvaceae. It includes a single species, Blanchardia clypeata, a shrub or tree which ranges from Texas through eastern Mexico to Guatemala and the Caribbean Islands.

The species was first described as Hibiscus clypeatus by Carl Linnaeus in 1759. Phylogenetic analyses revealed that the large genus Hibiscus was polyphyletic, and in 2024 Margaret M. Hanes and Russell Lindsay Barrett placed the species in the newly described monotypic genus Blanchardia as Blanchardia clypeata.

Three subspecies are accepted.

- Blanchardia clypeata subsp. clypeata – Texas, eastern Mexico, Guatemala, and Caribbean
- Blanchardia clypeata subsp. cryptocarpa (A.Rich.) M.M.Hanes & R.L.Barrett – Cuba
- Blanchardia clypeata subsp. membranacea (Cav.) M.M.Hanes & R.L.Barrett – Bahamas, Cuba, and Tortuga (Haiti)
