= Bombycidendron =

Scientific classification
- Kingdom: Plantae
- Clade: Tracheophytes
- Clade: Angiosperms
- Clade: Eudicots
- Clade: Rosids
- Order: Malvales
- Family: Malvaceae
- Genus: Bombycidendron; Zoll. & Moritzi (1845)

Genus of plants

Bombycidendron is a genus of flowering plants in the family Malvaceae. It includes three species native to Indochina, Hainan, the Philippines, and Java.

== Species ==
Three species are accepted:

- Bombycidendron campylosiphon (Turcz.) Warb. – Philippines (Luzon)
- Bombycidendron grewiifolium (Hassk.) Zoll. & Moritzi – Indochina, Hainan, and Java
- Bombycidendron vidalianum (Náves) Merr. & Rolfe – Philippines
