= Roifia =

Scientific classification
- Kingdom: Plantae
- Clade: Tracheophytes
- Clade: Angiosperms
- Clade: Eudicots
- Clade: Rosids
- Order: Malvales
- Family: Malvaceae
- Genus: Roifia; Verdc.
- Species: R. dictyocarpa

Binomial name
- Roifia dictyocarpa (Webb) Verdc.

Synonyms
- Fioria dictyocarpa (Webb) Mattei; Fioria pavonioides (Fiori) Mattei; Hibiscus dictyocarpus Webb; Hibiscus pavonioides Fiori; Pavonia dictyocarpa Hochst. ex Webb

Genus of plants

Roifia dictyocarpa is a species of flowering plant in family Malvaceae. It is the sole species in genus Roifia. It is an erect perennial herb or subshrub native to northeastern Africa (Kenya, Somalia, Ethiopia, and Sudan) and the Arabian Peninsula (Saudi Arabia).

It grows in open Vachellia bussei–Senegalia mellifera bushland, floodplain bushland, and scattered tree grassland with acacias and species of Commiphora, Cordia, and Terminalia from 200 to 750 meters elevation, usually on grey alluvial soil.
