= Woodianthus =

Scientific classification
- Kingdom: Plantae
- Clade: Tracheophytes
- Clade: Angiosperms
- Clade: Eudicots
- Clade: Rosids
- Order: Malvales
- Family: Malvaceae
- Genus: Woodianthus; Krapov.
- Species: W. sotoi

Binomial name
- Woodianthus sotoi Krapov.

Genus of flowering plants

Woodianthus is a genus of flowering plants belonging to the family Malvaceae. It includes a single species, Woodianthus sotoi, a shrub native to eastern Bolivia.
