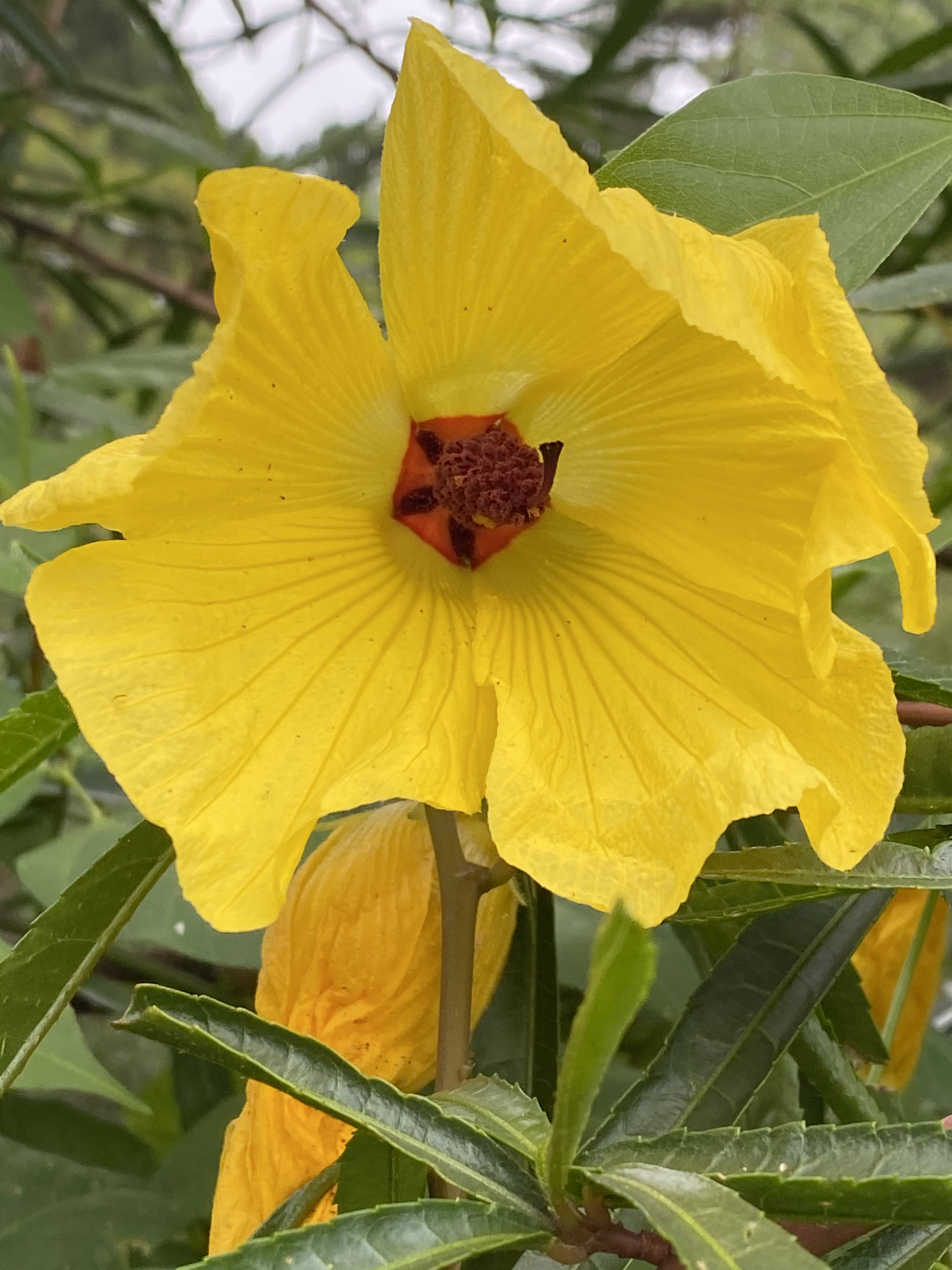

Scientific classification
- Kingdom: Plantae
- Clade: Embryophytes
- Clade: Tracheophytes
- Clade: Spermatophytes
- Clade: Angiosperms
- Clade: Eudicots
- Clade: Rosids
- Order: Malvales
- Family: Malvaceae
- Genus: Sabdariffa
- Species: S. heterophylla

Binomial name
- Sabdariffa heterophylla (Vent.) McLay & R.L.Barrett

Synonyms
- Hibiscus aculeatus F.Dietr.; Hibiscus divaricatus var. luteus Hochr.; Hibiscus fitzgeraldii F.Muell.; Hibiscus flabellatus Desf.; Hibiscus grandiflorus Salisb.; Hibiscus heterophyllus Vent. (1805); Hibiscus heterophyllus var. discolor Domin; Hibiscus heterophyllus var. flaviflorus F.Muell.; Hibiscus heterophyllus var. genuinus Hochr.; Hibiscus heterophyllus var. hispidifolia F.Muell.; Hibiscus heterophyllus var. leefei Hochr.; Hibiscus heterophyllus subsp. luteus (Hochr.) F.D.Wilson; Hibiscus heterophyllus var. margeriae Domin; Hibiscus margeriae A.Cunn. ex Benth.

= Sabdariffa heterophylla =

Native rosella

Species of tree

Sabdariffa heterophylla, commonly known as native rosella or toilet paper bush, is a flowering plant in the family Malvaceae. It a shrub or small tree with white, pale pink or yellow flowers with a dark red centre and grows in New South Wales and Queensland.

== Description ==
Sabdariffa heterophylla is a shrub or small tree with more or less smooth, prickly stems. The lower leaves are egg-shaped or with 3-5 lobes, upper leaves are narrowly oval shaped to narrowly lance shaped and 5–18 cm (2.0–7.1 in) long. The flowers are borne singly in leaf axils, calyx lobes lance-shaped, 20–35 mm (0.79–1.38 in) long with a dense covering of rusty-coloured star shaped, short, matted hairs. The flower corolla 5–7 cm (2.0–2.8 in) long, pale pink, white or yellow with a dark red centre. The fruit is 20 mm (0.79 in) long and covered with straw-coloured short, soft, upright hairs. Flowering occurs from spring to summer.

== Taxonomy and naming ==
Hibiscus heterophyllus was first formally described in 1805 by Étienne Pierre Ventenat and the description was published in Jardin de la Malmaison. The specific epithet (heterophyllus) means "different" and "leaved" with reference to having varying shaped leaves. Dtharang-gange is recorded as an Aboriginal name for the plant, from New South Wales.

== Distribution and habitat ==
This species is usually found in open forest, rainforest or nearby, from north-east Queensland to the south coast of New South Wales.

== Uses ==
The indigenous Australians consumed the young shoots, leaves, and roots of the plant without preparation. The flowers were eaten either raw or cooked. The plant’s fibre, known for its strength, was traditionally extracted through maceration and used to make items such as dilly bags and hunting nets.

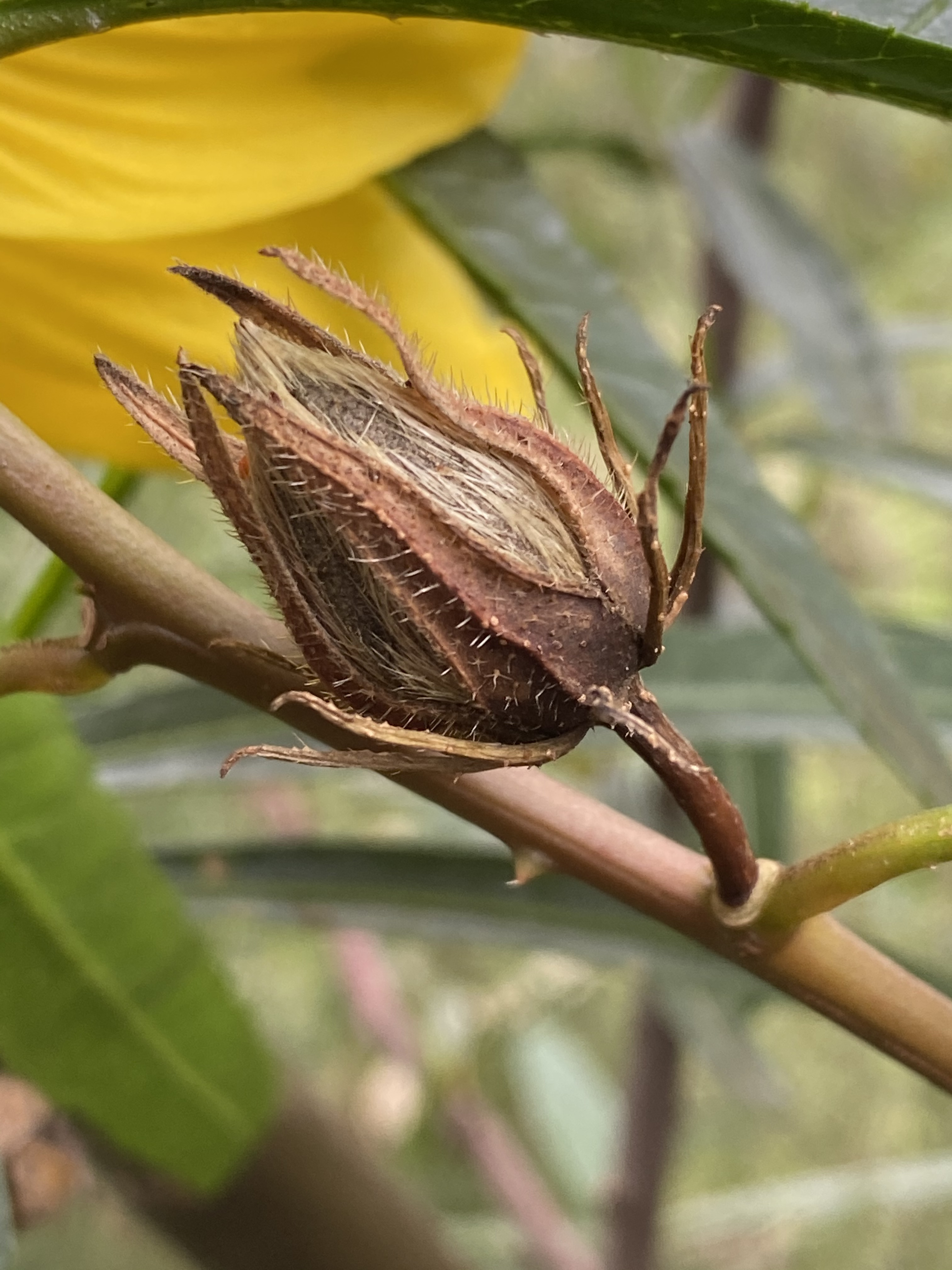
Fruit

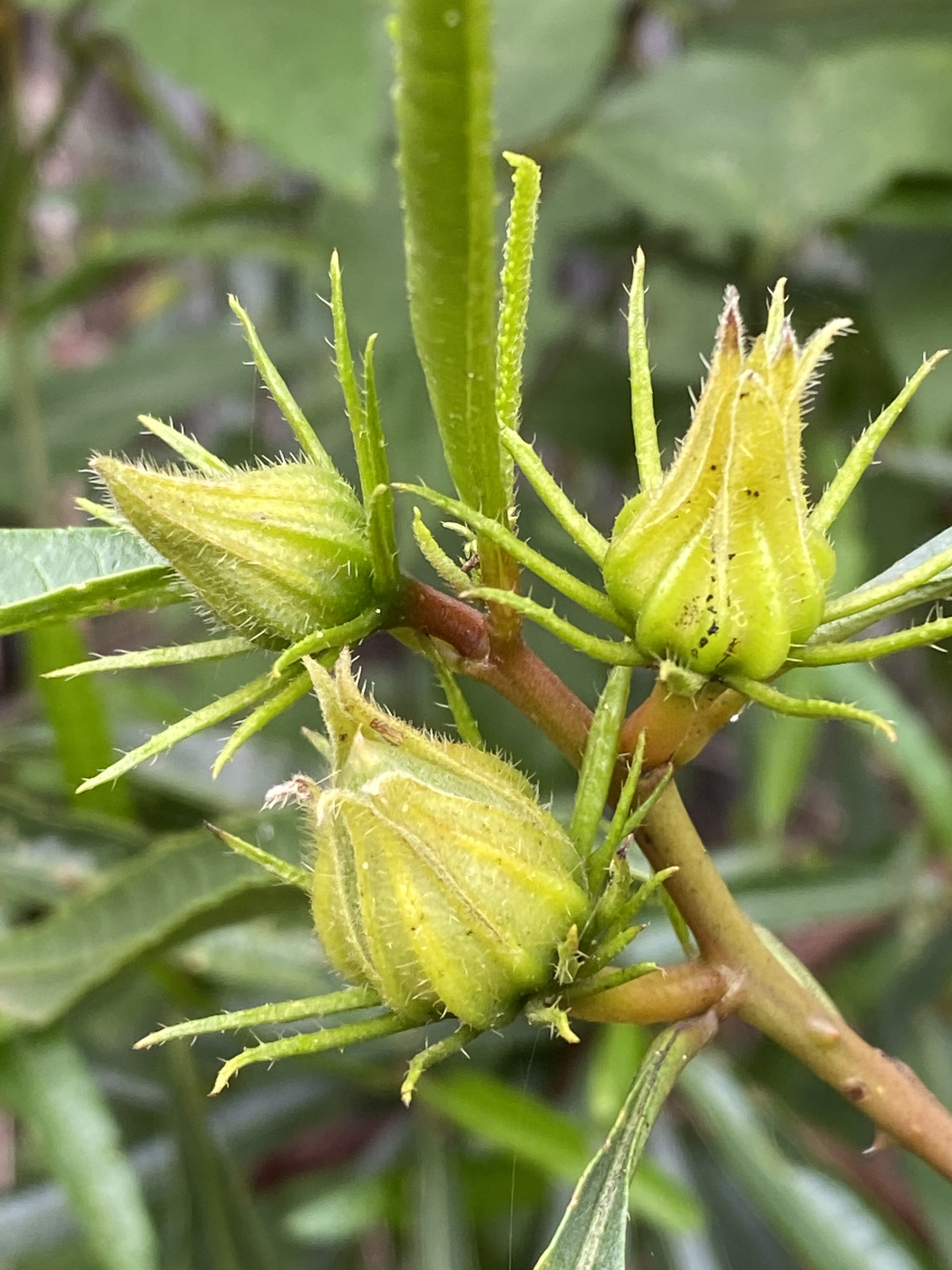
Flower buds

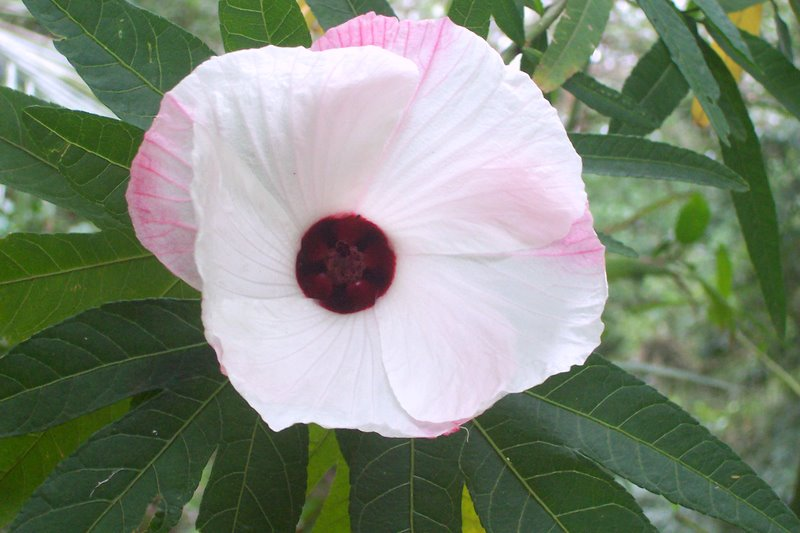
