= Bénédict Pierre Georges Hochreutiner =

Swiss botanist and plant taxonomist

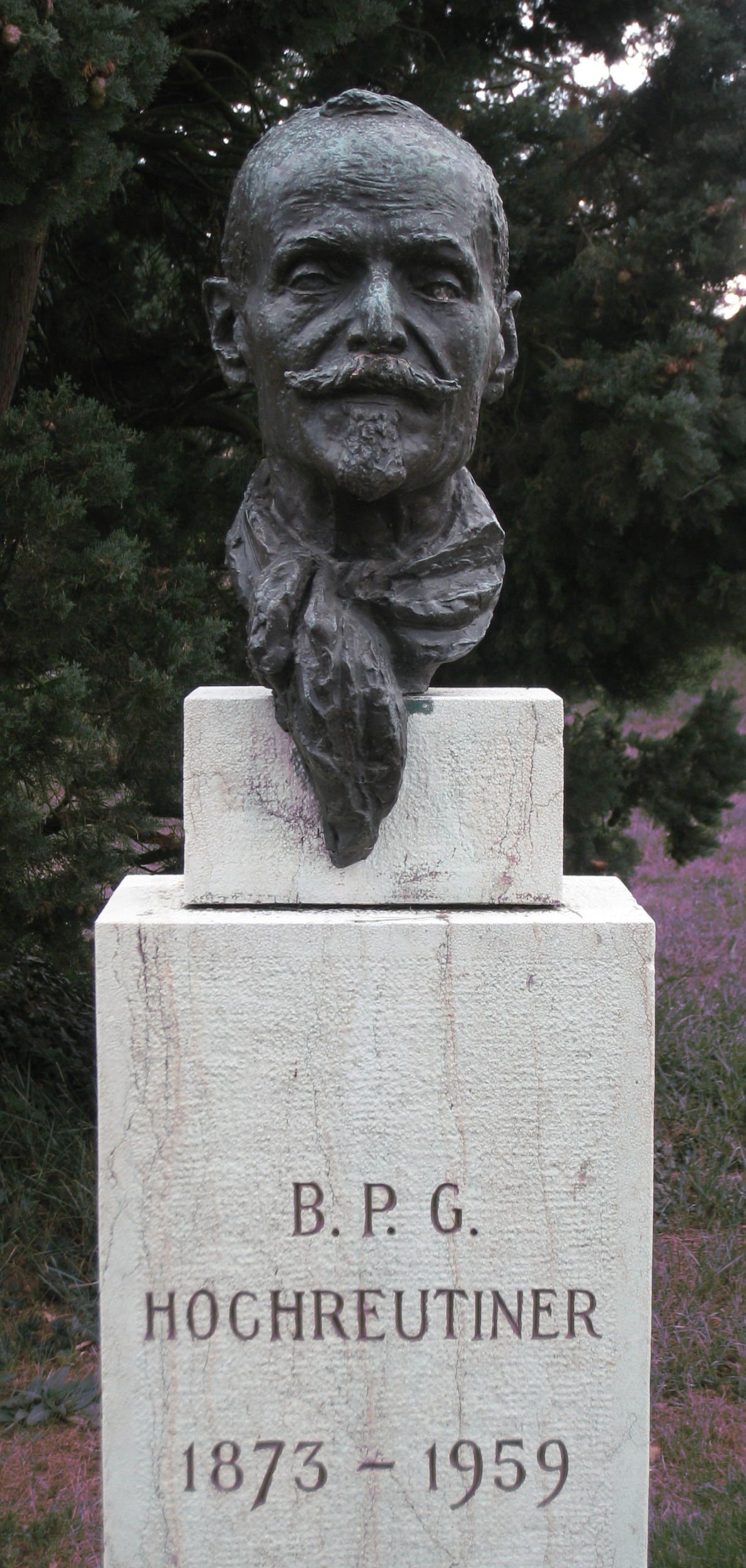
Bust of Hochreutiner in Geneva.

Bénédict Pierre Georges Hochreutiner (1873–1959) was a Swiss botanist and plant taxonomist.

A native of Saint-Gall, he studied theology and natural sciences in Geneva. In 1896 he was an assistant to John Isaac Briquet at the Conservatoire et Jardin Botaniques at Geneva. In 1901 he made a scientific trip to Algeria, and in 1903–05 was associated with the botanic gardens (herbarium) at Buitenzorg in the Dutch East Indies. In 1906 he was named curator of the Conservatoire et Jardin Botaniques, where in 1931 he was appointed director. In 1919 he became a professor of botany.

As a taxonomist, he circumscribed many botanical species. The genus Hochreutinera is named after him, as are taxa with specific epithet of hochreutineri. Among his numerous written works was a monograph on the plant family Malvaceae.

== Published works ==
- Études Sur Les Phanérogames Aquatique Du Rhône Et Du Port De Genève, 1896 – Studies of aquatic phanerogams of the Rhône and the Geneva harbor.
- Une famille de botanistes, les Candolle, 1898 - A family of botanists, the Candolles.
- Revision du genre Hibiscus, 1900 - Revision of the genus Hibiscus.
- Malvaceae, 1902.
- Les Sud-Oranais; études floristiques et phytogéographiques faites au cours d'une exploration dans le Sud-Ouest de l'Algérie en 1901, 1904 - Southern Oran, floristic and phytogeographical studies, etc.
- "Plantae Bogorienses exsiccatae novae vel minus cocnitae...", 1904; with exsiccata specimens distributed to a number of herbaria.
- "Critical Notes on New Or Little Known Species in the Herbarium of the New York Botanical Garden", 1910.
- La philosophie d'un naturaliste, 1911.
- Notes sur les Tiliacées avec descriptions d’espèces, de sections et de sous-familles nouvelles ou peu connues. Annuaire du Conservatoire et du Jardin botanique de Genève 18: 68–128, 1914.
- "Plantae Humbertianae madagascarenses", 1932.
- "Dr. John Briquet, 1870-1931", 1932 - biography of John Isaac Briquet.
