= Malacothamnus mendocinensis =

Conservation status
- Critically Imperiled (NatureServe)

Scientific classification
- Kingdom: Plantae
- Clade: Tracheophytes
- Clade: Angiosperms
- Clade: Eudicots
- Clade: Rosids
- Order: Malvales
- Family: Malvaceae
- Genus: Malacothamnus
- Species: M. mendocinensis

Binomial name
- Malacothamnus mendocinensis (Eastw.) Kearney

Synonyms
- Malvastrum mendocinense (Eastw..)

Species of flowering plant

Malacothamnus mendocinensis is a species of flowering plant in the mallow family known by the common name Mendocino bushmallow. It is endemic to Mendocino County, California, where it is known from only two populations. It was presumed extinct until rediscovered in 2016 and now has a California Rare Plant Rank of 1B.1 (Plants rare, threatened, or endangered in California and elsewhere). In some treatments, Malacothamnus mendocinensis has been included within Malacothamnus fasciculatus or Malacothamnus hallii. Phylogenetic and morphological evidence, however, indicate that it is not closely related to these species and should be recognized as a separate species.
