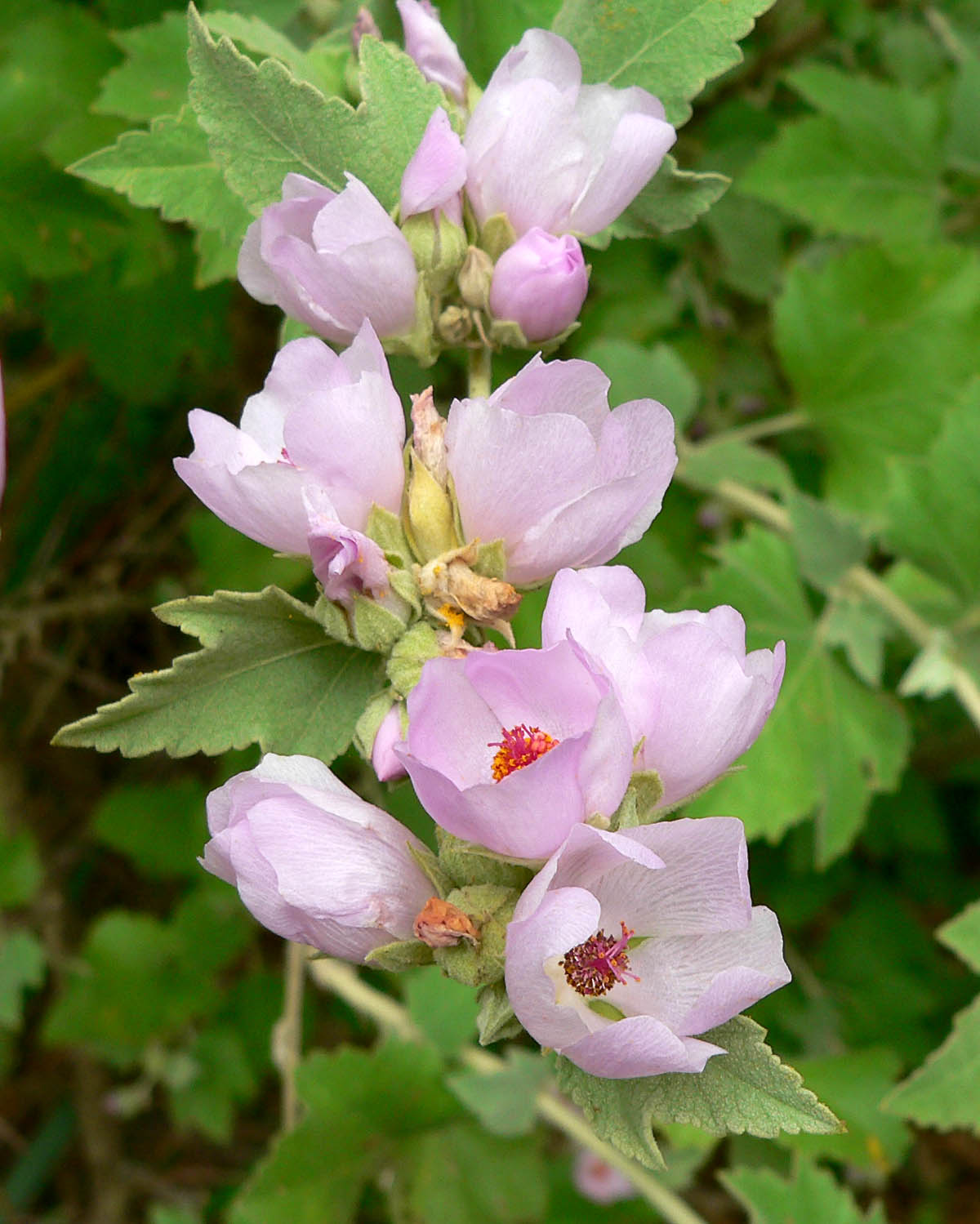
- Malacothamnus nuttallii

Scientific classification
- Kingdom: Plantae
- Clade: Tracheophytes
- Clade: Angiosperms
- Clade: Eudicots
- Clade: Rosids
- Order: Malvales
- Family: Malvaceae
- Genus: Malacothamnus
- Species: M. nuttallii

Binomial name
- Malacothamnus nuttallii Abrams

= Malacothamnus nuttallii =

Species of flowering plant

Malacothamnus nuttallii is a species of flowering plant in the mallow family known by the common name Ojai bushmallow. It is named after the botanist Thomas Nuttall. It is endemic to Santa Barbara, San Luis Obispo, and Ventura counties in California. It is sometimes treated as a variety of Malacothamnus fasciculatus but morphological, phylogenetic, and phenological evidence show it to be distinct. Malacothamnus nuttallii is widely planted and is in cultivation under the name Malacothamnus fasciculatus ‘Casitas’.

== Identification ==
Malacothamnus nuttallii is distinguished from all other species of Malacothamnus by the combination of its short calyx bracts, very short stellate trichome rays, generally moderately lobed leaves with pointed lobes, and roughly the same stellate trichome density across both leaf surfaces.
