= Malacothamnus eastwoodiae =

Conservation status
- Critically Imperiled (NatureServe)

Scientific classification
- Kingdom: Plantae
- Clade: Tracheophytes
- Clade: Angiosperms
- Clade: Eudicots
- Clade: Rosids
- Order: Malvales
- Family: Malvaceae
- Genus: Malacothamnus
- Species: M. eastwoodiae

Binomial name
- Malacothamnus eastwoodiae K.Morse

Species of flowering plant

Malacothamnus eastwoodiae is a species of flowering plant in the mallow family known by the common name Alice's lovely bushmallow. It is named after the botanist Alice Eastwood. It is endemic to Santa Barbara County, California and currently only known from Vandenberg Space Force Base.

== Identification ==
Malacothamnus eastwoodiae is distinguished from all other Malacothamnus taxa, excluding Malacothamnus densiflorus var. viscidus, by the combination of relatively long glandular trichomes and a spike-like inflorescence. Malacothamnus eastwoodiae is most easily distinguished from Malacothamnus densiflorus var. viscidus using geographic range.
