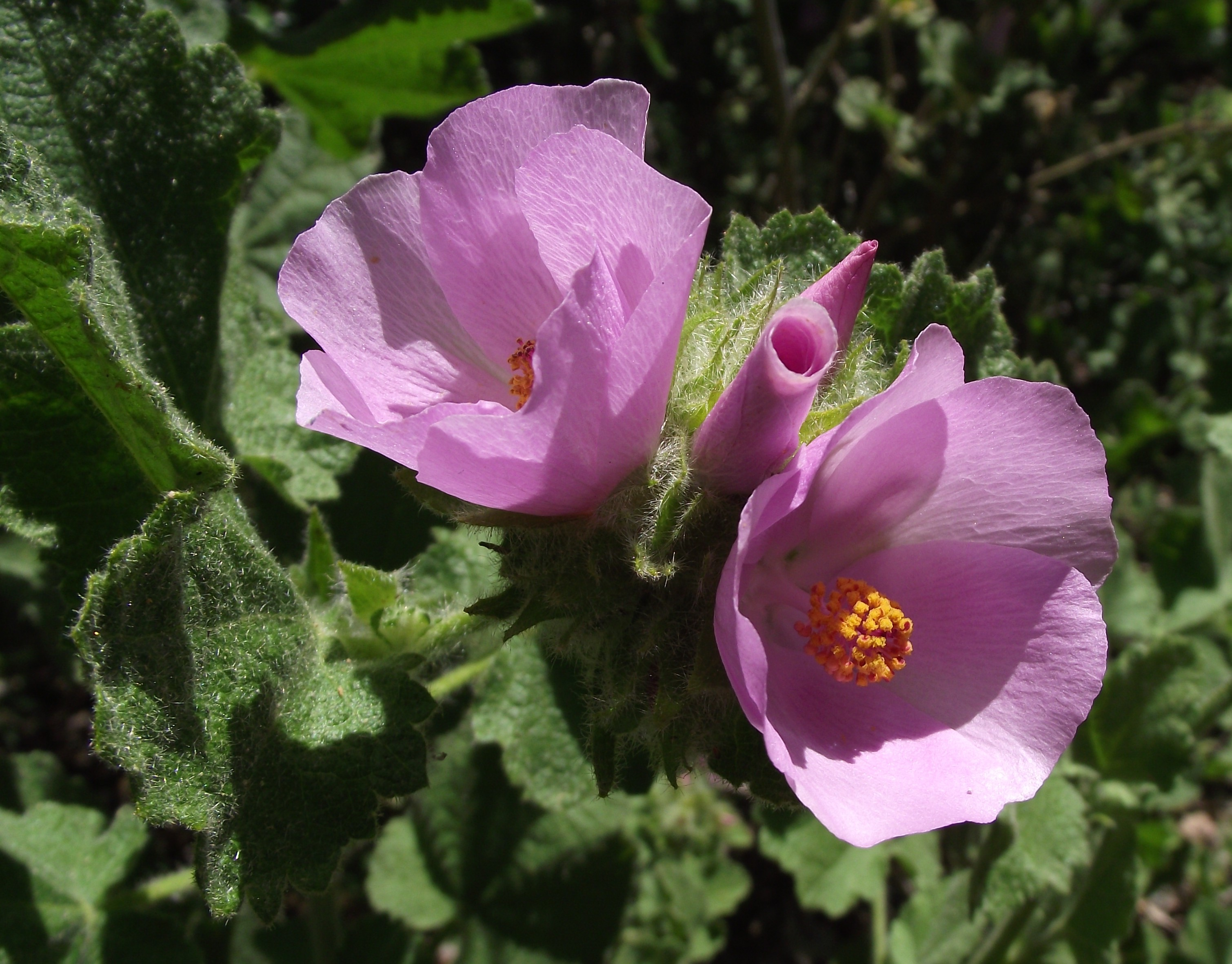

Conservation status
- Critically Imperiled (NatureServe)

Scientific classification
- Kingdom: Plantae
- Clade: Tracheophytes
- Clade: Angiosperms
- Clade: Eudicots
- Clade: Rosids
- Order: Malvales
- Family: Malvaceae
- Genus: Malacothamnus
- Species: M. lucianus

Binomial name
- Malacothamnus lucianus (Kearney) K.Morse

Synonyms
- Malacothamnus palmeri var. lucianus Kearney

= Malacothamnus lucianus =

Species of flowering plant

Malacothamnus lucianus is a species of flowering plant in the mallow family known by the common names Santa Lucia bushmallow and Arroyo Seco bushmallow and by the cultivar name Hanging Valley bushmallow. It is endemic to Monterey County, California, United States, where it is known from the Santa Lucia Mountains.

== Taxonomy ==
Malacothamnus lucianus was first described in 1955 as Malacothamnus palmeri var. lucianus but treated as a synonym of Malacothamnus palmeri var. palmeri or simply Malacothamnus palmeri until elevated to the rank of species in 2021.

== Identification ==
Malacothamnus lucianus is distinguished from all other species in the genus by the combination of a capitate to subcapitate inflorescence and relatively long glandular trichomes. Malacothamnus lucianus is distinguished from both Malacothamnus palmeri and Malacothamnus involucratus by having many rays of the stellate trichomes on the stem being 1–3 mm long and many of the glandular trichomes being 0.3-1.4 mm long. Conversely, in Malacothamnus palmeri and Malacothamnus involucratus most rays of the stellate trichomes on the stem are less than 1 mm long and the glandular trichomes are less or equals 0.1 mm long. Malacothamnus lucianus also often has somewhat of a rancid odor, which hasn't been recorded in Malacothamnus palmeri and Malacothamnus involucratus.
