= Malacothamnus abbottii =

Conservation status
- Critically Imperiled (NatureServe)

Scientific classification
- Kingdom: Plantae
- Clade: Tracheophytes
- Clade: Angiosperms
- Clade: Eudicots
- Clade: Rosids
- Order: Malvales
- Family: Malvaceae
- Genus: Malacothamnus
- Species: M. abbottii

Binomial name
- Malacothamnus abbottii (Eastw.) Kearney

Synonyms
- Malvastrum abbottii Eastw.

Species of flowering plant

Malacothamnus abbottii is a rare species of flowering plant in the mallow family known by the common name Abbott's bushmallow. It is endemic to Monterey County, California, where it has recently been observed at only a few locations. It was historically known from a single specimen collection and the plant was presumed extinct until it was rediscovered in 1990 near San Ardo in the Salinas River drainage. It is now known from eleven occurrences, many of which are actually part of a single population, growing in vulnerable riverbeds near oil fields. Its habitat is periodically flooding riparian scrub among sandbar willows (Salix exigua). This is a shrub with a slender, branching stem growing erect to a maximum height over one meter. It is coated in thin white hairs and bears toothed oval leaves a few centimeters long, sometimes divided into lobes. The inflorescence is a cluster of a few pale pink flowers with pointed oval petals 6 or 7 millimeters long.
