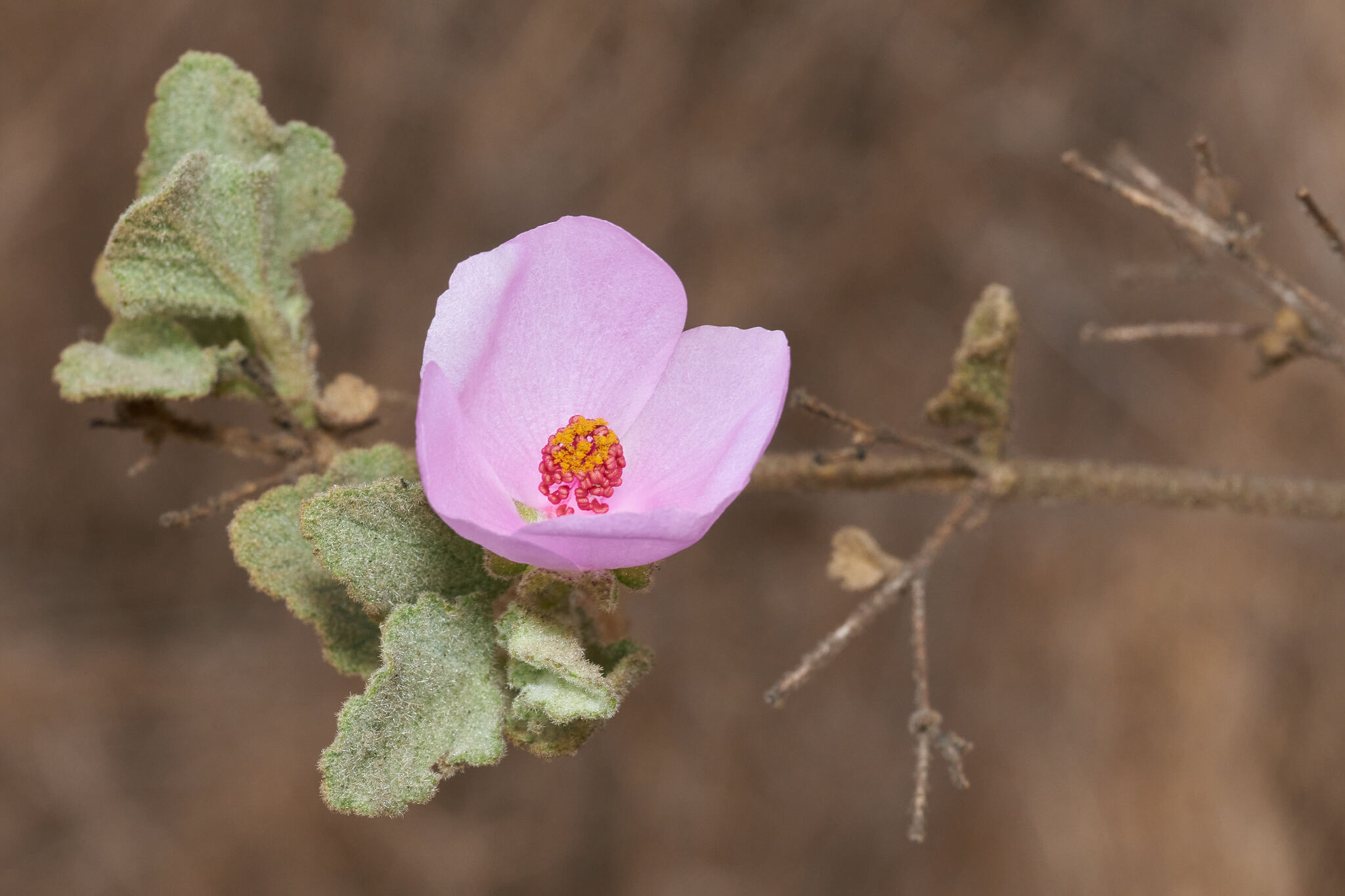

Scientific classification
- Kingdom: Plantae
- Clade: Tracheophytes
- Clade: Angiosperms
- Clade: Eudicots
- Clade: Rosids
- Order: Malvales
- Family: Malvaceae
- Genus: Malacothamnus
- Species: M. foliosus

Binomial name
- Malacothamnus foliosus (S.Watson) Kearney

= Malacothamnus foliosus =

Species of flowering plant

Malacothamnus foliosus is a species of flowering plant in the mallow family known by the common names Ensenada bushmallow and monarch bushmallow. It is endemic to Baja California, Mexico and has been introduced into Los Angeles County, California. Morphological and geographic evidence indicates that M. foliosus could possibly be treated as multiple taxa, but phylogenetic analyses are inconclusive and more research is needed.
