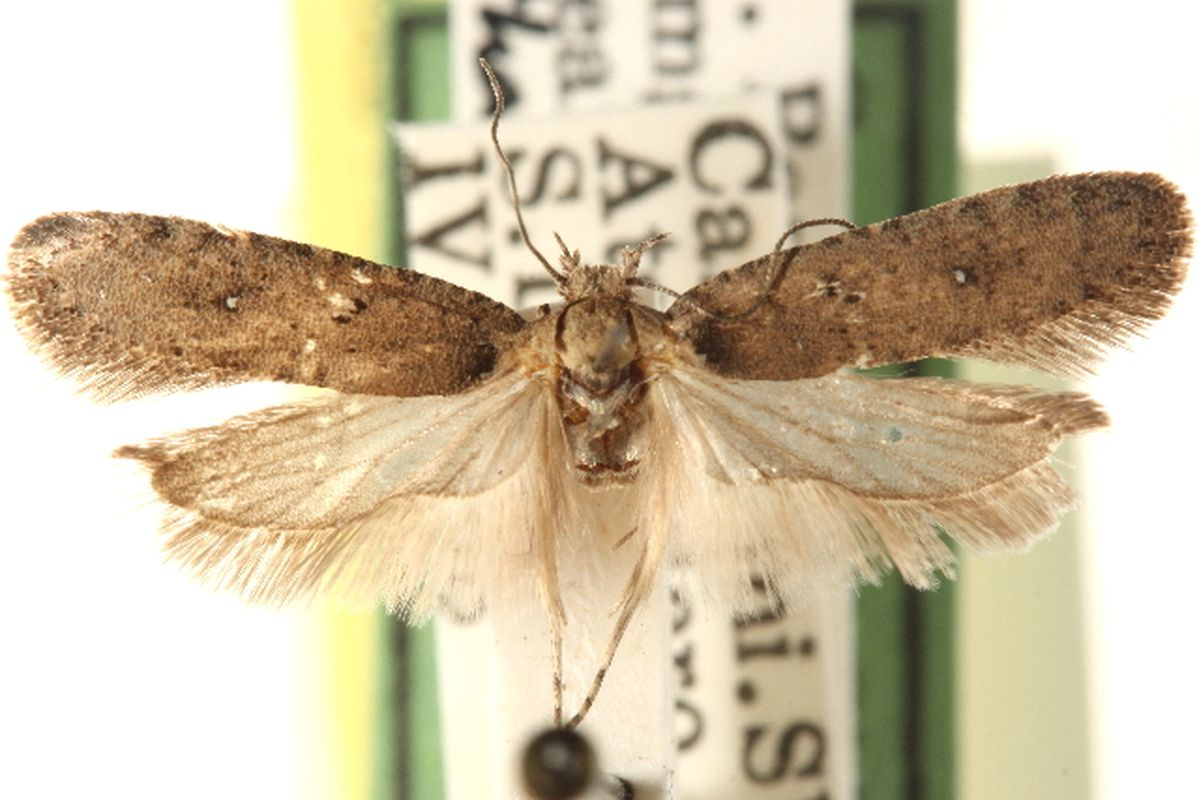

Scientific classification
- Kingdom: Animalia
- Phylum: Arthropoda
- Clade: Pancrustacea
- Class: Insecta
- Order: Lepidoptera
- Family: Depressariidae
- Genus: Exaeretia
- Species: E. thoracefasciella

Binomial name
- Exaeretia thoracefasciella (Chambers, 1875)

Synonyms
- Gelechia thoracefasciella Chambers, 1875; Depressariodes thoracefasciella; Martyrhilda thoracefasciella; Depressaria thoracifasciella Meyrick, 1922; Martyrhilda sphaeralceae Clarke, 1941

= Exaeretia thoracefasciella =

Species of moth

Exaeretia thoracefasciella is a moth in the family Depressariidae. It is found in North America, where it has been recorded from California to Washington.

The wingspan is 16–20 mm. The forewings are brownish fuscous sparsely irrorated with whitish ochreous and with the base and basal fourth of costa whitish ochreous. The extreme base of the costa and a shade beyond the whitish-ochreous base are blackish fuscous. The first two discal spots are small and black and there is a conspicuous white or whitish-ochreous discal spot at the end of the cell, surrounded by a blackish-fuscous suffusion. There is a series of poorly defined blackish-fuscous spots along the costa and around the termen. The hindwings are brownish fuscous, but lighter basally.

The larvae feed on Sphaeralcea munroana, Malacothamnus jonesii and Sidalcea species.
