= Malacothamnus orbiculatus =

Scientific classification
- Kingdom: Plantae
- Clade: Tracheophytes
- Clade: Angiosperms
- Clade: Eudicots
- Clade: Rosids
- Order: Malvales
- Family: Malvaceae
- Genus: Malacothamnus
- Species: M. orbiculatus

Binomial name
- Malacothamnus orbiculatus (Greene) Greene

Species of flowering plant

Malacothamnus orbiculatus is a species of flowering plant in the mallow family known by the common names Tehachapi bushmallow and round-leaved bushmallow. Most known populations occur in California, where it is common after burns on the desert-facing slopes of mountains. It also occurs in Arizona and Nevada, where it is currently only known from a few scattered locations. Malacothamnus orbiculatus is occasionally treated within Malacothamnus fremontii but morphological, phylogenetic, and geographic evidence shows them to be distinct species, though there is a small zone of intergradation where their geographic ranges meet.
