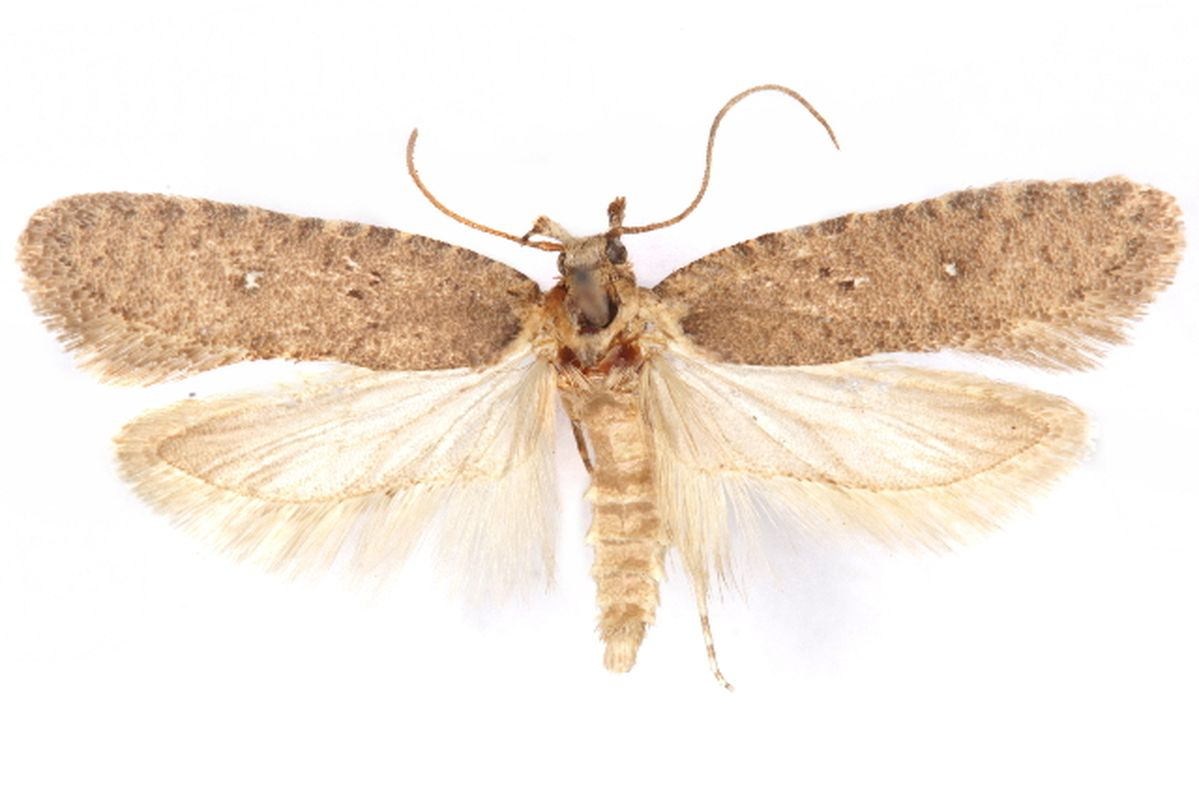

Scientific classification
- Kingdom: Animalia
- Phylum: Arthropoda
- Clade: Pancrustacea
- Class: Insecta
- Order: Lepidoptera
- Family: Depressariidae
- Genus: Exaeretia
- Species: E. nechlys

Binomial name
- Exaeretia nechlys (Hodges, 1974)

Synonyms
- Martyrhilda nechlys Hodges, 1974; Depressariodes nechlys

= Exaeretia nechlys =

Species of moth

Exaeretia nechlys is a moth in the family Depressariidae. It is found in North America, where it has been recorded from Arizona to California and in Nevada.

The larvae feed on Sidalcea malviflora, Malva, Malacothamnus jonesii and Sphaeralcea species.
