= Malacothamnus involucratus =

Conservation status
- Imperiled (NatureServe)

Scientific classification
- Kingdom: Plantae
- Clade: Tracheophytes
- Clade: Angiosperms
- Clade: Eudicots
- Clade: Rosids
- Order: Malvales
- Family: Malvaceae
- Genus: Malacothamnus
- Species: M. involucratus

Binomial name
- Malacothamnus involucratus (B.L.Rob.) K.Morse

Synonyms
- Malvastrum involucratum (B.L.Rob.); Malacothamnus palmeri var. involucratus (B.L.Rob.) Kearney

Species of flowering plant

Malacothamnus involucratus is a species of flowering plant in the mallow family known by the common name Carmel Valley bushmallow. It is likely endemic to Monterey County, California, where it is known from Carmel Valley and the Jolon region. A single specimen is attributed to San Luis Obispo County, California but the origin of this specimen is questionable.

== Taxonomy ==
Malacothamnus involucratus was first described in 1897 as Malvastrum involucratum. In some treatments it was treated as a synonym of Malacothamnus palmeri at the species rank or as a variety of Malacothamnus palmeri. This taxon was returned to the rank of species as Malacothamnus involucratus in 2021 based on it being both morphologically and geographically distinct from Malacothamnus palmeri.

== Identification ==
Malacothamnus involucratus is distinguished from all other species in the genus by the combination of a capitate to subcapitate inflorescence (occasionally spike-like), relatively wide stipular bracts, and relatively sparse stellate trichomes on the adaxial leaf surface. Malacothamnus palmeri is distinguished from Malacothamnus involucratus by having much denser stellate trichomes on the adaxial surface of mature leaves and by generally having the widest stipular bracts <=6.5 mm wide, whereas Malacothamnus involucratus generally has sparse stellate trichomes on the adaxial surface of mature leaves and the widest stipular bracts are generally >=7mm wide. Malacothamnus involucratus is distinguished from Malacothamnus lucianus by having glandular trichomes <0.1 mm and most stellate trichome rays on the stem <1 mm whereas Malacothamnus lucianus has glandular trichomes 0.3-1.4 mm and many stellate trichome rays on the stem 1–3 mm.
