= Malacothamnus enigmaticus =

Scientific classification
- Kingdom: Plantae
- Clade: Tracheophytes
- Clade: Angiosperms
- Clade: Eudicots
- Clade: Rosids
- Order: Malvales
- Family: Malvaceae
- Genus: Malacothamnus
- Species: M. enigmaticus

Binomial name
- Malacothamnus enigmaticus K.Morse & T.Chester

Species of flowering plant

Malacothamnus enigmaticus is a species of flowering plant in the mallow family known by the common name enigmatic bush-mallow. It is endemic to the Peninsular Ranges of California and Baja California, Mexico extending from the San Ysidro Mountains in the north to the Sierra de San Pedro Mártir in the south. It was first collected in 1938 and described as a new species to science in 2019. Prior to 2019, it had been mistakenly assigned to Malacothamnus aboriginum and Malacothamnus densiflorus.
