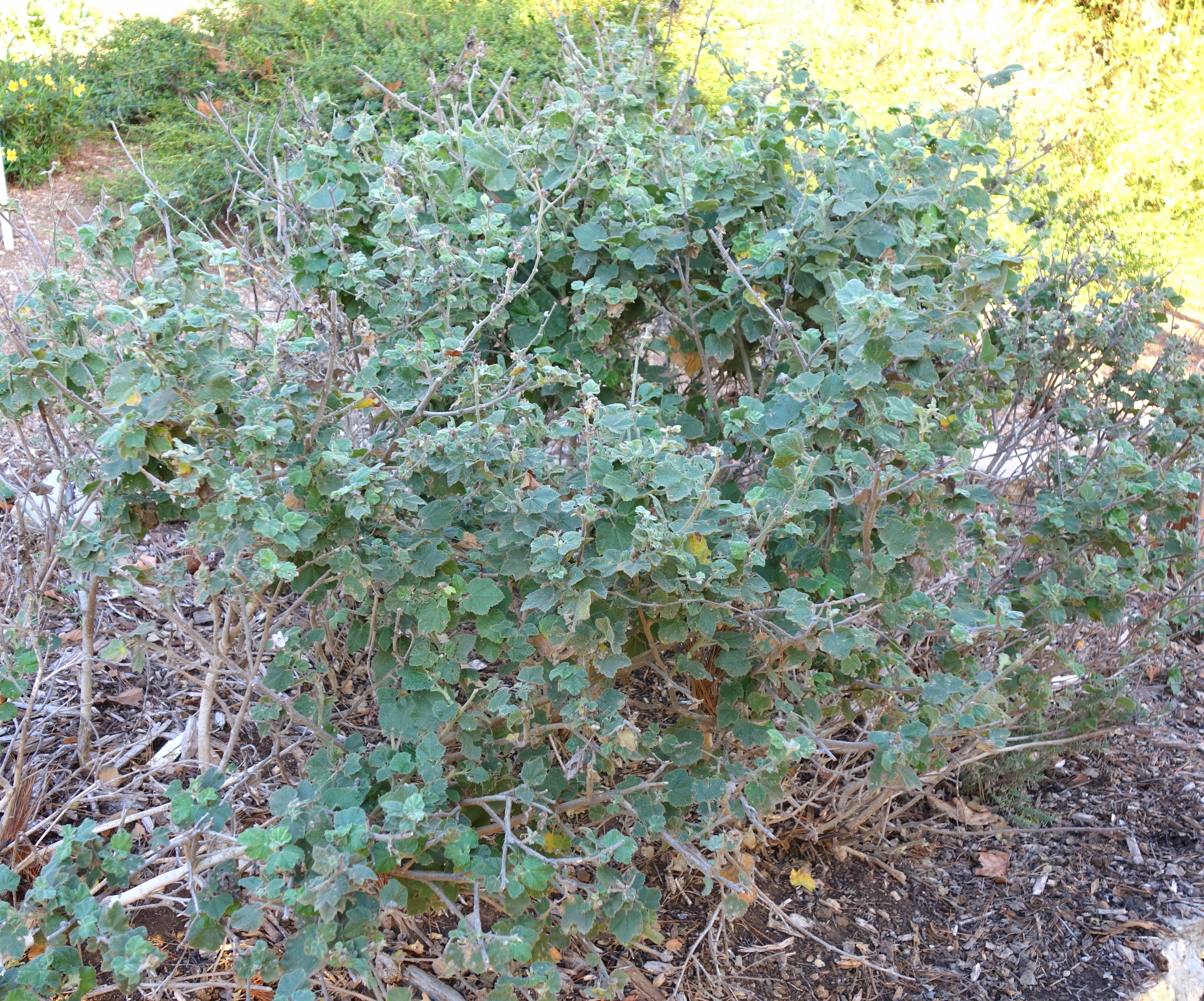

Conservation status
- Endangered (ESA)

Scientific classification
- Kingdom: Plantae
- Clade: Tracheophytes
- Clade: Angiosperms
- Clade: Eudicots
- Clade: Rosids
- Order: Malvales
- Family: Malvaceae
- Genus: Malacothamnus
- Species: M. clementinus

Binomial name
- Malacothamnus clementinus (Munz & I.M.Johnst.) Kearney

= Malacothamnus clementinus =

San Clemente Island bushmallow

Species of flowering plant

Malacothamnus clementinus is a rare species of flowering plant in the mallow family known by the common name San Clemente Island bushmallow. It is endemic to San Clemente Island, one of the Channel Islands of California, where it is known from fewer than ten occurrences in the steep, rocky seaside canyons.

The plant became a federally listed endangered species in 1977 when it was limited to a single population nearing extinction due to herbivory by the feral goats which once infested the small island. The goats have since been removed and the plant is recovering well, but many threats remain, including competition with introduced species of plants, wildfire, erosion, and damage to the landscape by United States Navy bombing exercises. Since the Navy removed goats from the island in the 1990s and started an intensive management program this species has recovered significantly. There are now over 80 known populations on the island consisting of over 1,500 individuals. In the last review of this species, the United States Fish and Wildlife Service recommended downlisting this species due to its recovery and the ongoing management that the Navy has committed to. This is a bushy shrub with a thin, multi-branched stem coated in long, fine hairs. It reaches heights between 40 centimeters and one meter. It bears rounded dark green leaves several centimeters long which are divided into sharp lobes. The inflorescence is a spikelike cluster of a few pale pink, lavender, or nearly white flowers with somewhat lance-shaped, hairy petals several millimeters long. It rarely produces fertile seed and it is believed to propagate itself mainly via rhizomes.
