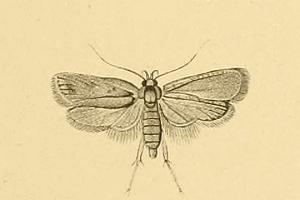

Scientific classification
- Kingdom: Animalia
- Phylum: Arthropoda
- Clade: Pancrustacea
- Class: Insecta
- Order: Lepidoptera
- Family: Depressariidae
- Genus: Exaeretia
- Species: E. conciliatella

Binomial name
- Exaeretia conciliatella (Rebel, 1892)

Synonyms
- Depressaria conciliatella Rebel, 1892

= Exaeretia conciliatella =

Species of moth

Exaeretia conciliatella is a moth of the family Depressariidae. It is found in Greece and on Sicily and the Canary Islands.

The wingspan is 20–22 mm.
