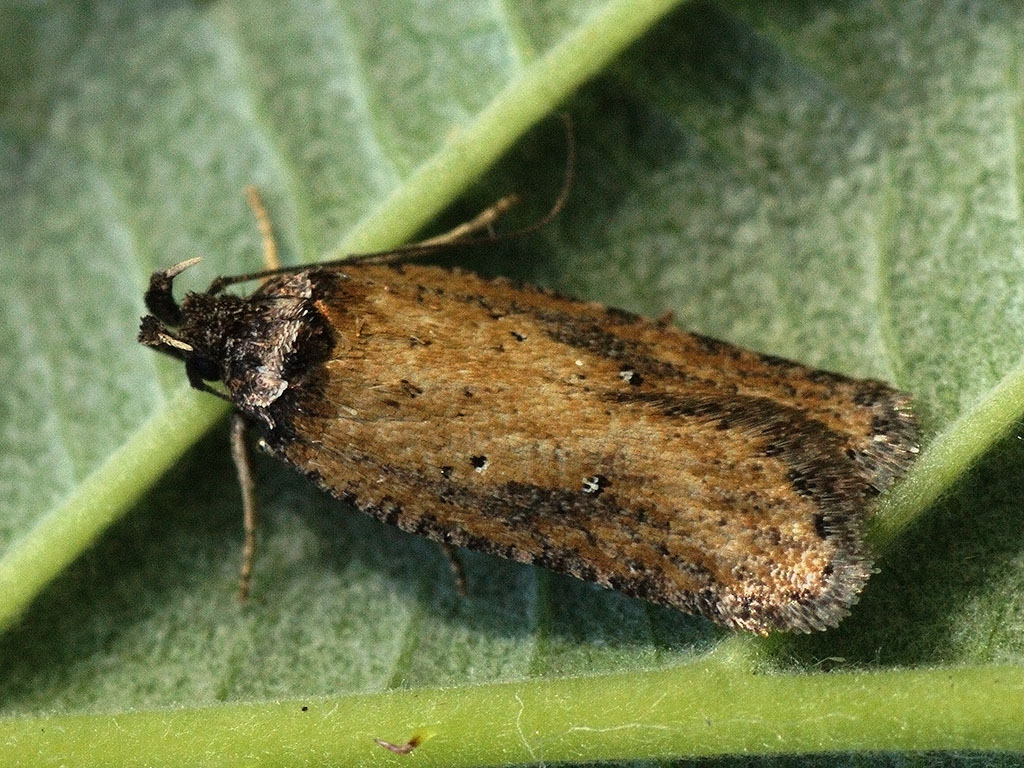

Scientific classification
- Kingdom: Animalia
- Phylum: Arthropoda
- Clade: Pancrustacea
- Class: Insecta
- Order: Lepidoptera
- Family: Depressariidae
- Genus: Exaeretia
- Species: E. praeustella

Binomial name
- Exaeretia praeustella (Rebel, 1917)

Synonyms
- Depressaria praeustella Rebel, 1917

= Exaeretia praeustella =

Species of moth

Exaeretia praeustella is a moth of the family Depressariidae. It is found in Sweden, Finland, the Baltic region, Ukraine, Russia and Mongolia.

The wingspan is 16–19 mm. Adults have been recorded in June and August.
