= Exaeretia bignatha =

Scientific classification
- Kingdom: Animalia
- Phylum: Arthropoda
- Clade: Pancrustacea
- Class: Insecta
- Order: Lepidoptera
- Family: Depressariidae
- Genus: Exaeretia
- Species: E. bignatha

Binomial name
- Exaeretia bignatha S.X. Wang & Z. Zheng, 1998

Species of moth

Exaeretia bignatha is a moth in the family Depressariidae. It was described by Shu-Xia Wang and Zhe-Min Zheng in 1998. It is found in China (Heilongjiang).
