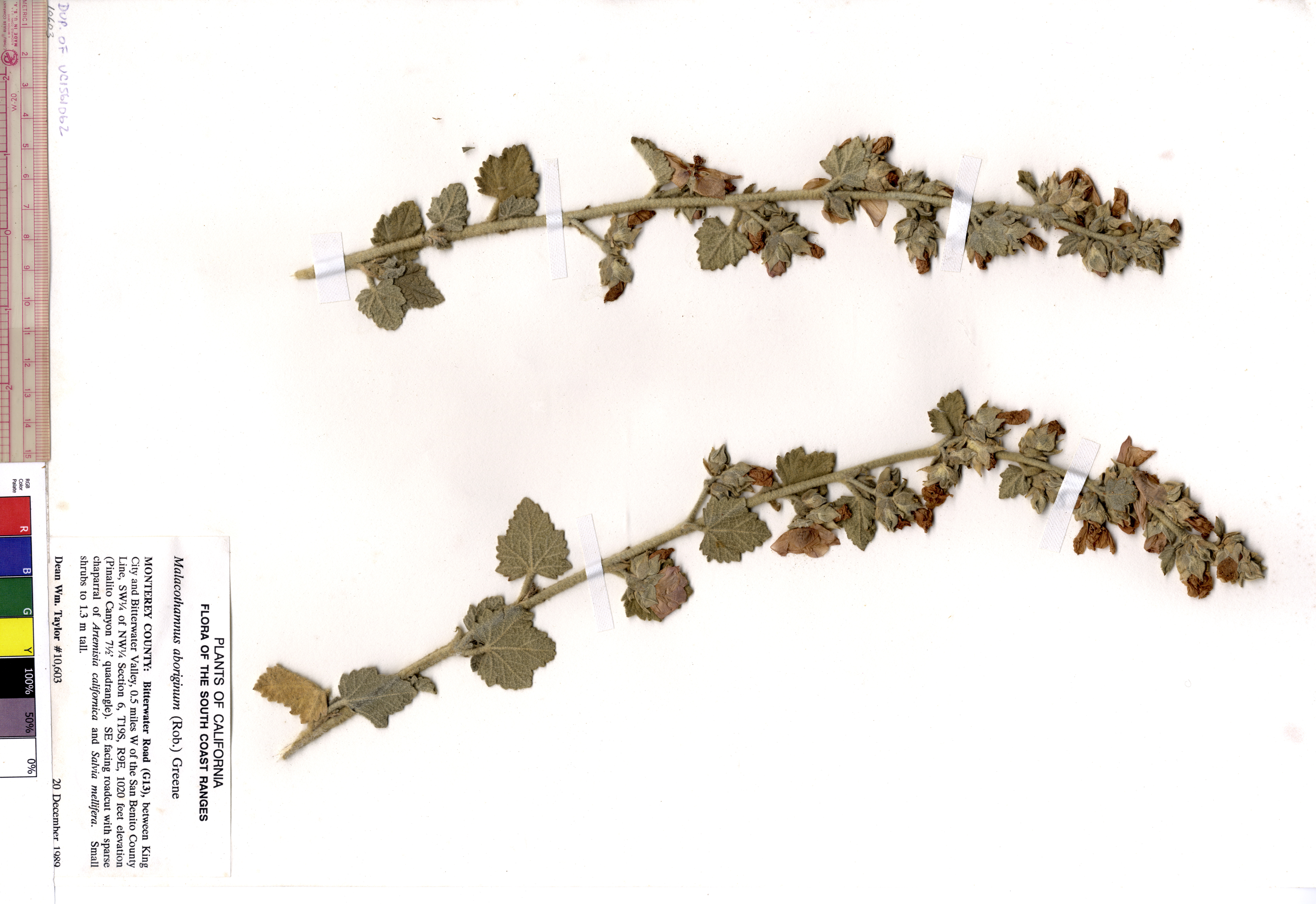
- Samples of Malacothamnus aboriginum

Conservation status
- Vulnerable (NatureServe)

Scientific classification
- Kingdom: Plantae
- Clade: Tracheophytes
- Clade: Angiosperms
- Clade: Eudicots
- Clade: Rosids
- Order: Malvales
- Family: Malvaceae
- Genus: Malacothamnus
- Species: M. aboriginum

Binomial name
- Malacothamnus aboriginum (B.L.Rob.) Greene

Synonyms
- Malvastrum aboriginum B.L.Rob.; Sphaeralcea aboriginum (B.L.Rob.) Jeps.

= Malacothamnus aboriginum =

Species of flowering plant

Malacothamnus aboriginum is a species of flowering plant in the mallow family known by the common name Indian Valley bushmallow. It is endemic to the southern Coastal Ranges of California, primarily in the southern half of the Diablo Range and the Gabilan Range. Plants from San Diego County called Malacothamnus aboriginum in the past were described as the new species Malacothamnus enigmaticus in 2019.
