= Exaeretia ascetica =

Scientific classification
- Kingdom: Animalia
- Phylum: Arthropoda
- Clade: Pancrustacea
- Class: Insecta
- Order: Lepidoptera
- Family: Depressariidae
- Genus: Exaeretia
- Species: E. ascetica

Binomial name
- Exaeretia ascetica (Meyrick, 1926)

Synonyms
- Depressaria ascetica Meyrick, 1926

Species of moth

Exaeretia ascetica is a moth in the family Depressariidae. It was described by Edward Meyrick in 1926. It is found in Colombia.

The wingspan is about 20 mm. The forewings are pale greyish ochreous, slightly sprinkled grey, streaked posteriorly between the veins with dull flesh colour and with a dark grey dot on the base of the costa, as well as a few dots of blackish scales on some veins on the costal half. The discal stigmata are blackish and there is a marginal series of dark grey dots around the apical part of the costa and termen. The hindwings are pale greyish.
