= Exaeretia mongolicella =

Scientific classification
- Kingdom: Animalia
- Phylum: Arthropoda
- Clade: Pancrustacea
- Class: Insecta
- Order: Lepidoptera
- Family: Depressariidae
- Genus: Exaeretia
- Species: E. mongolicella

Binomial name
- Exaeretia mongolicella (Christoph, 1882)

Synonyms
- Depressaria mongolicella Christoph, 1882; Depressaria leucostictella Rebel, 1917; Depressaria mongolicella ab. rubrella Caradja, 1920; Depressaria mongolicella ab. griseella Caradja, 1920

Species of moth

Exaeretia mongolicella is a moth of the family Depressariidae. It is found in Poland, Lithuania and Russia (Siberia, the Russian Far East and Transbaikalia).

The length of the forewings is 9–10 mm.
