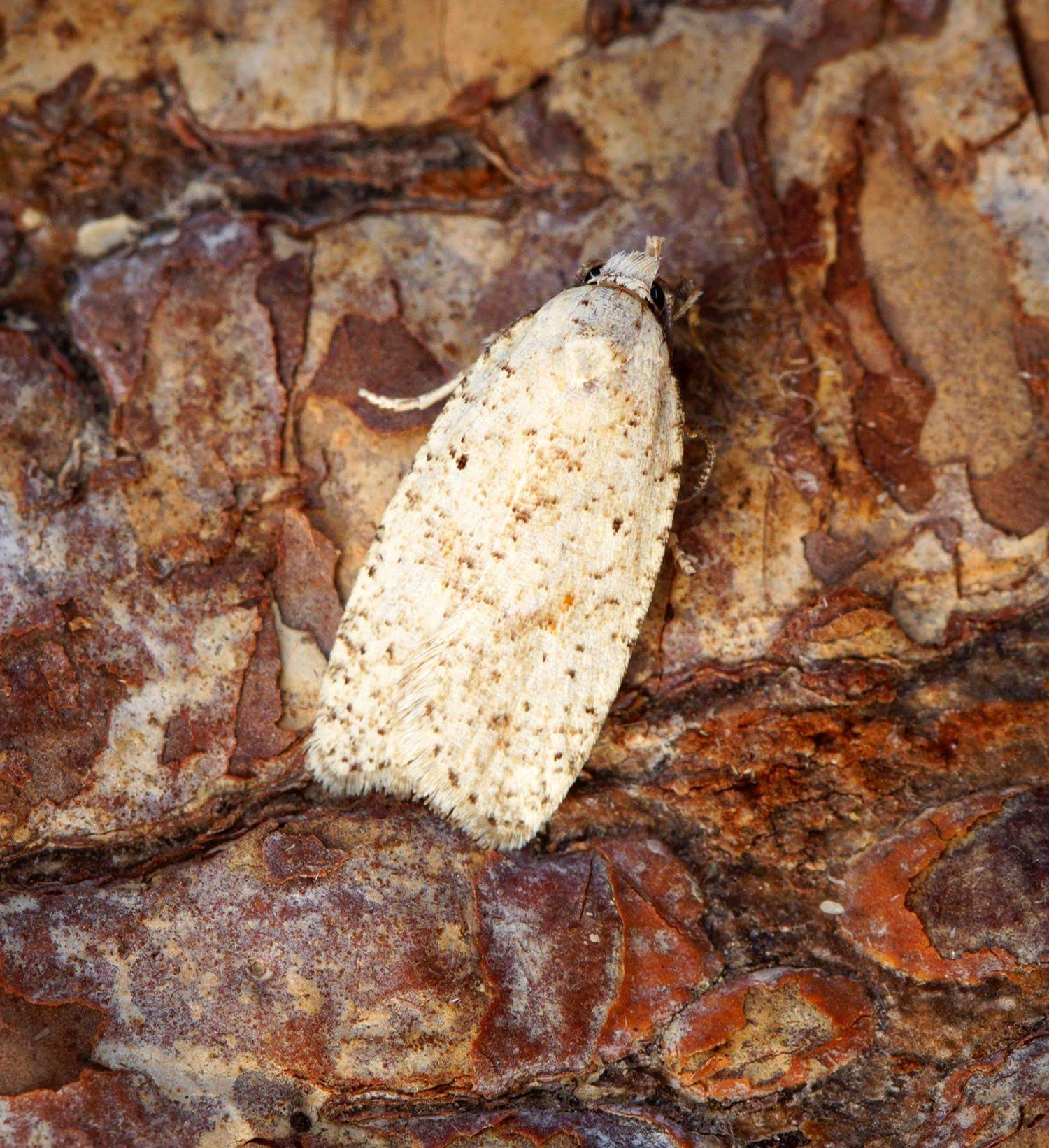

Scientific classification
- Kingdom: Animalia
- Phylum: Arthropoda
- Clade: Pancrustacea
- Class: Insecta
- Order: Lepidoptera
- Family: Depressariidae
- Genus: Exaeretia
- Species: E. preisseckeri

Binomial name
- Exaeretia preisseckeri (Rebel, 1937)

Synonyms
- Depressaria preisseckeri Rebel, 1937; Martyrhilda gozmanyi Balogh, 1951

= Exaeretia preisseckeri =

Species of moth

Exaeretia preisseckeri is a moth of the family Depressariidae. It is found in Italy, Austria, the Czech Republic, Hungary, Romania and Bulgaria.

The wingspan is about 22 mm.
