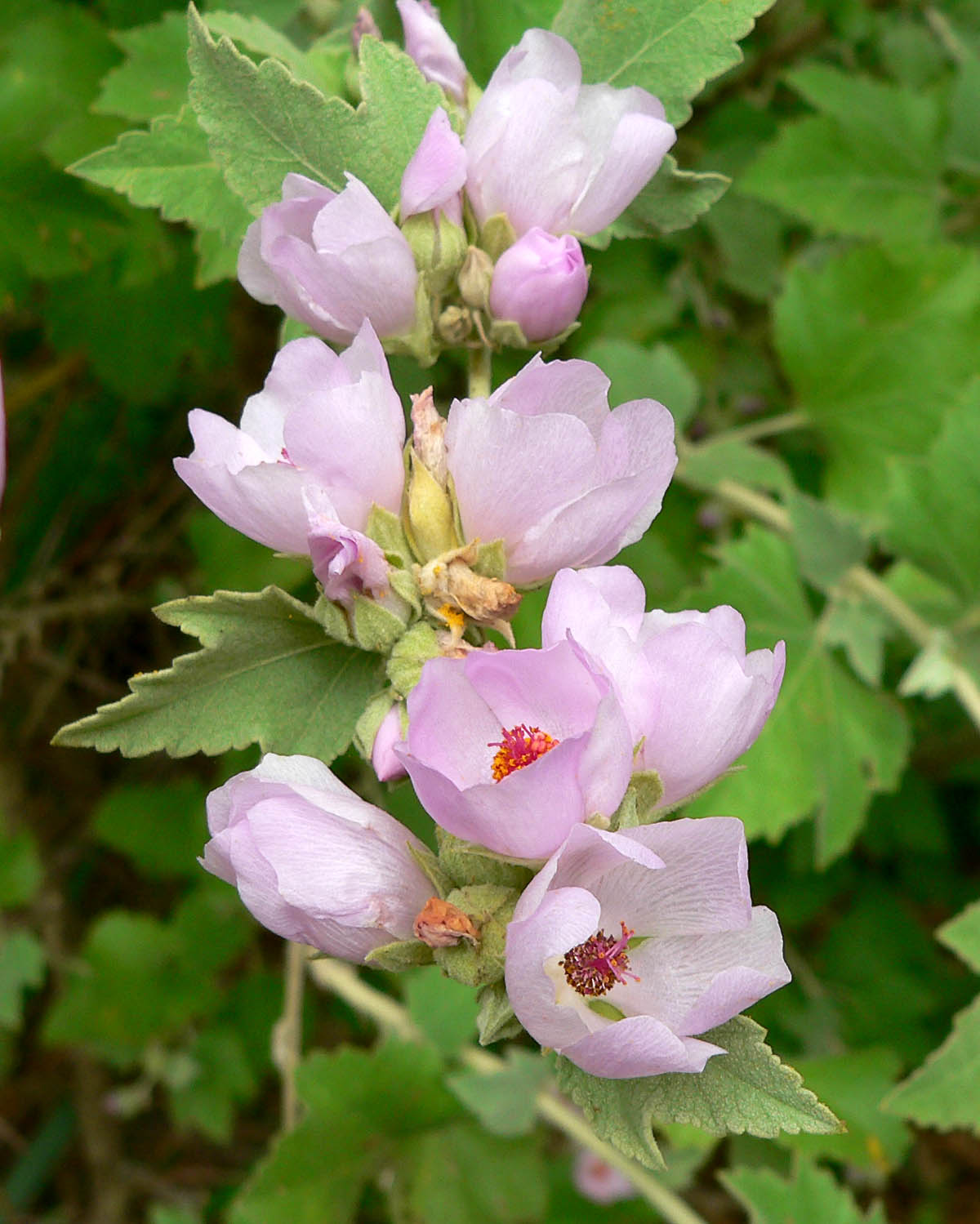
- Malacothamnus nuttallii

Scientific classification
- Kingdom: Plantae
- Clade: Tracheophytes
- Clade: Angiosperms
- Clade: Eudicots
- Clade: Rosids
- Order: Malvales
- Family: Malvaceae
- Subfamily: Malvoideae
- Tribe: Malveae
- Genus: Malacothamnus; Greene

= Malacothamnus =

Genus of shrubs

Malacothamnus (bushmallow) is a genus of shrubs found throughout much of mainland California and on three of the Channel Islands. Outside of California, Malacothamnus is known from the northern half of Baja California and from a few disjunct locations in Arizona and Nevada. Plants of this genus are most commonly found in early-successional, post-burn plant communities. Malacothamnus are currently thought to be most closely related to the Iliamnas of the US interior and the Phymosias of Mexico, Central America, and the Caribbean.

== Taxonomy ==
Taxonomy in the genus Malacothamnus has been controversial due to overlapping morphological variation and differences in opinion about how to treat that variation. The controversy mostly arose from the many taxa included in the CNPS Rare Plant Ranking system that were not included in some treatments of the genus. The most recent treatment used a combination of morphological and phylogenetic analyses to help clarify taxon boundaries and which taxa should be recognized, though some taxa still need further research. This treatment recognizes 21 species and 29 minimum-ranked taxa.

Species included in the most recent treatment of the genus

- Malacothamnus abbottii – Abbott's bushmallow
- Malacothamnus aboriginum – Indian Valley bushmallow
- Malacothamnus arcuatus – bewildering bushmallow, arcuate bushmallow
  - Malacothamnus arcuatus var. arcuatus - western bewildering bushmallow
  - Malacothamnus arcuatus var. elmeri - eastern bewildering bushmallow
- Malacothamnus astrotentaculatus – starry-tentacled bushmallow
- Malacothamnus clementinus – San Clemente Island bushmallow
- Malacothamnus davidsonii – Tujunga bushmallow, Davidson's bushmallow
- Malacothamnus densiflorus – few-rayed bushmallow, many-flowered bushmallow
  - Malacothamnus densiflorus var. densiflorus - few-rayed bushmallow
  - Malacothamnus densiflorus var. viscidus - emerald unicorn bushmallow
- Malacothamnus discombobulatus – discombobulating bushmallow
- Malacothamnus eastwoodiae – Alice’s lovely bushmallow
- Malacothamnus enigmaticus – enigmatic bushmallow
- Malacothamnus fasciculatus – southern coastal bushmallow, chaparral mallow
  - Malacothamnus fasciculatus var. catalinensis - Catalina Island bushmallow
  - Malacothamnus fasciculatus var. fasciculatus - southern coastal bushmallow
  - Malacothamnus fasciculatus var. laxiflorus - splendid bushmallow
  - Malacothamnus fasciculatus var. nesioticus - Santa Cruz Island bushmallow
- Malacothamnus foliosus – Ensenada bushmallow, monarch bushmallow
- Malacothamnus fremontii – unfurled bushmallow, Fremont's bushmallow
  - Malacothamnus fremontii var. elmeri - short-haired unfurled bushmallow
  - Malacothamnus fremontii var. fremontii - long-haired unfurled bushmallow
- Malacothamnus involucratus – Carmel Valley bushmallow
- Malacothamnus jonesii – Jones's bushmallow
  - Malacothamnus jonesii var. gracilis - Huasna bushmallow, slender bushmallow
  - Malacothamnus jonesii var. jonesii - Jones’s bushmallow
  - Malacothamnus jonesii var. niveus - fragrant-snow bushmallow
- Malacothamnus lucianus – Santa Lucia bushmallow, Arroyo Seco bushmallow
- Malacothamnus marrubioides – Santa Clarita bushmallow
- Malacothamnus mendocinensis – Mendocino bushmallow
- Malacothamnus nuttallii – Ojai bushmallow
- Malacothamnus orbiculatus – Tehachapi bushmallow, round-leaved bushmallow
- Malacothamnus palmeri – Cambria bushmallow, Palmer's bushmallow
