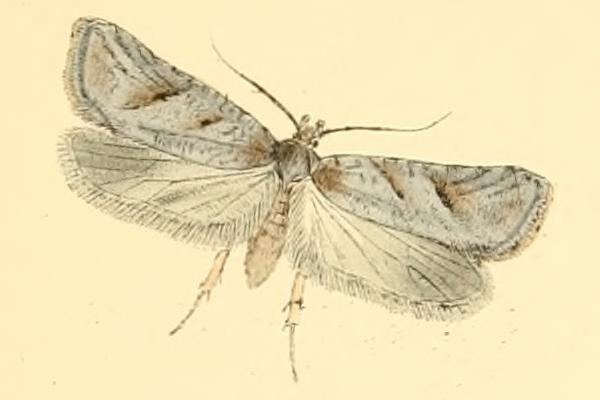
- Exaeretia allisella

Scientific classification
- Kingdom: Animalia
- Phylum: Arthropoda
- Clade: Pancrustacea
- Class: Insecta
- Order: Lepidoptera
- Family: Depressariidae
- Subfamily: Depressariinae
- Genus: Exaeretia; Stainton, 1849

Type species
- Exaeretia allisella Stainton, 1849

Synonyms
- Despressariodes Turati, 1924; Martyrhilda Clarke, 1941

= Exaeretia =

Genus of moths

Exaeretia is a moth genus of the superfamily Gelechioidea. It is placed in the family Depressariidae, which is often – particularly in older treatments – considered a subfamily of Oecophoridae or included in the Elachistidae.

== Selected species ==
- Exaeretia allisella Stainton, 1849
- Exaeretia ammitis (Meyrick, 1931)
- Exaeretia amurella Lvovsky, 1990
- Exaeretia ascetica (Meyrick, 1926)
- Exaeretia boreella Lvovsky, 1990
- Exaeretia bignatha S.X. Wang & Z. Zheng, 1998
- Exaeretia buvati J. Nel, 2014
- Exaeretia canella Busck, 1904
- Exaeretia ciniflonella (Lienig & Zeller, 1846)
- Exaeretia concaviuscula S.X. Wang, 2005
- Exaeretia conciliatella (Rebel, 1892)
- Exaeretia crassispina S.X. Wang, 2005
- Exaeretia culcitella (Herrich-Schaffer, 1854)
- Exaeretia daurella Lvovsky, 1998
- Exaeretia deltata S.X. Wang, 2005
- Exaeretia exornata S.X. Wang & Z. Zheng, 1998
- Exaeretia fulvus Walsingham, 1882
- Exaeretia fuscicostella (Christoph, 1887)
- Exaeretia fuscogriseella Hannemann, 1990
- Exaeretia gracilis Walsingham, 1889
- Exaeretia hermophila (Meyrick, 1922)
- Exaeretia hildaella Clarke, 1941
- Exaeretia indubitatella (Hannemann, 1971)
- Exaeretia kozhantshikovi Lvovsky, 2013
- Exaeretia ledereri (Zeller, 1854)
- Exaeretia lepidella (Christoph, 1872)
- Exaeretia liupanshana S.X. Wang, in Liu & Wang, 2010
- Exaeretia longifolia S.X. Wang, 2005
- Exaeretia lusciosa (Meyrick, 1915)
- Exaeretia lutosella (Herrich-Schaffer, 1854)
- Exaeretia magnignatha S.X. Wang & Z. Zheng, 1998
- Exaeretia mesosceptra (Meyrick, 1915)
- Exaeretia mongolicella (Christoph, 1882)
- Exaeretia montuesellus (Hannemann, 1976)
- Exaeretia nebulosella (Caradja, 1920)
- Exaeretia nechlys Hodges, 1975
- Exaeretia nigromaculata Hannemann, 1989
- Exaeretia nivalis Braun, 1921
- Exaeretia niviferella (Christoph, 1872)
- Exaeretia praeustella (Rebel, 1917)
- Exaeretia preisseckeri (Rebel, 1937)
- Exaeretia qinghaiana S.X. Wang & Zheng, 1996
- Exaeretia relegata (Meyrick, 1920)
- Exaeretia remotella (Hannemann, 1971)
- Exaeretia scabella Zeller, 1873
- Exaeretia significa (Meyrick, 1915)
- Exaeretia sordidella Clarke, 1941
- Exaeretia sutschanensis (Hannemann, 1953)
- Exaeretia thoracefasciella Chambers, 1875
- Exaeretia thoracenigraeella Chambers, 1875
- Exaeretia umbraticostella Walsingham, 1881
- Exaeretia vladimiri Lvovsky, 1984
