= Exaeretia amurella =

Scientific classification
- Kingdom: Animalia
- Phylum: Arthropoda
- Clade: Pancrustacea
- Class: Insecta
- Order: Lepidoptera
- Family: Depressariidae
- Genus: Exaeretia
- Species: E. amurella

Binomial name
- Exaeretia amurella Lvovsky, 1990

Species of moth

Exaeretia amurella is a moth in the family Depressariidae. It was described by Alexandr L. Lvovsky in 1990. It is found in southern Siberia, Buryatia, Transbaikalia and northern Mongolia.
