= Exaeretia hildaella =

Scientific classification
- Kingdom: Animalia
- Phylum: Arthropoda
- Clade: Pancrustacea
- Class: Insecta
- Order: Lepidoptera
- Family: Depressariidae
- Genus: Exaeretia
- Species: E. hildaella

Binomial name
- Exaeretia hildaella (J. F. G. Clarke, 1941)

Synonyms
- Martyrhilda hildaella Clarke, 1941; Depressariodes hildaella

Species of moth

Exaeretia hildaella is a moth in the family Depressariidae. It was described by John Frederick Gates Clarke in 1941. It is found in North America, where it has been recorded from Alberta and the Northwest Territories.

The wingspan is 16–20 mm. The forewings are strongly irrorated (sprinkled) with contrasting black spots, especially along the veins and the base is sordid (dirty) whitish, diffused along the costa to slightly beyond the basal third. There is a conspicuous black spot in the light basal patch slightly below the costa and beyond the basal patch is a transverse dark fuscous dash. It is followed by sordid whitish or cinereous (ash grey) in the apical third and is narrowly diffused along the costa to the apex. There is a conspicuous small black discal spot at the middle of the cell and a white discal spot at end of the cell, which is edged with black. Above and below this spot is considerable black scaling fusing with the brownish-ochreous shade. There is also a series of blackish dashes from the apical third of the costa, around the termen to inner the margin, edged inwardly and narrowly with pale yellowish brown. The hindwings are shining greyish fuscous.
