= Exaeretia concaviuscula =

Scientific classification
- Kingdom: Animalia
- Phylum: Arthropoda
- Clade: Pancrustacea
- Class: Insecta
- Order: Lepidoptera
- Family: Depressariidae
- Genus: Exaeretia
- Species: E. concaviuscula

Binomial name
- Exaeretia concaviuscula S.X. Wang, 2005

Species of moth

Exaeretia concaviuscula is a moth in the family Depressariidae. It was described by S.X. Wang in 2005. It is found in China (Gansu).
