= Exaeretia hermophila =

Scientific classification
- Kingdom: Animalia
- Phylum: Arthropoda
- Clade: Pancrustacea
- Class: Insecta
- Order: Lepidoptera
- Family: Depressariidae
- Genus: Exaeretia
- Species: E. hermophila

Binomial name
- Exaeretia hermophila (Meyrick, 1922)

Synonyms
- Depressaria hermophila Meyrick, 1922

Species of moth

Exaeretia hermophila is a moth in the family Depressariidae. It was described by Edward Meyrick in 1922. It is found in Guinea.

The wingspan is about 18 mm. The forewings are pale yellow ochreous, here and there slightly brownish tinged, with a few scattered fuscous and dark fuscous scales and a somewhat excurved transverse blackish-grey streak almost at the base. There is a small blackish-grey mark on the costa at one-fourth and a flattened-triangular blackish-grey blotch extending on the costa from the middle to three-fourths, and reaching one-third across the wing. The first discal stigma is indicated by some light brownish suffusion and a few dark grey scales, the second by a whitish dot. The hindwings are light grey.
