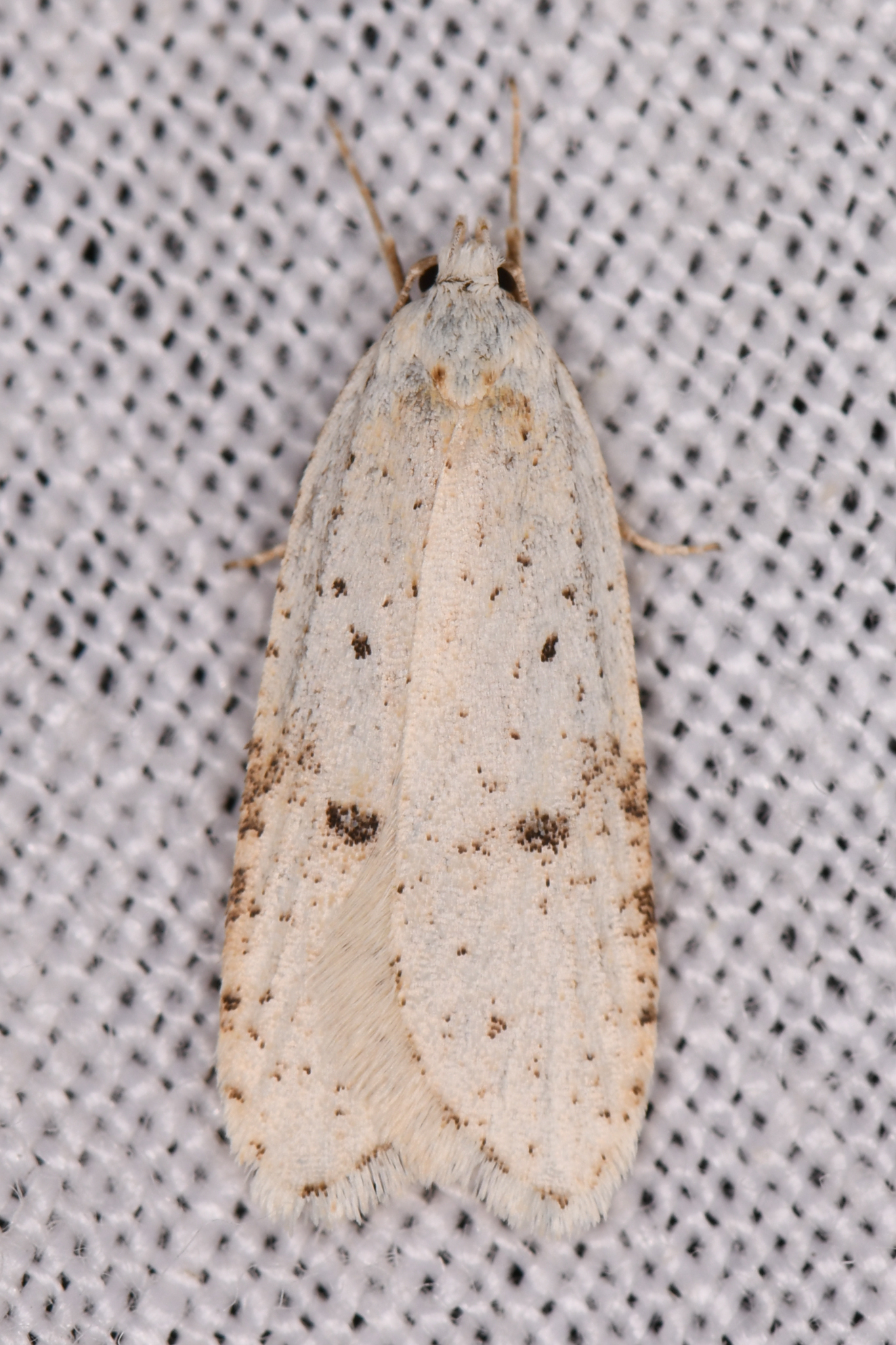

Scientific classification
- Kingdom: Animalia
- Phylum: Arthropoda
- Clade: Pancrustacea
- Class: Insecta
- Order: Lepidoptera
- Family: Depressariidae
- Genus: Exaeretia
- Species: E. nivalis

Binomial name
- Exaeretia nivalis (Braun, 1921)

Synonyms
- Agonopteryx nivalis Braun, 1921; Depressariodes nivalis; Martyrhilda jacobi McDunnough, 1944

= Exaeretia nivalis =

Species of moth

Exaeretia nivalis is a species of moth in the family Depressariidae. It is found in North America, where it has been recorded from Montana, Wyoming, Washington, British Columbia and Alberta.

== Description ==
The wingspan is 21–23 mm. The forewings are white, with a faint light-brown shade slightly beyond the base, in the inner angle and along the inner margin. There are two discal spots at the basal third and another, larger white-centered discal spot at the end of the cell. There is a series of spots along the costa and around the termen, as well as sparse fuscous to blackish fuscous irrorations over the entire surface of the forewing. The hindwings are white.
