= Exaeretia remotella =

Scientific classification
- Kingdom: Animalia
- Phylum: Arthropoda
- Clade: Pancrustacea
- Class: Insecta
- Order: Lepidoptera
- Family: Depressariidae
- Genus: Exaeretia
- Species: E. remotella

Binomial name
- Exaeretia remotella (Hannemann, 1971)

Synonyms
- Martyrhilda remotella Hannemann, 1971

Species of moth

Exaeretia remotella is a moth in the family Depressariidae. It was described by Hans-Joachim Hannemann in 1971. It is found in Mongolia.
