= Exaeretia montuesellus =

Scientific classification
- Kingdom: Animalia
- Phylum: Arthropoda
- Clade: Pancrustacea
- Class: Insecta
- Order: Lepidoptera
- Family: Depressariidae
- Genus: Exaeretia
- Species: E. montuesellus

Binomial name
- Exaeretia montuesellus (Hannemann, 1976)

Synonyms
- Depressariodes montuesellus Hannemann, 1976

Species of moth

Exaeretia montuesellus is a moth in the family Depressariidae. It was described by Hans-Joachim Hannemann in 1976. It is found in Afghanistan and Turkmenistan.
