= Exaeretia ammitis =

Scientific classification
- Kingdom: Animalia
- Phylum: Arthropoda
- Clade: Pancrustacea
- Class: Insecta
- Order: Lepidoptera
- Family: Depressariidae
- Genus: Exaeretia
- Species: E. ammitis

Binomial name
- Exaeretia ammitis (Meyrick, 1931)

Synonyms
- Depressaria ammitis Meyrick, 1931

Species of moth

Exaeretia ammitis is a moth in the family Depressariidae. It was described by Edward Meyrick in 1931. It is found in Argentina.
