= Exaeretia buvati =

Scientific classification
- Kingdom: Animalia
- Phylum: Arthropoda
- Clade: Pancrustacea
- Class: Insecta
- Order: Lepidoptera
- Family: Depressariidae
- Genus: Exaeretia
- Species: E. buvati

Binomial name
- Exaeretia buvati J. Nel, 2014

Species of moth

Exaeretia buvati is a moth in the family Depressariidae. It was described by Jacques Nel in 2014. It is found in Pyrénées-Orientales in France.
