= Exaeretia nigromaculata =

Scientific classification
- Kingdom: Animalia
- Phylum: Arthropoda
- Clade: Pancrustacea
- Class: Insecta
- Order: Lepidoptera
- Family: Depressariidae
- Genus: Exaeretia
- Species: E. nigromaculata

Binomial name
- Exaeretia nigromaculata Hannemann, 1989

Species of moth

Exaeretia nigromaculata is a moth of the family Depressariidae. It is found in Greece, Turkey and western Tajikistan.
