= Exaeretia qinghaiana =

Scientific classification
- Kingdom: Animalia
- Phylum: Arthropoda
- Clade: Pancrustacea
- Class: Insecta
- Order: Lepidoptera
- Family: Depressariidae
- Genus: Exaeretia
- Species: E. qinghaiana

Binomial name
- Exaeretia qinghaiana S.X. Wang & Z. Zheng, 1996

Species of moth

Exaeretia qinghaiana is a moth in the family Depressariidae. It was described by S.X. Wang and Z. Zheng in 1996. It is found in China (Qinghai).
