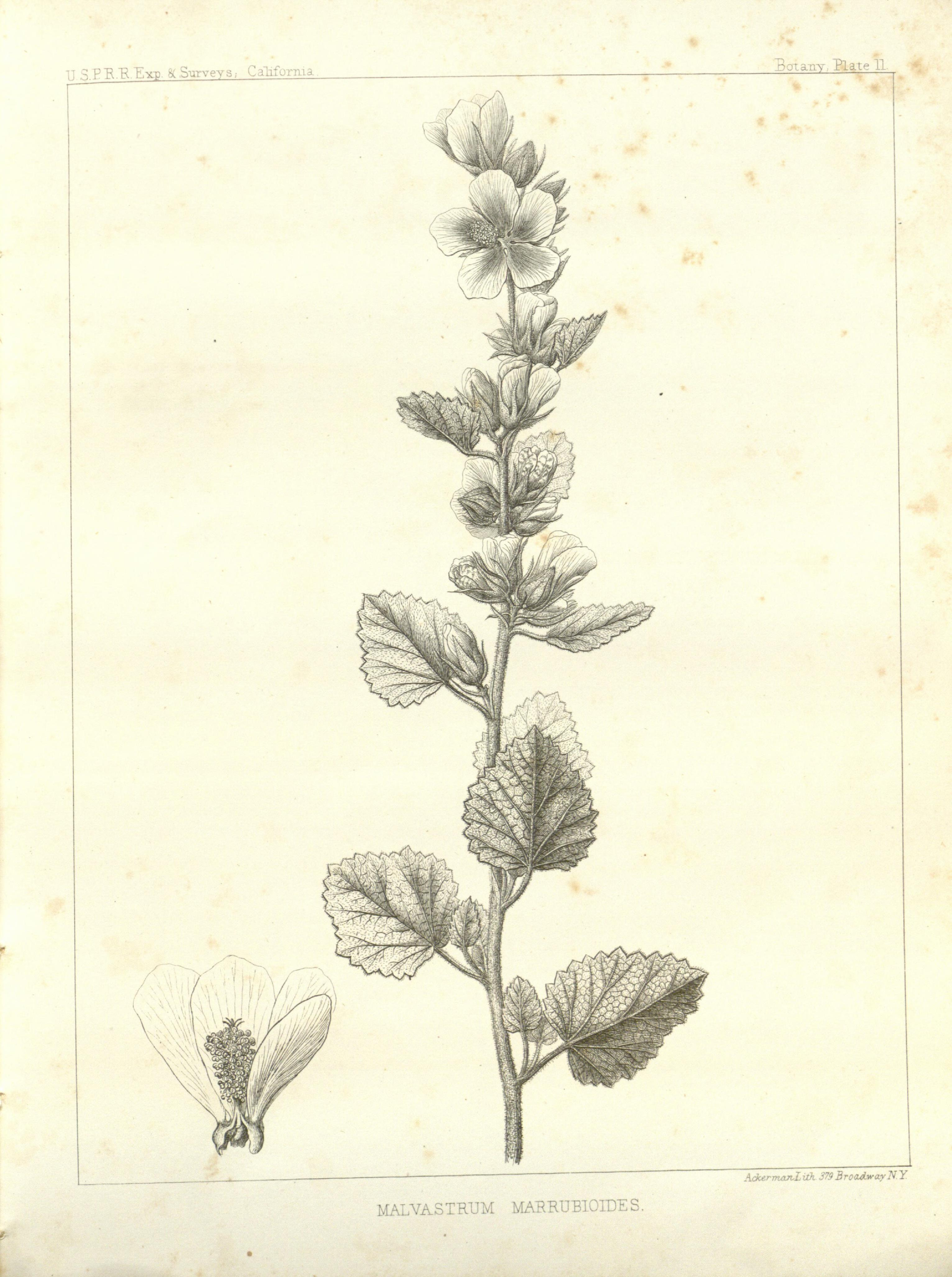
- Malacothamnus marrubioides

Conservation status
- Vulnerable (NatureServe)

Scientific classification
- Kingdom: Plantae
- Clade: Tracheophytes
- Clade: Angiosperms
- Clade: Eudicots
- Clade: Rosids
- Order: Malvales
- Family: Malvaceae
- Genus: Malacothamnus
- Species: M. marrubioides

Binomial name
- Malacothamnus marrubioides (Durand & Hilg.) Greene

= Malacothamnus marrubioides =

Species of flowering plant

Malacothamnus marrubioides is a species of flowering plant in the mallow family known by the common name Santa Clarita bushmallow. It is currently only known from Los Angeles and Ventura counties in California, though its purported type locality suggests it may have occurred further north under or near what is now Millerton Lake.
