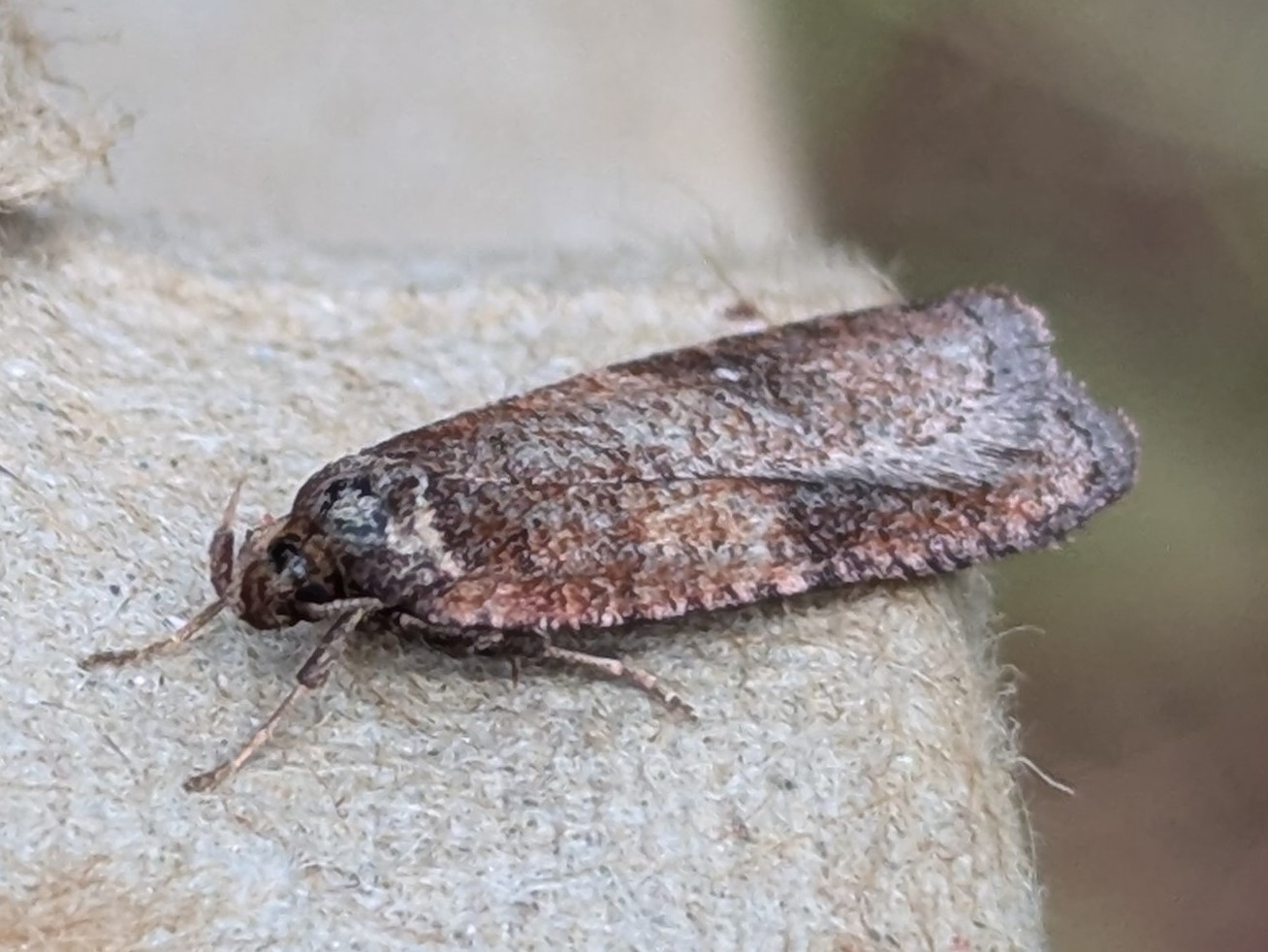

Scientific classification
- Kingdom: Animalia
- Phylum: Arthropoda
- Clade: Pancrustacea
- Class: Insecta
- Order: Lepidoptera
- Family: Depressariidae
- Genus: Exaeretia
- Species: E. fulvus

Binomial name
- Exaeretia fulvus (Walsingham, 1882)

Synonyms
- List: Depressaria fulva Walsingham, 1882; Exaeretia fulva; Depressariodes fulvus; Depressariodes fulva; Martyrhilda fulva; Depressaria endryopa Meyrick, 1918

= Exaeretia fulvus =

Species of moth

Exaeretia fulvus is a species of moth in the family Depressariidae. It was first described by Lord Walsingham in 1882. It is found in North America, where it has been recorded from New Brunswick and Maine to British Columbia, south to Arizona and New Mexico.

== Description ==
The wingspan is 16–20 mm. The forewings are tawny red, irrorated with fuscous and with a large fuscous shade at the end of the cell. In the center of this shade is a white discal spot. There is also a small transverse whitish patch at the extreme base of the wing on the inner angle. The veins beyond the cell are marked with fuscous scales. Hindwings are greyish fuscous.
