= Exaeretia indubitatella =

Scientific classification
- Kingdom: Animalia
- Phylum: Arthropoda
- Clade: Pancrustacea
- Class: Insecta
- Order: Lepidoptera
- Family: Depressariidae
- Genus: Exaeretia
- Species: E. indubitatella

Binomial name
- Exaeretia indubitatella (Hannemann, 1971)

Synonyms
- Martyrhilda indubitatella Hannemann, 1971

Species of moth

Exaeretia indubitatella is a moth in the family Depressariidae. It is found in Mongolia and Russia (Altai Mountains, Tuva, Transbaikalia).
