= Exaeretia mesosceptra =

Scientific classification
- Kingdom: Animalia
- Phylum: Arthropoda
- Clade: Pancrustacea
- Class: Insecta
- Order: Lepidoptera
- Family: Depressariidae
- Genus: Exaeretia
- Species: E. mesosceptra

Binomial name
- Exaeretia mesosceptra (Meyrick, 1915)

Synonyms
- Depressaria mesosceptra Meyrick, 1915

Species of moth

Exaeretia mesosceptra is a moth in the family Depressariidae. It was described by Edward Meyrick in 1915. It is found in Peru.

The wingspan is about 21 mm. The forewings are whitish ochreous, with a few scattered blackish specks and a narrow somewhat irregular-edged median fuscous streak irrorated with blackish almost from the base to the apex but not quite reaching either. The hindwings are whitish grey.
