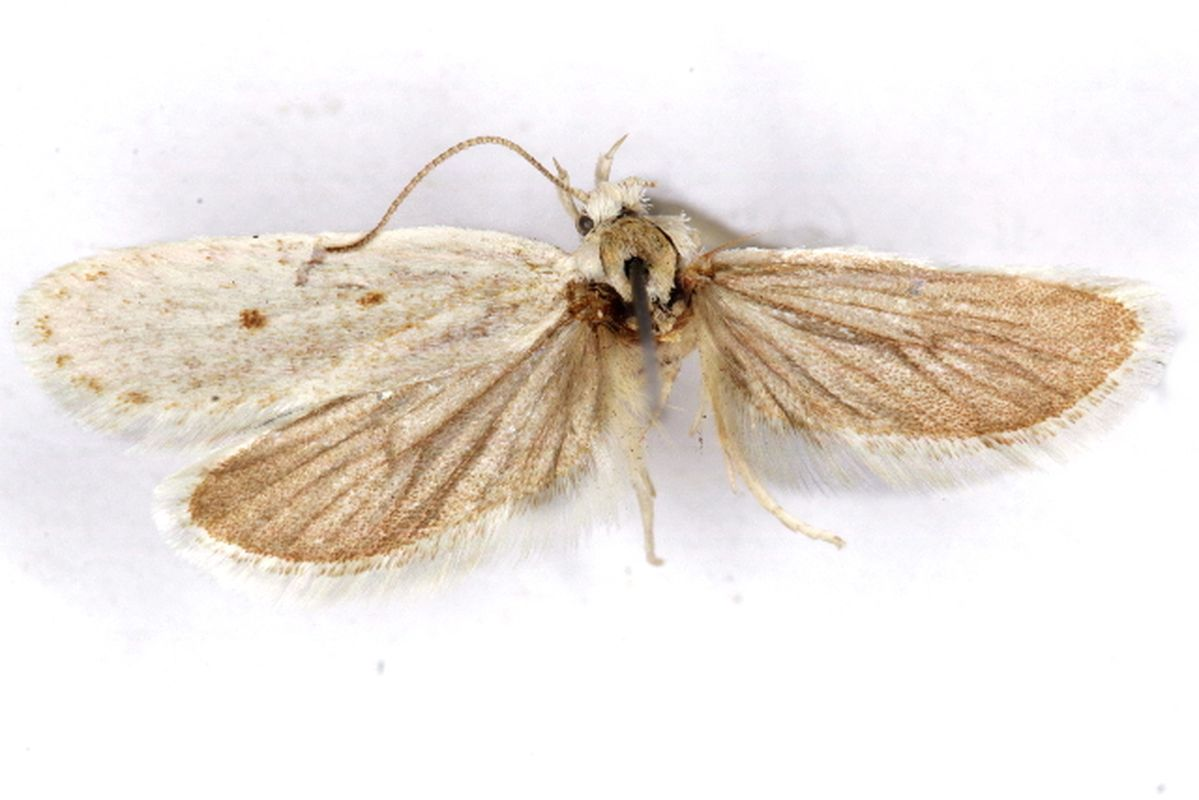

Scientific classification
- Kingdom: Animalia
- Phylum: Arthropoda
- Clade: Pancrustacea
- Class: Insecta
- Order: Lepidoptera
- Family: Depressariidae
- Genus: Exaeretia
- Species: E. sordidella

Binomial name
- Exaeretia sordidella (Clarke, 1941)

Synonyms
- Martyrhilda sordidella Clarke, 1941; Depressariodes sordidella

= Exaeretia sordidella =

Species of moth

Exaeretia sordidella is a moth in the family Depressariidae. It is found in North America, where it has been recorded from British Columbia.

The wingspan is 18–21 mm. The forewings are sordid whitish, irrorated with dull golden yellow and brown. There is a series of indistinct brownish spots from the apical third of the costa around the termen to the inner margin. These spots are mixed with a few dull golden-yellow scales. There is a brown discal spot at the basal third, with an elongate dull golden-yellow patch below it in the fold. There is also a conspicuous brown discal spot at the end of the cell. The hindwings are smoky fuscous.
