= Malacothamnus palmeri =

Conservation status
- Imperiled (NatureServe)

Scientific classification
- Kingdom: Plantae
- Clade: Tracheophytes
- Clade: Angiosperms
- Clade: Eudicots
- Clade: Rosids
- Order: Malvales
- Family: Malvaceae
- Genus: Malacothamnus
- Species: M. palmeri

Binomial name
- Malacothamnus palmeri (S.Watson) Greene

Synonyms
- Malvastrum palmeri (S.Watson)

Species of flowering plant

Malacothamnus palmeri is a species of flowering plant in the mallow family known by the common names Cambria bushmallow and Palmer's bushmallow. It is endemic to San Luis Obispo County, California, where it is known from the Santa Lucia Mountains.

== Taxonomy ==
Malacothamnus palmeri was first described in 1877 as Malvastrum palmeri. In some treatments, Malacothamnus involucratus and Malacothamnus lucianus have been treated as varieties of or synonyms of Malacothamnus palmeri. In 2021 morphological analyses revealed these to be three morphologically and geographically distinct species.

== Identification ==
Malacothamnus palmeri is distinguished from the rest of the genus by the combination of a capitate to subcapitate inflorescence, glandular trichomes <=0.1 mm, and the adaxial (upper) surface of mature leaves having dense stellate trichomes. Malacothamnus palmeri is distinguished from Malacothamnus involucratus by having much denser stellate trichomes on the adaxial surface of mature leaves and by generally having the widest stipular bracts <=6.5 mm wide whereas Malacothamnus involucratus generally has sparse stellate trichomes on the adaxial surface of mature leaves and the widest stipular bracts are generally >=7mm wide. Malacothamnus palmeri is distinguished from Malacothamnus lucianus by having glandular trichomes <0.1 mm and most stellate trichome rays on the stem <1 mm whereas Malacothamnus lucianus has glandular trichomes 0.3-1.4 mm and many stellate trichome rays on the stem 1–3 mm.
