= Exaeretia lusciosa =

Scientific classification
- Kingdom: Animalia
- Phylum: Arthropoda
- Clade: Pancrustacea
- Class: Insecta
- Order: Lepidoptera
- Family: Depressariidae
- Genus: Exaeretia
- Species: E. lusciosa

Binomial name
- Exaeretia lusciosa (Meyrick, 1915)

Synonyms
- Depressaria lusciosa Meyrick, 1915

Species of moth

Exaeretia lusciosa is a moth in the family Depressariidae. It was described by Edward Meyrick in 1915. It is found in Peru and Chile.

The wingspan is 20–21 mm. The forewings are brownish or fuscous, with the tips of the scales whitish, with scattered dark fuscous scales tending to form strigulae, the costa more or less strigulated with blackish. The first discal stigma is blackish, with a less marked dot of brown and blackish scales somewhat beyond and beneath it, the second discal white, without dark edging. The hindwings are pale grey.
