= Exaeretia thoracenigraeella =

Scientific classification
- Kingdom: Animalia
- Phylum: Arthropoda
- Clade: Pancrustacea
- Class: Insecta
- Order: Lepidoptera
- Family: Depressariidae
- Genus: Exaeretia
- Species: E. thoracenigraeella

Binomial name
- Exaeretia thoracenigraeella (Chambers, 1875)

Synonyms
- Gelechia thoracenigraeella Chambers, 1875; Depressariodes thoracenigraeella; Martyrhilda thoracenigraeella; Depressaria novimundi Walsingham, 1881; Depressaria thoracinigrella Meyrick, 1922

Species of moth

Exaeretia thoracenigraeella is a moth in the family Depressariidae. It is found in North America, where it has been recorded from California and Oregon.

The wingspan is 16–20 mm. The forewings are pale ochreous-grey, with a blackish fuscous base. There is a fuscous shade from the costa to the middle of the cell, edged above and below with brown and preceded by a conspicuous outwardly oblique black dash. There is a series of greyish-fuscous spots on the costa and around the termen. The hindwings are brownish fuscous.
