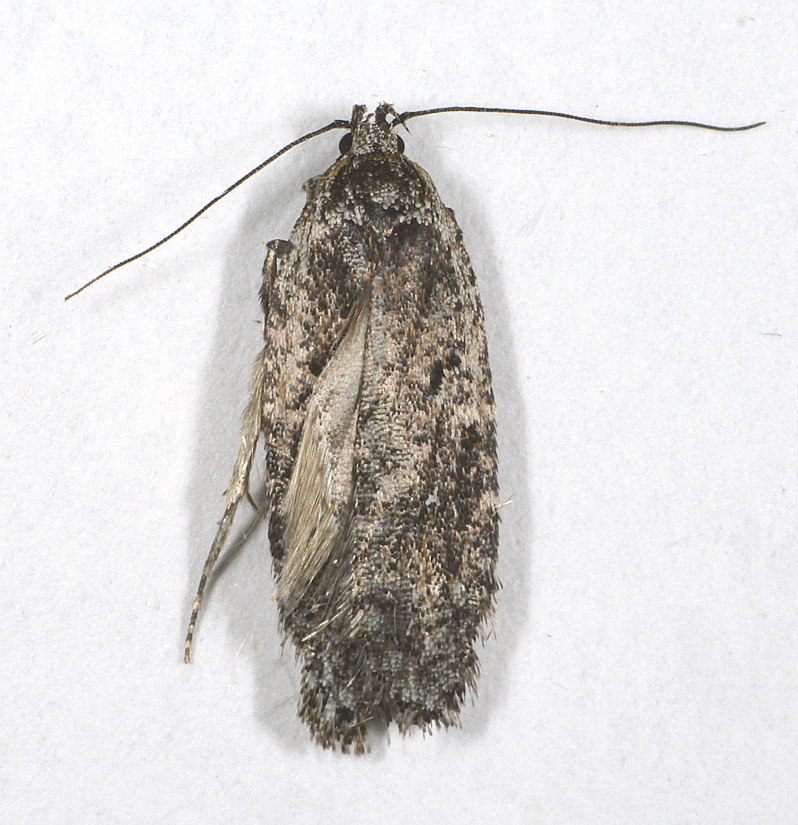

Scientific classification
- Kingdom: Animalia
- Phylum: Arthropoda
- Clade: Pancrustacea
- Class: Insecta
- Order: Lepidoptera
- Family: Depressariidae
- Genus: Exaeretia
- Species: E. ciniflonella

Binomial name
- Exaeretia ciniflonella (Lienig & Zeller, 1846)

Synonyms
- Exaeretia klamathianus Walsingham, 1881; Exaeretia ciniflonella ab. kusnezovi Krulikowsky, 1908; Exaeretia smolandiae Palm, 1943; Exaeretia isa Clarke, 1947; Depressariodes ciniflonella

= Exaeretia ciniflonella =

Species of moth

Exaeretia ciniflonella is a species of moth of the family Depressariidae. It is found from Great Britain to Fennoscandia, south through Germany to Italy, east through Austria, Poland and the Baltic region to the eastern parts of the Palearctic realm. It is also present in western North America.

The wingspan is 17–24 mm. Adults are on wing from July to August and overwinter. They sometimes appear again in the early spring.

The larvae feed on Betula, Populus and Salix species in a rolled or folded leaf.
