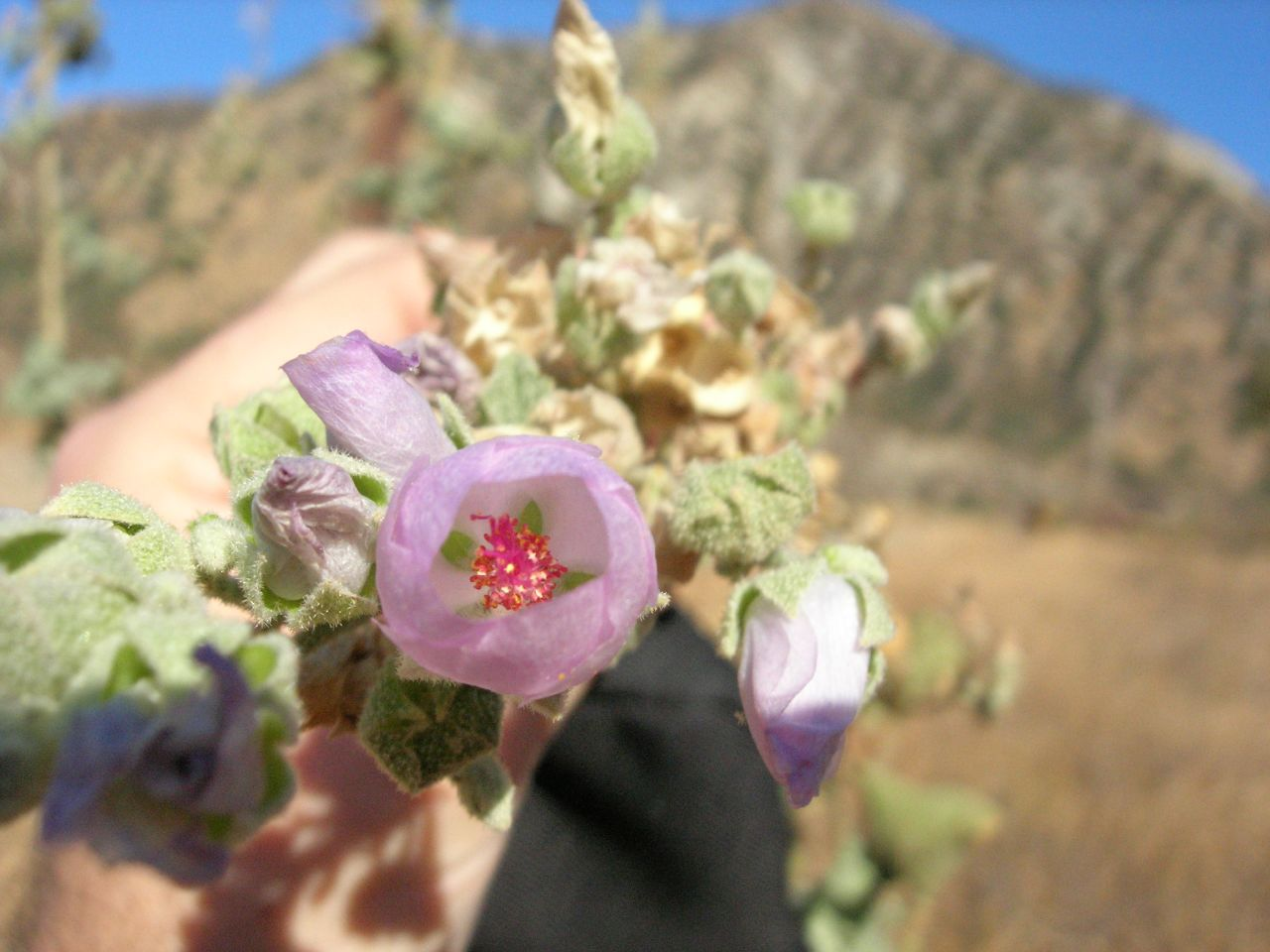

Conservation status
- Imperiled (NatureServe)

Scientific classification
- Kingdom: Plantae
- Clade: Tracheophytes
- Clade: Angiosperms
- Clade: Eudicots
- Clade: Rosids
- Order: Malvales
- Family: Malvaceae
- Genus: Malacothamnus
- Species: M. davidsonii

Binomial name
- Malacothamnus davidsonii (B.L.Rob.) Greene

Synonyms
- Malvastrum davidsonii (B.L.Rob.)

= Malacothamnus davidsonii =

Species of flowering plant

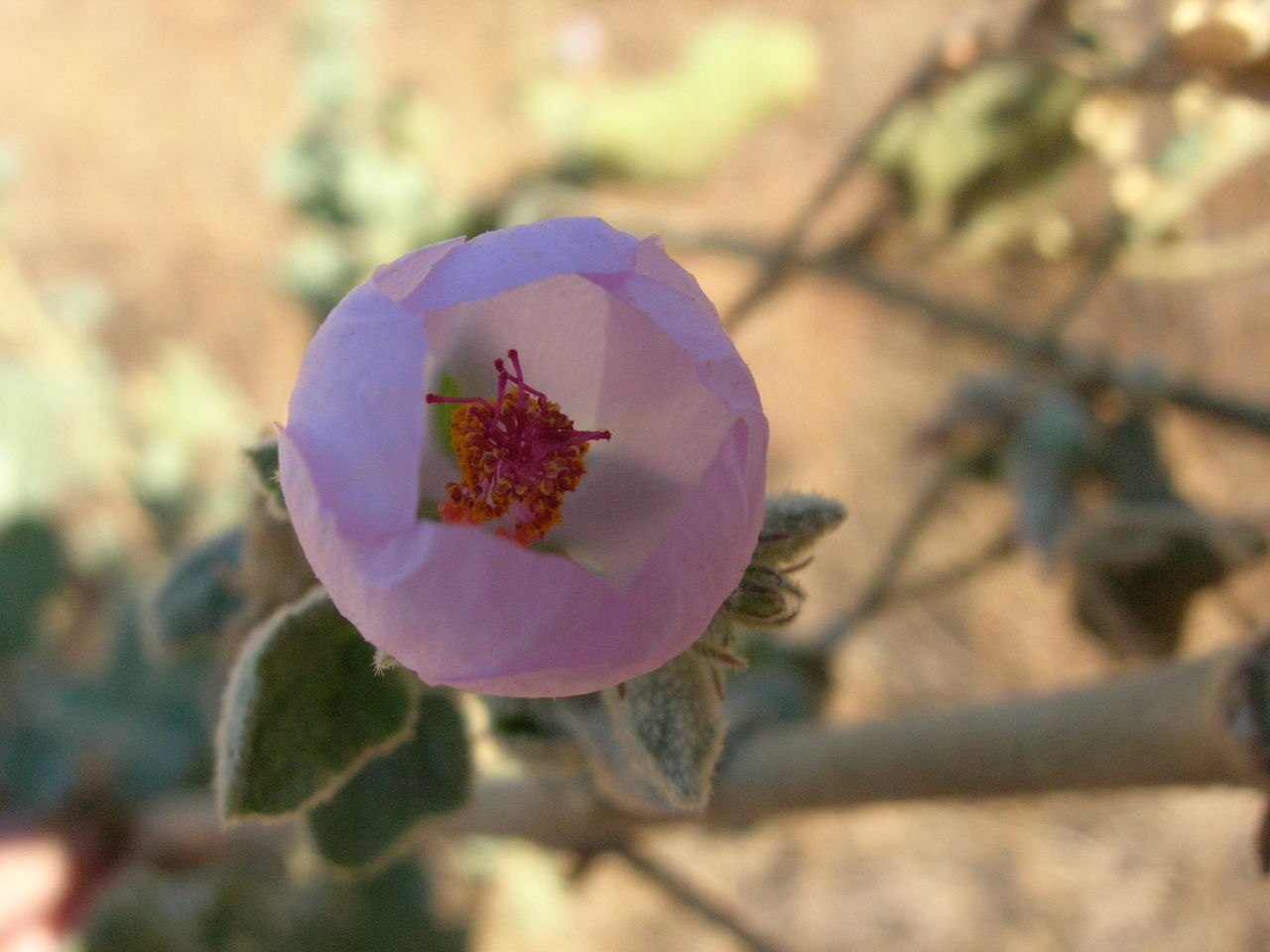
Malacothamnus davidsonii in Pacoima Canyon, Los Angeles County

Malacothamnus davidsonii is a species of flowering plant in the mallow family known by the common names Tujunga bushmallow and Davidson's bushmallow. It is endemic to Los Angeles County, California, where it primary occurs in and near Big Tujunga Canyon, Little Tujunga Canyon, and Tujunga Wash. The common name Tujunga bushmallow alludes to its geographic distribution. Plants of what has historically been considered Malacothamnus davidsonii from Monterey and San Luis Obispo counties in California were described as the new species Malacothamnus discombobulatus in 2023 based on phylogenetic, morphological, and geographic evidence.

== Identification ==
Malacothamnus discombobulatus and M. davidsonii are generally separated from the rest of Malacothamnus based on the combination of relatively short calyx bracts, relatively long stellate trichome rays, often relatively large size of the fully grown plant, and a relatively late blooming period. Malacothamnus discombobulatus and M. davidsonii are most easily distinguished from each other based on their geographic ranges.

== See also ==
- California chaparral and woodlands — ecoregion.
- Flora of the California chaparral and woodlands
