= Exaeretia sutschanensis =

Scientific classification
- Kingdom: Animalia
- Phylum: Arthropoda
- Clade: Pancrustacea
- Class: Insecta
- Order: Lepidoptera
- Family: Depressariidae
- Genus: Exaeretia
- Species: E. sutschanensis

Binomial name
- Exaeretia sutschanensis (Hannemann, 1953)

Synonyms
- Matyrhilda sutschanensis Hannemann, 1953

Species of moth

Exaeretia sutschanensis is a moth in the family Depressariidae. It was described by Hans-Joachim Hannemann in 1953. It is found in Afghanistan, the Russian Far East (Ussuri) and Korea.
