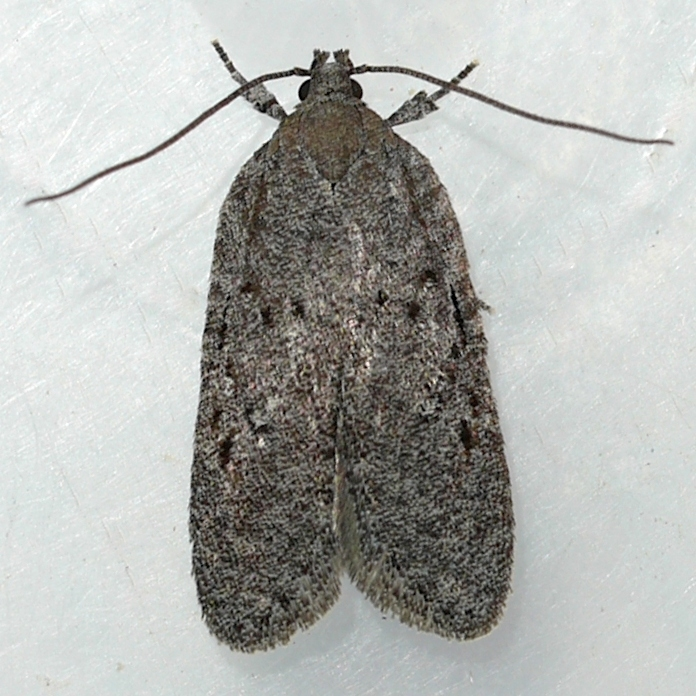

Scientific classification
- Kingdom: Animalia
- Phylum: Arthropoda
- Clade: Pancrustacea
- Class: Insecta
- Order: Lepidoptera
- Family: Depressariidae
- Genus: Exaeretia
- Species: E. scabella

Binomial name
- Exaeretia scabella (Zeller, 1873)

Synonyms
- Deperssaria scabella Zeller, 1873; Martyrhilda scabella; Depressariodes scabella

= Exaeretia scabella =

Species of moth

Exaeretia scabella is a moth in the family Depressariidae. It is found in North America, where it has been recorded from Ohio.

The wingspan is 24 mm.
