= Malacothamnus astrotentaculatus =

Conservation status
- Imperiled (NatureServe)

Scientific classification
- Kingdom: Plantae
- Clade: Tracheophytes
- Clade: Angiosperms
- Clade: Eudicots
- Clade: Rosids
- Order: Malvales
- Family: Malvaceae
- Genus: Malacothamnus
- Species: M. astrotentaculatus

Binomial name
- Malacothamnus astrotentaculatus K.Morse

Species of flowering plant

Malacothamnus astrotentaculatus is a species of flowering plant in the mallow family known by the common name starry-tentacled bushmallow. It is named after the somewhat tentacle-like outgrowths on the calyx that are covered in stellate trichomes. It is endemic to Shasta and Tehama counties in California.

== Identification ==
Malacothamnus astrotentaculatus is distinguished from the rest of the genus by the combination of linear calyx bracts, calyx lobes generally much wider above the base than at the base, and a spike-like inflorescence.
