= Exaeretia relegata =

Scientific classification
- Kingdom: Animalia
- Phylum: Arthropoda
- Clade: Pancrustacea
- Class: Insecta
- Order: Lepidoptera
- Family: Depressariidae
- Genus: Exaeretia
- Species: E. relegata

Binomial name
- Exaeretia relegata (Meyrick, 1920)

Synonyms
- Depressaria relegata Meyrick, 1920

Species of moth

Exaeretia relegata is a moth in the family Depressariidae. It was described by Edward Meyrick in 1920. It is found on the Juan Fernandez Islands.
