= Exaeretia liupanshana =

Scientific classification
- Kingdom: Animalia
- Phylum: Arthropoda
- Clade: Pancrustacea
- Class: Insecta
- Order: Lepidoptera
- Family: Depressariidae
- Genus: Exaeretia
- Species: E. liupanshana

Binomial name
- Exaeretia liupanshana Liu & Wang, 2010

Species of moth

Exaeretia liupanshana is a moth in the family Depressariidae. It is found in China (Ningxia).
