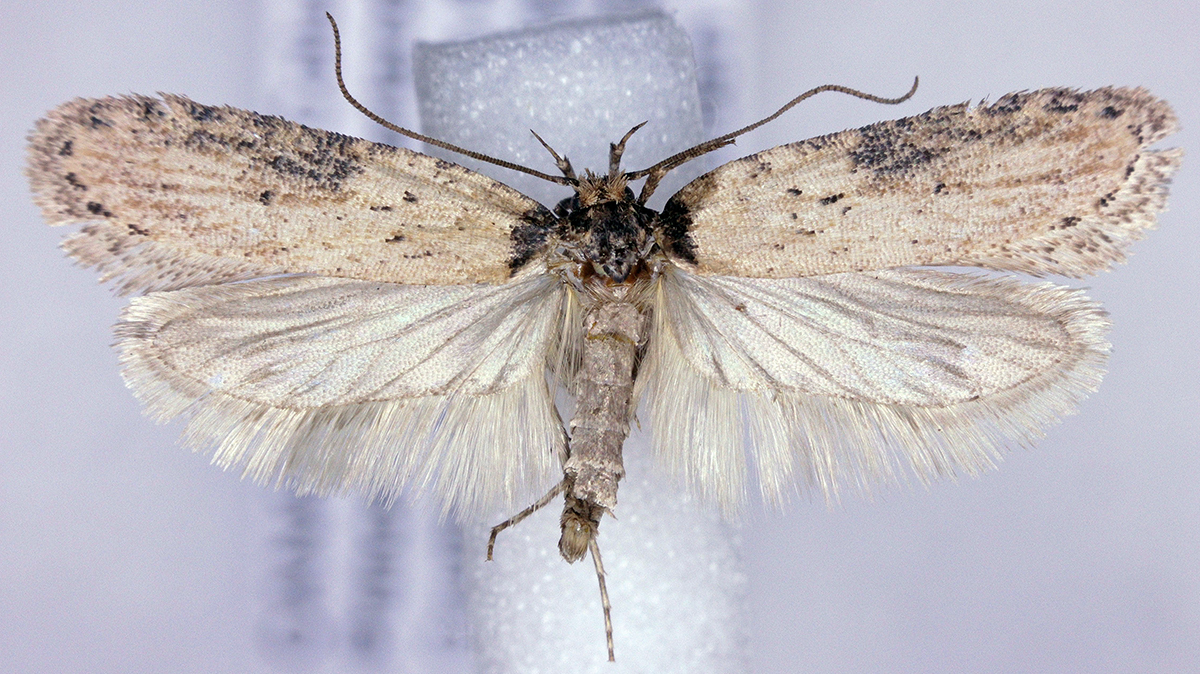

Scientific classification
- Kingdom: Animalia
- Phylum: Arthropoda
- Clade: Pancrustacea
- Class: Insecta
- Order: Lepidoptera
- Family: Depressariidae
- Genus: Exaeretia
- Species: E. umbraticostella

Binomial name
- Exaeretia umbraticostella (Walsingham, 1881)

Synonyms
- Depresaria umbraticostella Walsingham, 1881; Martyrhilda umbraticostella

= Exaeretia umbraticostella =

Species of moth

Exaeretia umbraticostella is a species of moth in the family Depressariidae. It is found in North America, where it has been recorded from South Dakota and British Columbia to Texas and California.

== Description ==
The wingspan is 16–19 mm. The forewings are light reddish ochreous with small diffused blackish-fuscous spots on the costa and around the termen. There is a conspicuous, outwardly diffused blackish-fuscous shade on the middle of the costa, preceded by two minute discal dots of the same colour. There is a light fuscous shade from the costal patch, around the termen to near the middle of the inner margin. The hindwings are shining greyish fuscous.

== Ecology and behaviour ==
The larvae feed on Balsamohirza sagittata and Helianthus pumilus. They feed within tubes, formed from tied terminal leaves.
