= Exaeretia kozhantshikovi =

Scientific classification
- Kingdom: Animalia
- Phylum: Arthropoda
- Clade: Pancrustacea
- Class: Insecta
- Order: Lepidoptera
- Family: Depressariidae
- Genus: Exaeretia
- Species: E. kozhantshikovi

Binomial name
- Exaeretia kozhantshikovi Lvovsky, 2013

Species of moth

Exaeretia kozhantshikovi is a moth in the family Depressariidae. It was described by Alexandr L. Lvovsky in 2013. It is found in central Russia (Krasnoyarsk).
