= Malacothamnus discombobulatus =

Conservation status
- Imperiled (NatureServe)

Scientific classification
- Kingdom: Plantae
- Clade: Tracheophytes
- Clade: Angiosperms
- Clade: Eudicots
- Clade: Rosids
- Order: Malvales
- Family: Malvaceae
- Genus: Malacothamnus
- Species: M. discombobulatus

Binomial name
- Malacothamnus discombobulatus K.Morse

Species of flowering plant

Malacothamnus discombobulatus is a species of flowering plant in the mallow family known by the common name discombobulating bushmallow. It is morphologically similar to Malacothamnus davidsonii and was treated within M. davidsonii in the past. Malacothamnus discombobulatus is named after the confusion sown from its morphological similarity to M. davidsonii. It is endemic to Monterey and San Luis Obispo counties in California.

== Identification ==
Malacothamnus discombobulatus and M. davidsonii are generally separated from the rest of Malacothamnus based on the combination of relatively short calyx bracts, relatively long stellate trichome rays, often relatively large size of the fully grown plant, and a relatively late blooming period. Malacothamnus discombobulatus and M. davidsonii are most easily distinguished from each other based on their geographic ranges.
