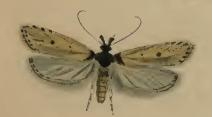

Scientific classification
- Kingdom: Animalia
- Phylum: Arthropoda
- Clade: Pancrustacea
- Class: Insecta
- Order: Lepidoptera
- Family: Depressariidae
- Genus: Exaeretia
- Species: E. culcitella

Binomial name
- Exaeretia culcitella (Herrich-Schäffer, 1854)

Synonyms
- Depressaria culcitella Herrich-Schaffer, 1854

= Exaeretia culcitella =

Species of moth

Exaeretia culcitella is a moth of the family Depressariidae. It is found in Ireland, Germany, the Czech Republic, Austria, Slovakia, Hungary, Italy, North Macedonia and Russia.

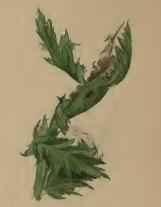
A leaf of Chrysanthemum corymbosum attacked by larva

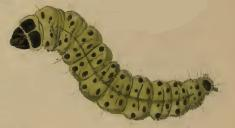
Larva

Adults are on wing from June to July.

The larvae feed on Chrysanthemum corymbosum. Larvae can be found from April to May.
