= Exaeretia ledereri =

Scientific classification
- Kingdom: Animalia
- Phylum: Arthropoda
- Clade: Pancrustacea
- Class: Insecta
- Order: Lepidoptera
- Family: Depressariidae
- Genus: Exaeretia
- Species: E. ledereri

Binomial name
- Exaeretia ledereri (Zeller, 1854)

Synonyms
- Depressaria ledereri Zeller, 1854; Depressaria homochroella Erschoff, 1874; Depressaria xyleuta Meyrick, 1913; Depressaria leviella Amsel, 1935

Species of moth

Exaeretia ledereri is a moth of the family Depressariidae. It is found in Romania and North Macedonia and on Cyprus. It has also been recorded from Turkey, Turkmenistan and Israel.
