= Exaeretia significa =

Scientific classification
- Kingdom: Animalia
- Phylum: Arthropoda
- Clade: Pancrustacea
- Class: Insecta
- Order: Lepidoptera
- Family: Depressariidae
- Genus: Exaeretia
- Species: E. significa

Binomial name
- Exaeretia significa (Meyrick, 1915)

Synonyms
- Depressaria significa Meyrick, 1915

Species of moth

Exaeretia significa is a moth in the family Depressariidae. It was described by Edward Meyrick in 1915. It is found in Ecuador.

The wingspan is 19–20 mm. The forewings are brownish mixed with grey, the tips of the scales very finely whitish, with scattered blackish scales tending to form blackish-grey strigulae, the costa and dorsum distinctly strigulated with blackish. The first discal stigma is black, just beyond and beneath it is a short black dash edged above with whitish, the second discal white ringed with blackish, the plical very small, black and beneath the first discal. The hindwings are light grey, darker towards the apex and with the veins darker.
