= Exaeretia nebulosella =

Scientific classification
- Kingdom: Animalia
- Phylum: Arthropoda
- Clade: Pancrustacea
- Class: Insecta
- Order: Lepidoptera
- Family: Depressariidae
- Genus: Exaeretia
- Species: E. nebulosella

Binomial name
- Exaeretia nebulosella (Caradja, 1920)

Synonyms
- Depressaria nebulosella Caradja, 1920

Species of moth

Exaeretia nebulosella is a moth in the family Depressariidae. It was described by Aristide Caradja in 1920. It is found in Russia (Uralsk).
