= Exaeretia fuscicostella =

Scientific classification
- Kingdom: Animalia
- Phylum: Arthropoda
- Clade: Pancrustacea
- Class: Insecta
- Order: Lepidoptera
- Family: Depressariidae
- Genus: Exaeretia
- Species: E. fuscicostella

Binomial name
- Exaeretia fuscicostella (Christoph, 1887)

Synonyms
- Depressaria fuscicostella Christoph, 1887; Depressariodes marmaricellus Turati, 1924; Exaeretia eremella Amsel, 1972

Species of moth

Exaeretia fuscicostella is a moth in the family Depressariidae. It was described by Hugo Theodor Christoph in 1887. It is found in southern Kazakhstan, Turkmenistan, Uzbekistan, Kyrgyzstan, Libya, Arabia, Iran, Afghanistan and western Pakistan.
