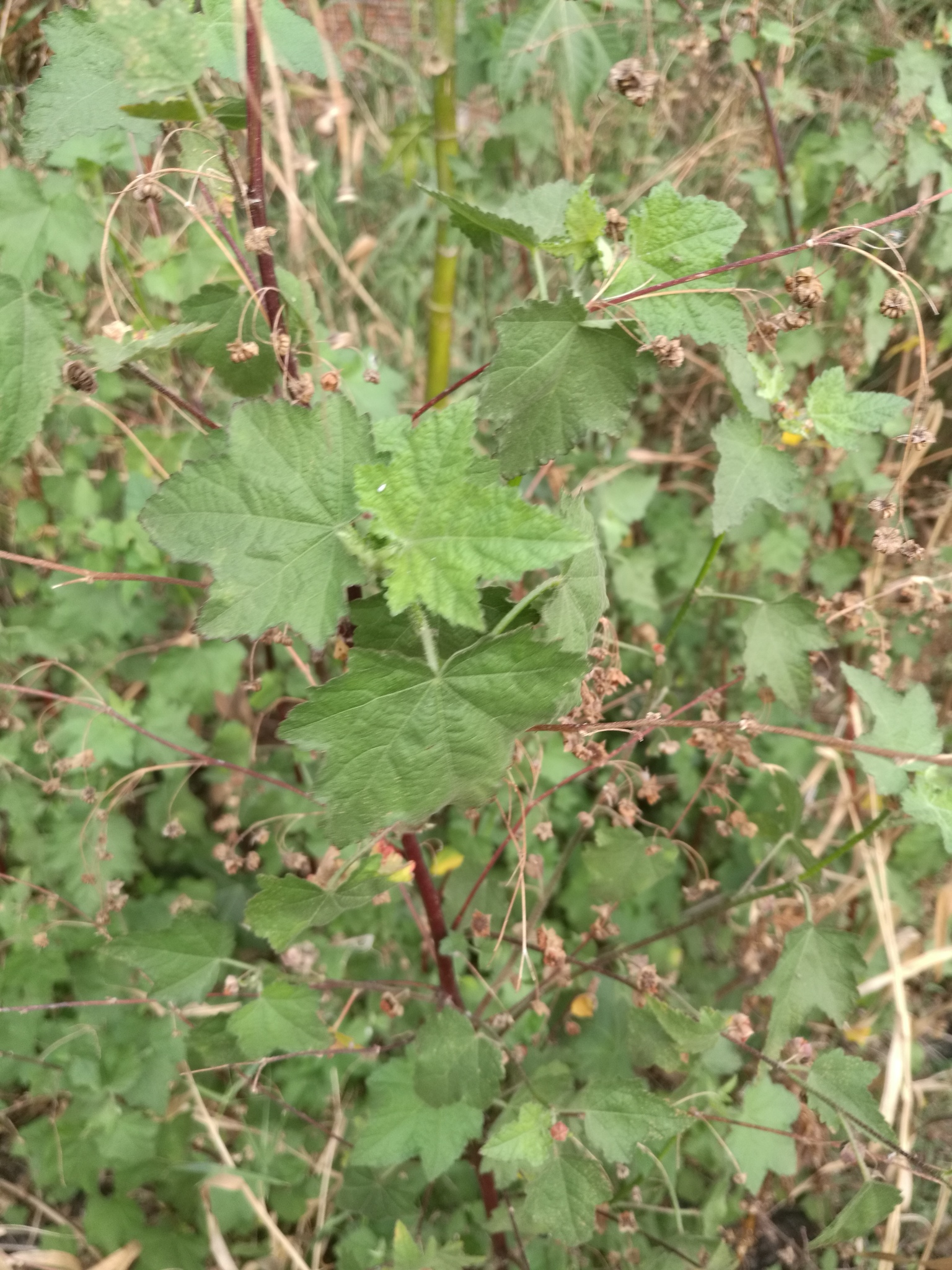
- Kearnemalvastrum lacteum

Scientific classification
- Kingdom: Plantae
- Clade: Tracheophytes
- Clade: Angiosperms
- Clade: Eudicots
- Clade: Rosids
- Order: Malvales
- Family: Malvaceae
- Genus: Kearnemalvastrum; D.M.Bates

= Kearnemalvastrum =

Genus of plants

Kearnemalvastrum is a genus of flowering plants belonging to the family Malvaceae.

Its native range is Mexico to Colombia. It is also found in the countries of Costa Rica, Guatemala and Honduras.

The genus name of Kearnemalvastrum is in honour of Thomas Henry Kearney (1874–1956), an American botanist and agronomist known for his work on cotton and date palm breeding, plant taxonomy, and also the flora of Arizona.

It was first described and published in Brittonia Vol.19 on page 229 in 1967.

Known species, according to Kew:

- Kearnemalvastrum lacteum (Aiton) D.M.Bates
- Kearnemalvastrum subtriflorum (Lag.) D.M.Bates
