= Exaeretia vladimiri =

Scientific classification
- Kingdom: Animalia
- Phylum: Arthropoda
- Clade: Pancrustacea
- Class: Insecta
- Order: Lepidoptera
- Family: Depressariidae
- Genus: Exaeretia
- Species: E. vladimiri

Binomial name
- Exaeretia vladimiri Lvovsky, 1984

Species of moth

Exaeretia vladimiri is a moth in the family Depressariidae. It was described by Alexandr L. Lvovsky in 1984. It is found in Turkmenistan, southern Kazakhstan and southern Uzbekistan.
