= Exaeretia fuscogriseella =

Scientific classification
- Kingdom: Animalia
- Phylum: Arthropoda
- Clade: Pancrustacea
- Class: Insecta
- Order: Lepidoptera
- Family: Depressariidae
- Genus: Exaeretia
- Species: E. fuscogriseella

Binomial name
- Exaeretia fuscogriseella Hannemann, 1990

Species of moth

Exaeretia fuscogriseella is a moth in the family Depressariidae. It was described by Hans-Joachim Hannemann in 1990. It is found in Russia (Altai Mountains, Sayan Mountains).
