= Exaeretia lepidella =

Scientific classification
- Kingdom: Animalia
- Phylum: Arthropoda
- Clade: Pancrustacea
- Class: Insecta
- Order: Lepidoptera
- Family: Depressariidae
- Genus: Exaeretia
- Species: E. lepidella

Binomial name
- Exaeretia lepidella (Christoph, 1872)

Synonyms
- Depressaria lepidella Christoph, 1872

Species of moth

Exaeretia lepidella is a moth of the family Depressariidae. It is found in Russia (the Urals and Siberia).
