= Exaeretia lutosella =

Scientific classification
- Kingdom: Animalia
- Phylum: Arthropoda
- Clade: Pancrustacea
- Class: Insecta
- Order: Lepidoptera
- Family: Depressariidae
- Genus: Exaeretia
- Species: E. lutosella

Binomial name
- Exaeretia lutosella (Herrich-Schäffer, 1854)

Synonyms
- Depressaria lutosella Herrich-Schaffer, 1854

Species of moth

Exaeretia lutosella is a moth of the family Depressariidae. It is found in Ukraine, Romania, North Macedonia, Croatia, Italy, France, Spain, Portugal, Turkey, Palestine, Syria and Morocco.

The wingspan is about 22 mm.
