= Exaeretia niviferella =

Scientific classification
- Kingdom: Animalia
- Phylum: Arthropoda
- Clade: Pancrustacea
- Class: Insecta
- Order: Lepidoptera
- Family: Depressariidae
- Genus: Exaeretia
- Species: E. niviferella

Binomial name
- Exaeretia niviferella (Christoph, 1872)

Synonyms
- Depressaria niviferella Christoph, 1872

Species of moth

Exaeretia niviferella is a moth of the family Depressariidae. It is found in Ukraine, Russia (Uralsk, Daghestan), Azerbaijan, Kazakhstan and north-western China.
