= Exaeretia daurella =

Scientific classification
- Kingdom: Animalia
- Phylum: Arthropoda
- Clade: Pancrustacea
- Class: Insecta
- Order: Lepidoptera
- Family: Depressariidae
- Genus: Exaeretia
- Species: E. daurella

Binomial name
- Exaeretia daurella Lvovsky, 1998

Species of moth

Exaeretia daurella is a moth in the family Depressariidae. It was described by Alexandr L. Lvovsky in 1998. It is found in Transbaikalia.
