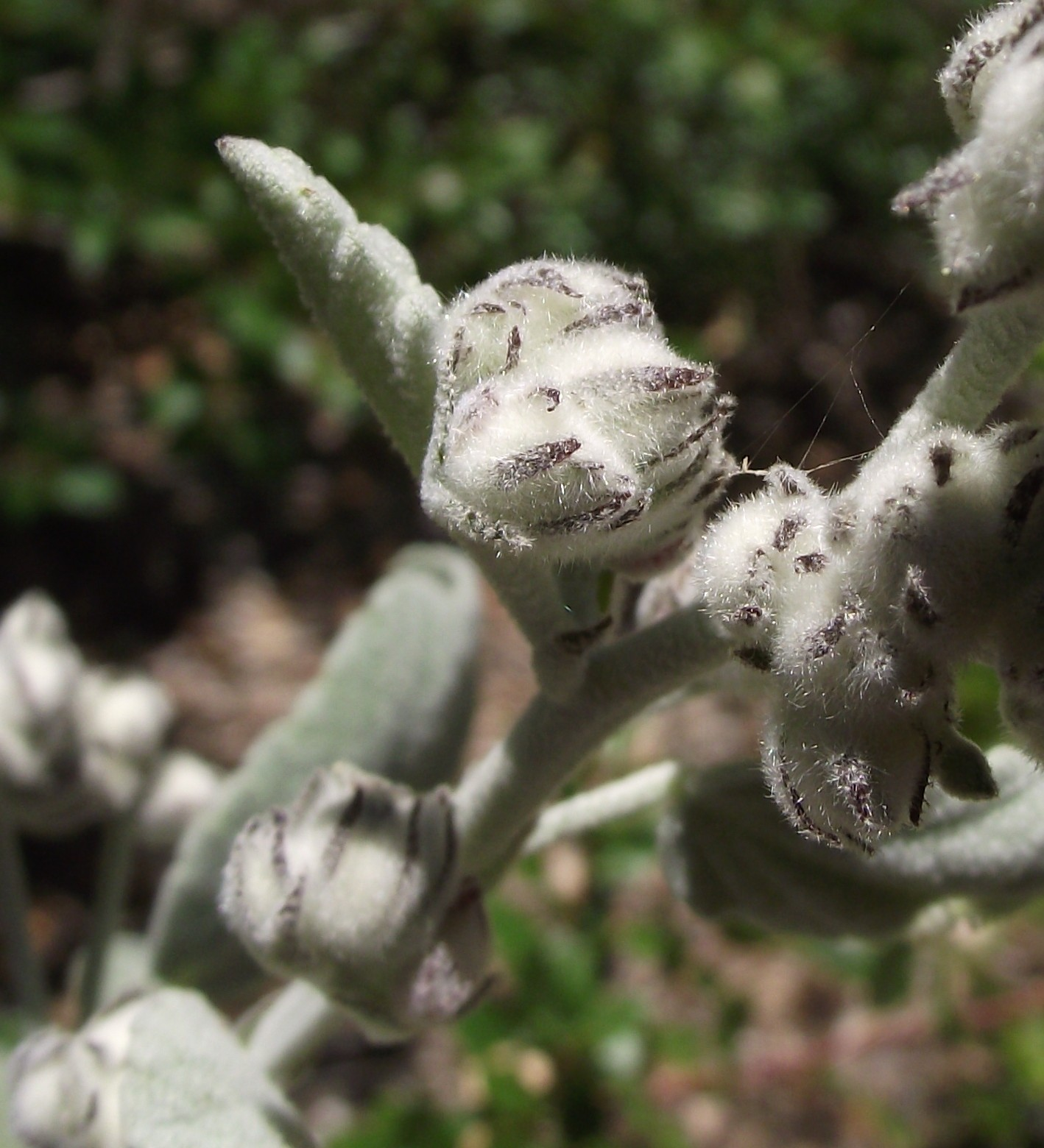
- At the University of California Botanical Garden

Conservation status
- Apparently Secure (NatureServe)

Scientific classification
- Kingdom: Plantae
- Clade: Embryophytes
- Clade: Tracheophytes
- Clade: Spermatophytes
- Clade: Angiosperms
- Clade: Eudicots
- Clade: Rosids
- Order: Malvales
- Family: Malvaceae
- Genus: Malacothamnus
- Species: M. jonesii

Binomial name
- Malacothamnus jonesii (Munz) Kearney

= Malacothamnus jonesii =

Species of flowering plant

Malacothamnus jonesii is a species of flowering plant in the mallow family which has three varieties, two of which are sometimes recognized at the species rank as Malacothamnus gracilis and Malacothamnus niveus. Malacothamnus jonesii is endemic to San Luis Obispo County, California and just over its northern and southern borders in Monterey and Santa Barbara counties.

== Varieties ==
Three varieties are recognized in Malacothamnus jonesii: Malacothamnus jonesii var. jonesii, Malacothamnus jonesii var. gracilis, and Malacothamnus jonesii var. niveus. The three varieties are mostly morphologically and geographically distinct but intergrade where their geographic ranges meet. These varieties together form a single clade in phylogenetic analyses.

Malacothamnus jonesii var. jonesii is known by the common name Jones’s bushmallow. It is distinguished from the other varieties by the combination of shorter calyx hairs and a spike-like inflorescence.

Malacothamnus jonesii var. gracilis is known by the common names Huasna bushmallow and slender bushmallow. It is distinguished from the other varieties by the combination of shorter calyx hairs and a panicle-like inflorescence.

Malacothamnus jonesii var. niveus is known by the common name fragrant-snow bushmallow. It is distinguished from the other varieties by its longer calyx hairs.
