= Malacothamnus arcuatus =

Scientific classification
- Kingdom: Plantae
- Clade: Tracheophytes
- Clade: Angiosperms
- Clade: Eudicots
- Clade: Rosids
- Order: Malvales
- Family: Malvaceae
- Genus: Malacothamnus
- Species: M. arcuatus

Binomial name
- Malacothamnus arcuatus (Greene) Greene

Species of flowering plant

Malacothamnus arcuatus is a species of flowering plant in the mallow family, which has two varieties, one of which is sometimes recognized as the species Malacothamnus hallii.

== Varieties ==
Two varieties are recognized in Malacothamnus arcuatus: Malacothamnus arcuatus var. arcuatus and Malacothamnus arcuatus var. elmeri. The two varieties are mostly morphologically distinct but intergrade where their geographic ranges meet. These varieties together form a single clade in phylogenetic analyses with some analyses providing evidence supporting two taxa. Malacothamnus arcuatus var. arcuatus is distinguished from M. arcuatus var. elmeri by having longer calyx bracts and longer stellate trichome rays on the stem.

Malacothamnus arcuatus var. arcuatus is known by the common names western bewildering bushmallow and arcuate bushmallow. It is endemic to the San Francisco Peninsula.

Malacothamnus arcuatus var. elmeri is known by the common names eastern bewildering bushmallow and Hall's bushmallow. When treated at the species rank, it is given the name M. hallii. It is endemic to the southern Coastal Ranges of California, primarily in the northern half of the Diablo Range and areas in-between it and the Santa Cruz Mountains.
