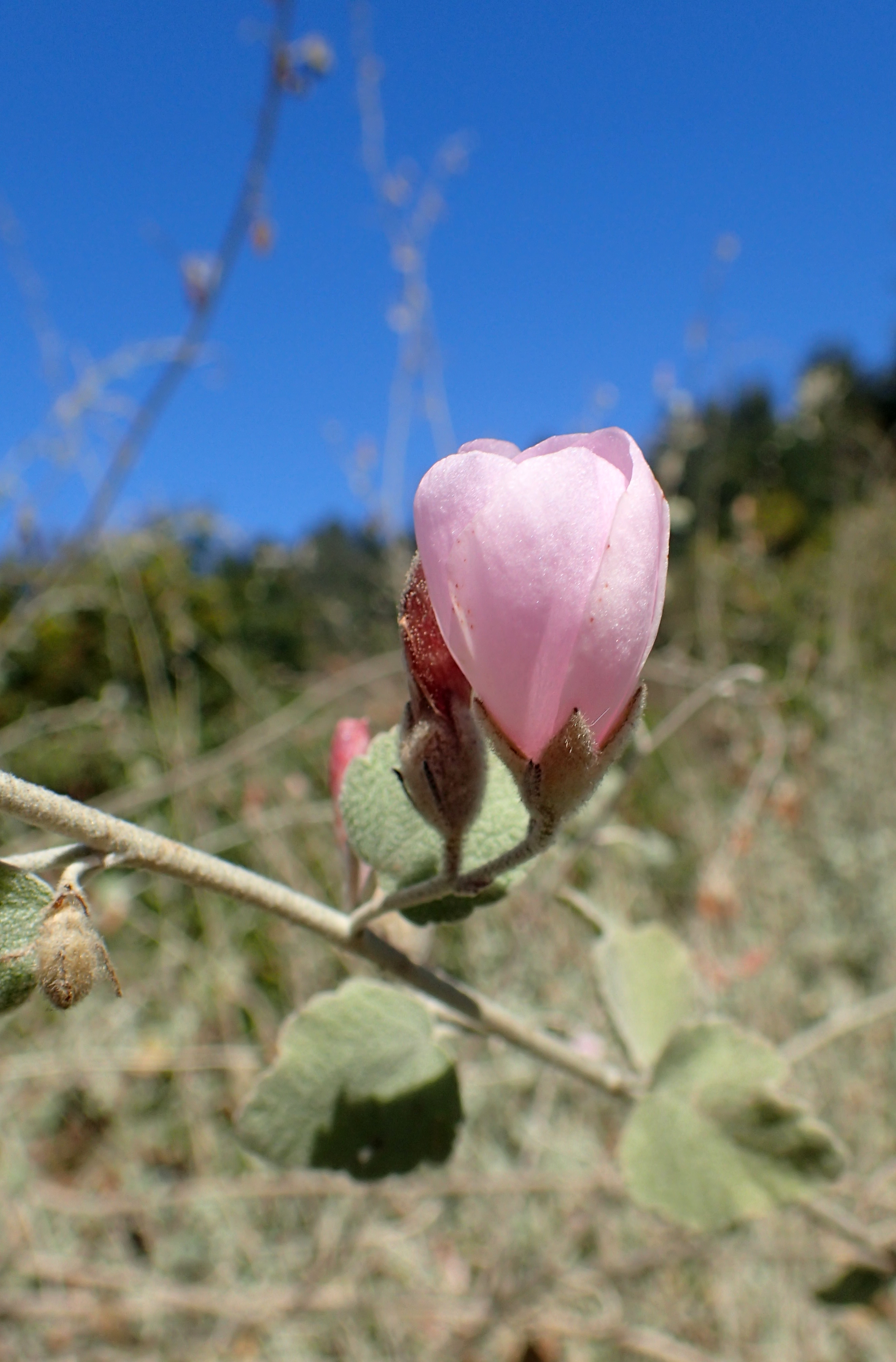
- Malacothamnis fremontii

Conservation status
- Apparently Secure (NatureServe)

Scientific classification
- Kingdom: Plantae
- Clade: Tracheophytes
- Clade: Angiosperms
- Clade: Eudicots
- Clade: Rosids
- Order: Malvales
- Family: Malvaceae
- Genus: Malacothamnus
- Species: M. fremontii

Binomial name
- Malacothamnus fremontii (Torr. ex A.Gray) Torr. ex Greene

= Malacothamnus fremontii =

Species of flowering plant

Malacothamnus fremontii is a species of flowering plant in the mallow family, which has two varieties, one of which is sometimes recognized as the species Malacothamnus helleri. Malacothamnus fremontii is known by the common names unfurled bushmallow (as its corollas remain unfurled after flowering) and Frémont's bushmallow (after John C. Frémont). Unfurled bushmallow is the suggested common name for people who do not wish to honor Fremont, who led multiple massacres against Indigenous peoples. Malacothamnus fremontii is endemic to northern California in and west of the Sierra Nevada.

== Varieties ==
Two varieties are recognized in Malacothamnus fremontii: Malacothamnus fremontii var. fremontii and Malacothamnus fremontii var. exfibulosus. The two varieties are mostly morphologically distinct but possibly intergrade where their geographic ranges meet. Morphological, phylogenetic, and geographic evidence indicates that up to three or four lineages could be recognized as varieties of M. fremontii but more research is needed clarify which should be.

Malacothamnus fremontii var. fremontii is known by the common name long-haired unfurled bushmallow. Malacothamnus fremontii var. exfibulosus is known by the common name short-haired unfurled bushmallow. The length of hairs on the stem of each is the character most useful in distinguishing them.
