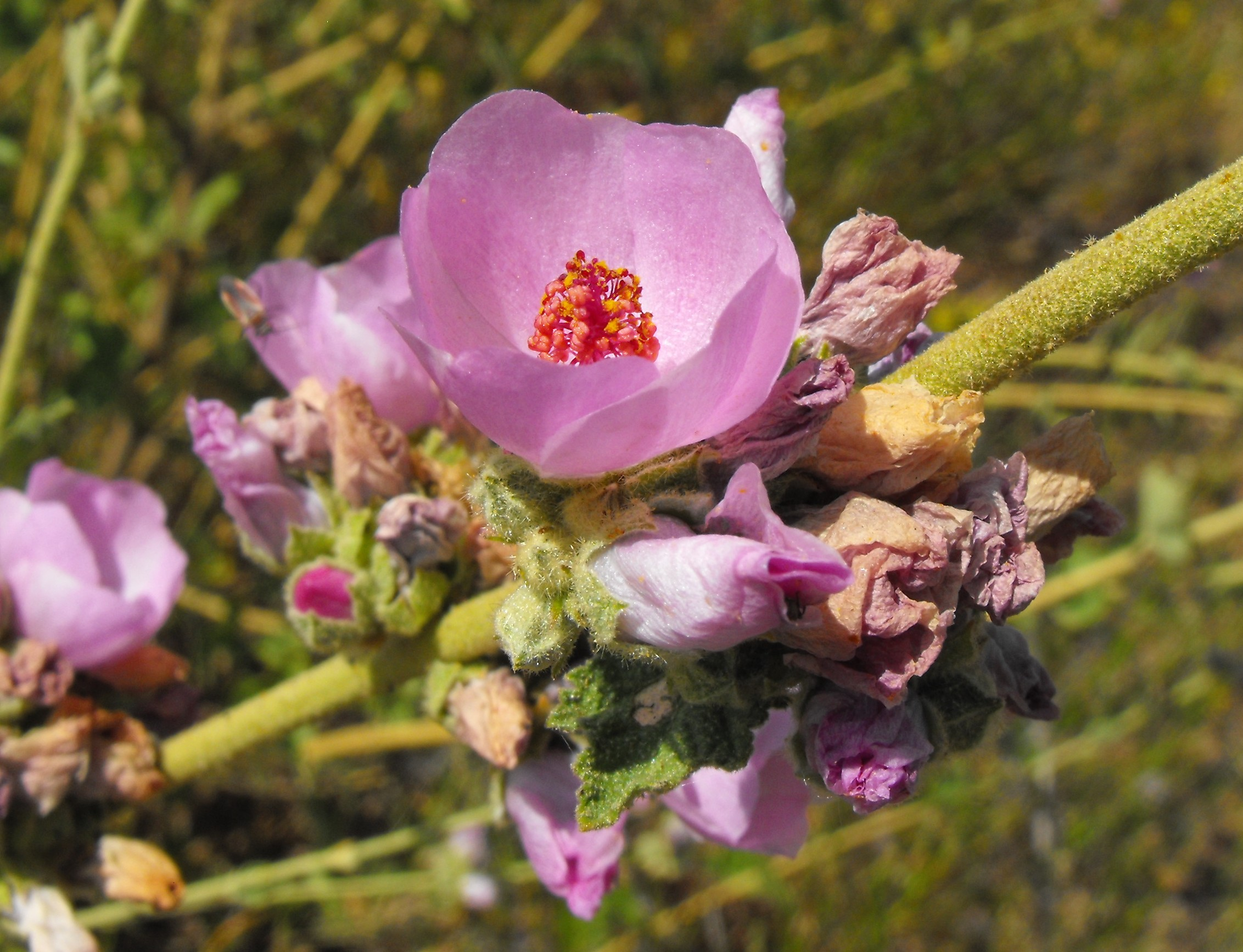
- Malacothamnus fasciculatus var. fasciculatus

Scientific classification
- Kingdom: Plantae
- Clade: Tracheophytes
- Clade: Angiosperms
- Clade: Eudicots
- Clade: Rosids
- Order: Malvales
- Family: Malvaceae
- Genus: Malacothamnus
- Species: M. fasciculatus

Binomial name
- Malacothamnus fasciculatus (Nutt. ex Torr. & A.Gray) Greene

= Malacothamnus fasciculatus =

Species of flowering plant

Malacothamnus fasciculatus is a species of flowering plant in the mallow family, which has four varieties. It is endemic to southwestern California and northwestern Baja California.

== Varieties ==
Four varieties are recognized in Malacothamnus fasciculatus, which can be difficult to distinguish morphologically but are mostly distinct geographically. Malacothamnus fasciculatus var. catalinensis and Malacothamnus fasciculatus var. nesioticus are geographically isolated on islands. Malacothamnus fasciculatus var. fasciculatus and Malacothamnus fasciculatus var. laxiflorus intergrade where their ranges meet.

- Malacothamnus fasciculatus var. catalinensis is known by the common name Santa Catalina Island bushmallow. It is endemic to Santa Catalina Island and has a California Rare Plant Rank of 4.2.
- Malacothamnus fasciculatus var. fasciculatus is known by the common names southern coastal bushmallow, mesa bushmallow, and chaparral bushmallow. It is endemic to San Diego County, California and northwestern Baja California
- Malacothamnus fasciculatus var. laxiflorus is known by the common name splendid bushmallow. It is endemic to mainland southern California.
- Malacothamnus fasciculatus var. nesioticus is known by the common name Santa Cruz Island bushmallow. It is endemic to Santa Cruz Island. It has a California Rare Plant Range of 1B.1 and is listed as endangered both Federally and in California
