= Malacothamnus densiflorus =

Conservation status
- Vulnerable (NatureServe)

Scientific classification
- Kingdom: Plantae
- Clade: Tracheophytes
- Clade: Angiosperms
- Clade: Eudicots
- Clade: Rosids
- Order: Malvales
- Family: Malvaceae
- Genus: Malacothamnus
- Species: M. densiflorus

Binomial name
- Malacothamnus densiflorus (S.Watson) Greene

Varieties
- Malacothamnus densiflorus var. densiflorus Autonym; Malacothamnus densiflorus var. viscidus (Abrams) Kearney

Synonyms
- Malvastrum densiflorum S.Watson; Malvastrum densiflorum var. typicum Estes; Sphaeralcea densiflora (S.Watson) Jeps.

Species of flowering plant

Malacothamnus densiflorus is a species of flowering plant in the mallow family, which has two varieties. It is endemic to the Peninsular Ranges of southwestern California and northwestern Baja California.

== Varieties ==
Two varieties are recognized in Malacothamnus densiflorus: Malacothamnus densiflorus var. densiflorus and Malacothamnus densiflorus var. viscidus. The geographic ranges of these varieties only overlap slightly.

Malacothamnus densiflorus var. densiflorus is known by the common names few-rayed bushmallow, many-flowered bushmallow, and dense-flowered bushmallow. It can be mostly distinguished from the rest of the genus by the nonglandular trichomes on the abaxial calyx surface, which are relatively long, relatively sparse (especially on the calyx tube), and simple to relatively few-rayed. The common name few-rayed bushmallow comes from this distinctive character. It is distinguished from M. densiflorus var. viscidus by having sparser nonglandular trichomes on the abaxial surface of the calyx tube and shorter glandular trichomes overall.

Malacothamnus densiflorus var. viscidus is known by the common name emerald unicorn bushmallow, which is named after the glandular trichomes that, after drying, sometimes resemble unicorn horns made of emerald. It can be distinguished from most of the rest of the genus by the combination of a spike-like inflorescence and relatively long glandular trichomes. Malacothamnus densiflorus var. viscidus is endemic to San Diego County, California and adjacent Baja California on Otay Mountain northward to near the town of Jamul, California.
