= Thomas Henry Kearney =

American botanist and agronomist (1874–1956)

- Born: June 27, 1874; Cincinnati, Ohio
- Died: October 19, 1956 (aged 82); San Francisco, California
- Education: University of Tennessee
- Scientific career
- Fields: Botany, Agriculture
- Workplaces: U.S. Department of Agriculture, California Academy of Sciences

Thomas Henry Kearney (27 June 1874 – 19 October 1956) was an American botanist and agronomist known for his work on cotton and date palm breeding, plant taxonomy, and the flora of Arizona.

Kearney was born on 27 June 1874 in Cincinnati, Ohio. He enrolled in the University of Tennessee in 1889, and began working for the U.S. Department of Agriculture in 1894, where he would work for the next 50 years. Kearney published a revision of North American Calamagrostis in 1898, describing 23 new species or varieties. From 1898 to 1900 Kearney participated in the Harriman Alaska Expedition. In the early 1900s Kearney traveled throughout North Africa to study crops such as dates and cotton in arid and alkali soils, and began a decades-long period of cotton-breeding research in Arizona. Kearney served as president of the Botanical Society of Washington in 1917. From 1920 to 1944 he also studied the taxonomy and distributions of plants of Arizona. A major collaborator during this period was Robert Hibbs Peebles, Kearney's junior colleague at the department, with whom Kearney published many papers on cotton genetics and plant taxonomy. The contributions of Kearney and Peebles to the science of cotton growing have been recognized as "among the most outstanding of all time." The rare, endangered Arizona plant Amsonia kearneyana (commonly known as Kearney's bluestar), was named after Kearney in 1928. The genus Kearnemalvastrum (Malvaceae), containing two species in Latin America, was posthumously named in honor of Kearney.

Kearney retired from the Department of Agriculture in 1944, after which he moved to San Francisco, California, and became a research associate at the California Academy of Sciences, where he continued his taxonomic studies and collaborations with Peebles. He and Peebles published the first edition of Arizona Flora in 1951, a comprehensive guide to plants of the state that remains a standard reference a half-century later. Kearney was named an honorary curator, and was the subject of biographies and tribute articles by his colleagues. Kearney received the Certificate of Merit by the Botanical Society of America in August, 1956. Kearney died in San Francisco on October 19, 1956, at the age of 82.

In 1967, botanist David Martin Bates, published a genus of flowering plants (belonging to the family Malvaceae), from Central America as Kearnemalvastrum, in Kearney's honour.

== Selected works ==
- Kearney, Thomas H. (1898). A revision of the North American species of Calamagrostis. In: Studies on American Grasses. Bulletin 11, U.S. Dept. of Agriculture.
- Kearney, Thomas H. (1935). The North American species of Sphaeralcea subgenus Eusphaeralcea. Berkeley, Calif: University of California Press.
- Kearney, Thomas H., and Robert H. Peebles. (1942). Flowering plants and ferns of Arizona. Washington, D.C.: U.S. Dept. of Agriculture.
- Kearney, T. H, and R. H. Peebles. 1960. Arizona Flora: with supplement by John Thomas Howell, Elizabeth McLintock and collaborators. Berkeley: Univ. of California Press.
