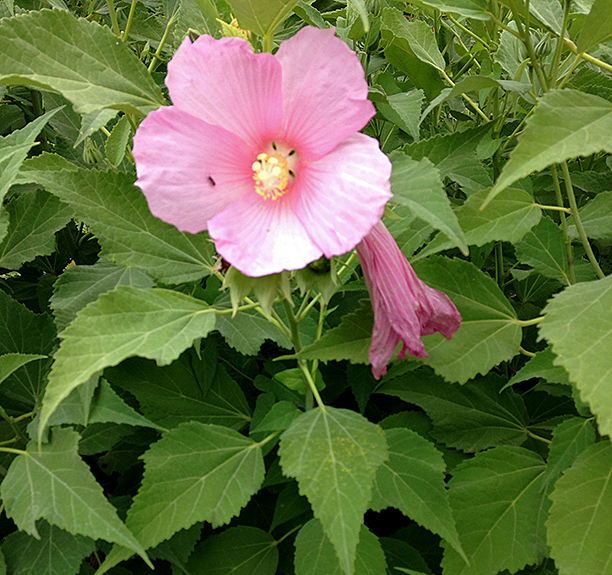
- Muenchhusia moscheutos

Scientific classification
- Kingdom: Plantae
- Clade: Tracheophytes
- Clade: Angiosperms
- Clade: Eudicots
- Clade: Rosids
- Order: Malvales
- Family: Malvaceae
- Subfamily: Malvoideae
- Tribe: Hibisceae
- Genus: Muenchhusia; Heist. ex Fabr.

species
- 5; see text

Synonyms
- Hibiscus sect. Muenchhusia (Heister ex Fabr.) O.J.Blanch.

= Muenchhusia =

Genus of flowering plants

Muenchhusia is a genus of flowering plants in the family Malvaceae. It includes five cold-hardy species native to North America, ranging from southeastern Canada through the central and eastern United States to Cuba and northeastern Mexico.

The genus was first described by Philipp Conrad Fabricius in 1763. It was later subsumed into genus Hibiscus. In 2025 Margaret M. Hanes and Russell L. Barrett reinstated the genus after Hibiscus was found to be polyphyletic.

== Species ==
Five species are accepted.

- Muenchhusia coccinea (Walter) M.M.Hanes & R.L.Barrett
- Muenchhusia dasycalyx (S.F.Blake & Shiller) M.M.Hanes & R.L.Barrett
- Muenchhusia grandiflora (Michx.) M.M.Hanes & R.L.Barrett
- Muenchhusia laevis (All.) M.M.Hanes & R.L.Barrett
- Muenchhusia moscheutos (L.) M.M.Hanes & R.L.Barrett
