= Rose mallow =

Rose mallow may refer to:

- Abelmoschus moschatus, native to Asia and Australia
- Any plant in the genus Lavatera, especially Lavatera trimestris
- Any of several species in the genus Hibiscus, especially:
  - Hibiscus grandiflorus
  - Hibiscus lasiocarpos
  - Hibiscus moscheutos
  - Hibiscus syriacus

== See also ==
- Mallow (disambiguation)
