= Hibiscus 'Kopper King' =

Flowering plant cultivar

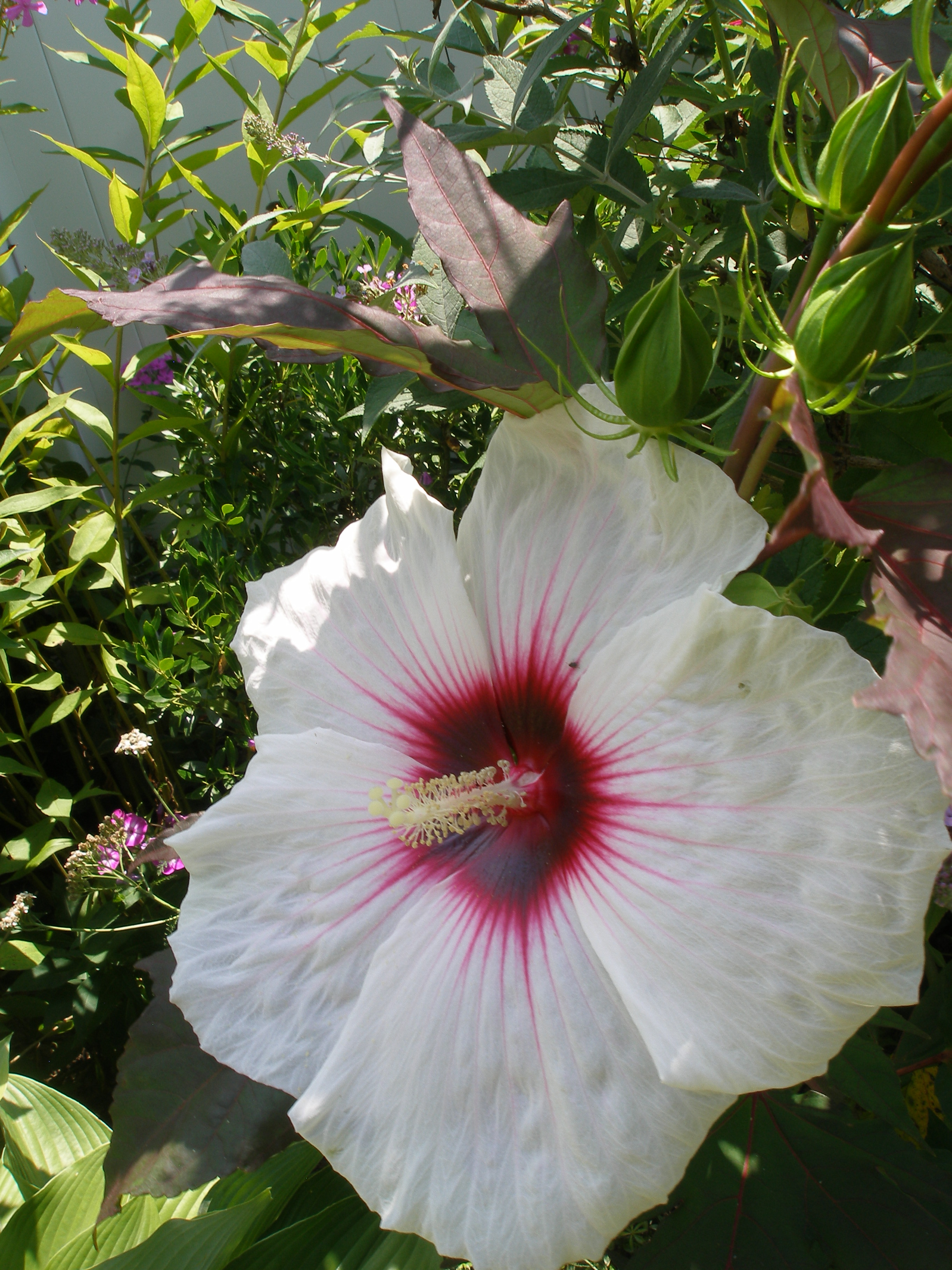
- Genus: Hibiscus
- Species: H. coccineus, H. laevis, H. moscheutos
- Hybrid parentage: 'Dahliatown Orchid' × 'Jazzmen'
- Cultivar: 'Kopper King'
- Origin: Fleming's Flower Fields; Lincoln, Nebraska, USA; 1987

Hibiscus 'Kopper King' is a cultivar of Hibiscus that has large, showy flowers and copper-colored lobed leaves. It was bred and selected for its aesthetic attributes as well as its cold hardiness to at least −30 °F (−34 °C) (USDA hardiness zone 4) by Jim, Bob, and Dave Fleming of Fleming's Flower Fields in Lincoln, Nebraska. 'Kopper King' is a compact perennial shrub, reaching 3–4 ft (0.9–1.2 m) tall with a 2–4 ft (0.6–1.2 m) spread. The leaves are coppery red to dark purple, with a lobed and toothed leaf shape that appears to be similar to some maples. New growth will emerge in late May or early June and the plant will bloom from midsummer to early fall at the first frost. Each flower, with its cream to light-pink petals and deep red eye in the center streaking outward toward the margin, is borne singly from the leaf axils and can be 8–12 in (20.3–30.5 cm) in diameter. Each flower only lasts one day but new blooms are typically produced in succession, allowing for almost continuous flowering. The flower display is flat with petals overlapping. Overall, the plant is resistant to pests and diseases, although it can be severely damaged by Japanese beetles.

'Kopper King' is a complex hybrid involving three species of Hibiscus and is the culmination of a forty-year breeding program established by the Fleming brothers at their nursery in Nebraska. This cultivar was produced by backcrossing two Hibiscus cultivars for three generations: the pollen parent was an inbred seedling of 'Dahliatown Orchid', a cultivar of H. moscheutos, and the seed parent was 'Jazzmen', itself a hybrid of H. moscheutos, H. laevis (formerly H. militaris), and H. coccineus. 'Kopper King' first bloomed in 1987 on the Fleming brothers' property in Nebraska. After testing to verify the characteristics of the plant were stable, they applied for a patent on this cultivar on November 3, 1997. United States plant patent number PP10,793 was granted on February 16, 1999. The patent in part claims that, "[t]his hardy hibiscus plant contributes to the market with its sheer beauty, its compact growth habit, it[s] great resistance to disease and insects, its stability through extremes in rain and drought, and its extreme hardiness."
