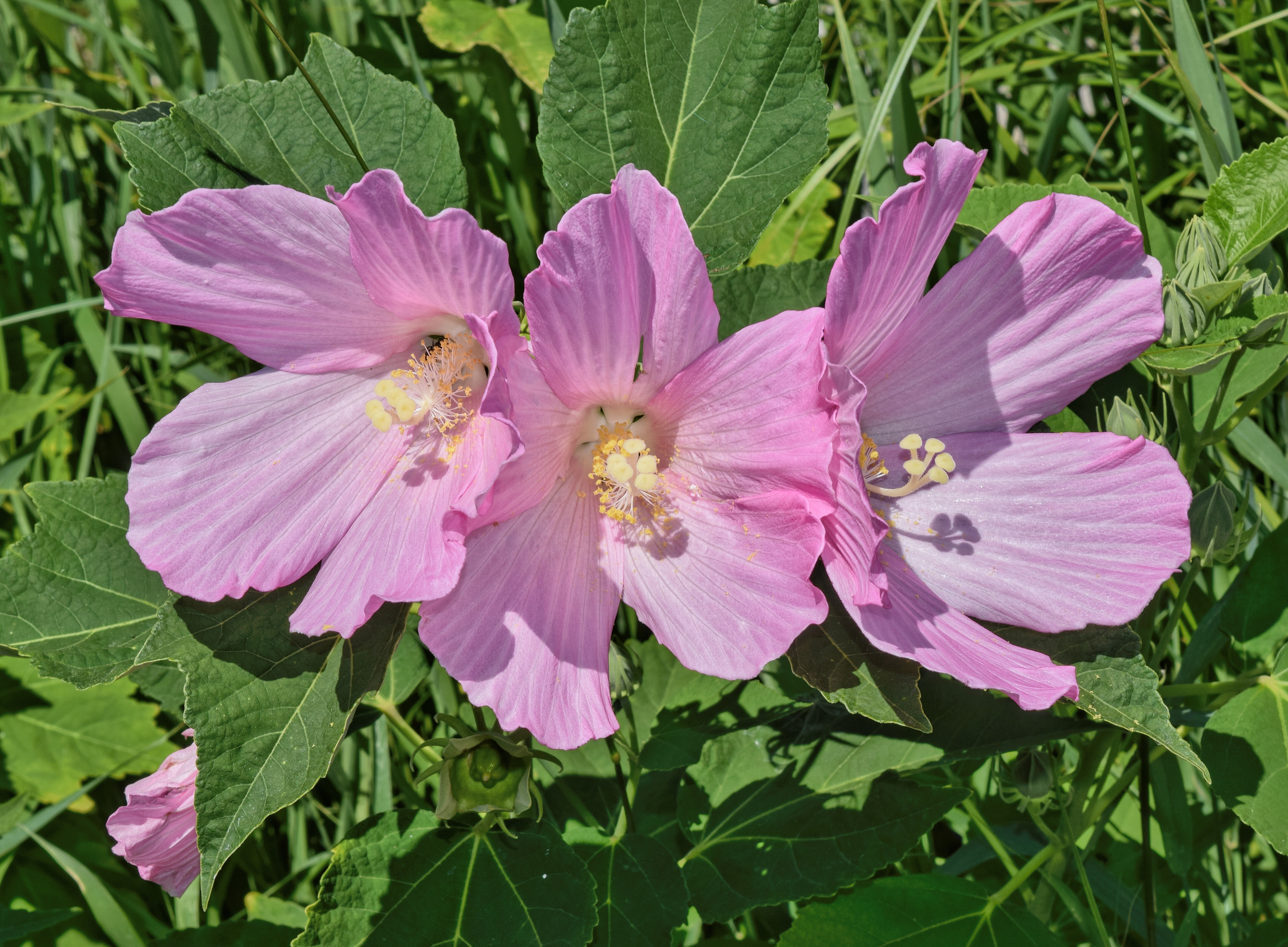

Conservation status
- Least Concern (IUCN 3.1)

- Secure (NatureServe)

Scientific classification
- Kingdom: Plantae
- Clade: Tracheophytes
- Clade: Angiosperms
- Clade: Eudicots
- Clade: Rosids
- Order: Malvales
- Family: Malvaceae
- Genus: Muenchhusia
- Species: M. moscheutos

Binomial name
- Muenchhusia moscheutos (L.) M.M.Hanes & R.L.Barrett

Subspecies
- See here

Synonyms
- Synonyms of subsp. moscheutos: Abelmoschus aquaticus (DC.) Walp.; Abelmoschus palustris (L.) Walp.; Abelmoschus roseus (Thore ex Loisel.) Walp.; Althaea grandiflora Scop.; Hibiscus aquaticus DC.; Hibiscus incanus J.C.Wendl.; Hibiscus laevigatus Targ.Tozz. ex Colla; Hibiscus moscheutos var. flavescens Alph.Wood; Hibiscus moscheutos subsp. incanus (J.C.Wendl.) H.E.Ahles; Hibiscus moscheutos subsp. palustris (L.) R.T.Clausen; Hibiscus moscheutos f. peckii House; Hibiscus moscheutos var. purpureus Sweet; Hibiscus moscheutos subsp. roseus (Thore ex Loisel.) P.Fourn.; Hibiscus oculiroseus Britton ex L.H.Bailey; Hibiscus opulifolius Greene; Hibiscus palustris L.; Hibiscus palustris f. oculiroseus (Britton ex L.H.Bailey) Fernald; Hibiscus palustris f. peckii (House) House; Hibiscus palustris f. peckii (House) House; Hibiscus palustris proles roseus (Thore ex Loisel.) Rouy & E.G.Camus; Hibiscus petioliflorus Stokes; Hibiscus pinetorum Greene; Hibiscus ponticus Rupr.; Hibiscus roseus Thore ex Loisel.; Hibiscus roseus var. albiflorus Parl.

= Muenchhusia moscheutos =

Species of aquatic plant

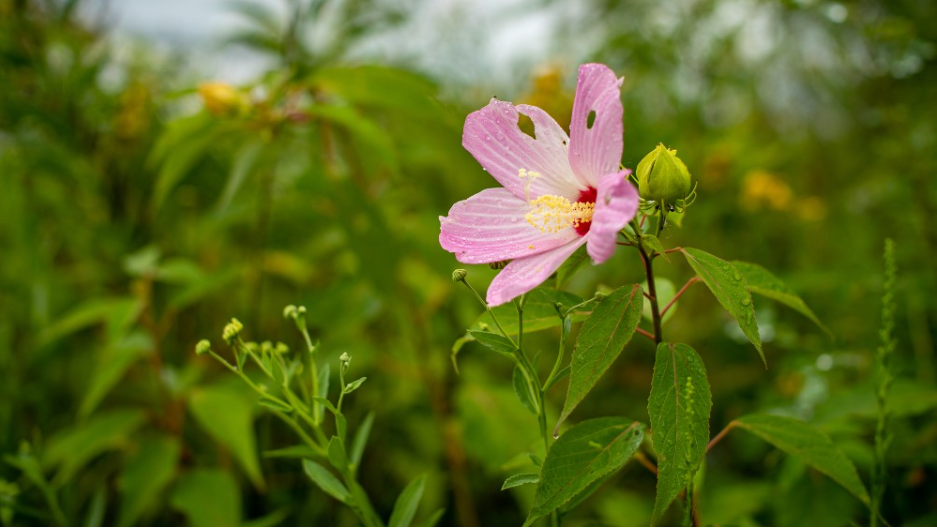
Muenchhusia moscheutos in the Mallows Bay–Potomac River National Marine Sanctuary.

Muenchhusia moscheutos, the rose mallow, swamp rose-mallow, crimsoneyed rosemallow, or eastern rosemallow, is a species of flowering plant in the family Malvaceae. It is a cold-hardy perennial wetland plant that can grow in large colonies. The hirsute leaves are of variable morphology, but are commonly deltoidal in shape with up to three lobes. It is found in wetlands and along the riverine systems of the eastern United States from Texas to the Atlantic states, its territory extending northward to southern Ontario. Subspecies lasiocarpos is also native to northeastern Mexico, California, and Utah.

== Description ==
Numerous forms exist in nature. It is a tall plant, with a height of 1.5–2.5 metres (4.9–8.2 ft) and flowers up to 20 centimetres (7.9 in) across. Petal colors range from pure white through various pinks to deep red, and most have an eye of deep maroon. Taxonomic consensus is lacking for the nomenclature of the multiple subspecies. The flowers are borne apically, whereas the related Hibiscus laevis carries bud and bloom along the stem.

Tall herbaceous shrub-like, perennial forb. Produces multiple stems from a large woody rootstock which are about 3-8 ft tall (1.23m) each year. Thrives in full sun where it blooms at full capacity and becomes resistant to disease. Blooming period lasts up to 1 month but individual flowers are short lived. Typically blooms in Summer and early Fall and produces fruits in late Summer, Fall and Winter.

Flowers are perfect and hollyhock-like and in shades of pink, white, red or burgundy and measure up to 8 inches in diameter. 5 spreading petals with red or burgundy central eye and a staminal column that is light yellow to cream color. Leaves are ovate to lanceolate, alternate, greenish gray to green on adaxial surface, abaxial side white and hairy. Flowers mature into oval, short-beaked, 1-1.25 inch seed capsules that contain a ring of seeds inside.

== Taxonomy ==
It was first described as Hibiscus moscheutos L. by Carl Linnaeus in 1753. It was moved to the genus Muenchhusia Heist. ex Fabr. as Muenchhusia moscheutos (L.) M.M.Hanes & R.L.Barrett by Margaret M. Hanes and Russell Lindsay Barrett in 2025.

=== Subspecies ===
Two subspecies are accepted:

- Muenchhusia moscheutos subsp. lasiocarpos (Cav.) M.M.Hanes & R.L.Barrett
- Muenchhusia moscheutos subsp. moscheutos

== Ecology ==
It is a larval host for the common checkered skipper, the gray hairstreak, the Io moth, and the pearly wood nymph. The plant prefers partial to full sun and is a wetland native, utilizing the constantly moist soils that contain loam, silt and have acidic pH. Pollinated by bees and self-compatible. The most effective pollinators for this species are bumblebees and solitary anthophorid bees (Ptilithrix bombiformis). Multiple studies conducted in Maryland show that a majority of rosemallow flowers are pollinated by Ptilithrix bombiformis. Native to wetlands and creek edges in southeastern United States, found abundantly in all of North Carolina.

== Uses ==
The edible parts of the plant include its leaf buds and young leaves, flowers, immature seed pods (which can be prepared as okra), seeds, and roots.

The leaves and roots are known to contain mucilage. Tea from boiled leaves has been used to relieve cough, sore throat, and digestive inflammation. These medicinal attributes of the tea have been used to treat dysentery, lung ailments, and urinary infections. An infusion of dried stalks has been used to treat bladder infections. Hibiscus moscheutos flowers have also been used externally to reduce swelling and pain from bruises and insect stings.

== Cultivation ==
This is a popular garden plant. It can be propagated by seed, or by crown divisions during winter dormancy, and some success can be achieved by hard-wood stem cuttings. Numerous hybrids of the native North American Hibiscus species have been released by the commercial nursery trade. In cultivation the species or the hybrids can be used in bog gardens or other water features. They are attractive and have wildlife value for nectar-feeders and birds.

=== Cultivars ===
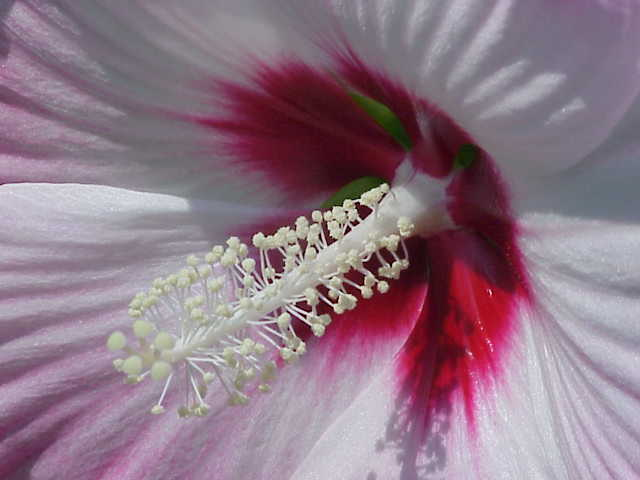
Corolla

Many cold-hardy hibiscus cultivars are hybrids of H. moscheutos, H. coccineus, H. laevis, H. militaris, H. grandiflorus, H. dasycalyx, H. mutabilis. With indeterminate genetic contributions from each parent species. Hibiscus breeders do not preclude the possibility of self-pollination. However, recent research has shown that artificial pollination just after the flower has opened using a high pollen load will ensure that most of the resulting seeds are from the selected pollen parent. Early hibiscus breeders were likely aware of this and used it to their advantage.

== Conservation ==
In Canada this plant is listed as a Schedule 1 species of special concern under the Species at Risk Act (SARA). This species was previously categorized as a species of special concern in April 1987, in November 2004 its status was re-evaluated and confirmed by the Committee on Status of Endangered Wildlife in Canada (COSEWIC). Globally and nationally in the United states, this species is ranked as a common wide spread plant, in New Hampshire it is classified as vulnerable to secure, due to lack of range and decline in populations. The only area in Canada where this species is found is Ontario where it is classified as Vulnerable and is listed as a species of special concern.

== Gallery ==
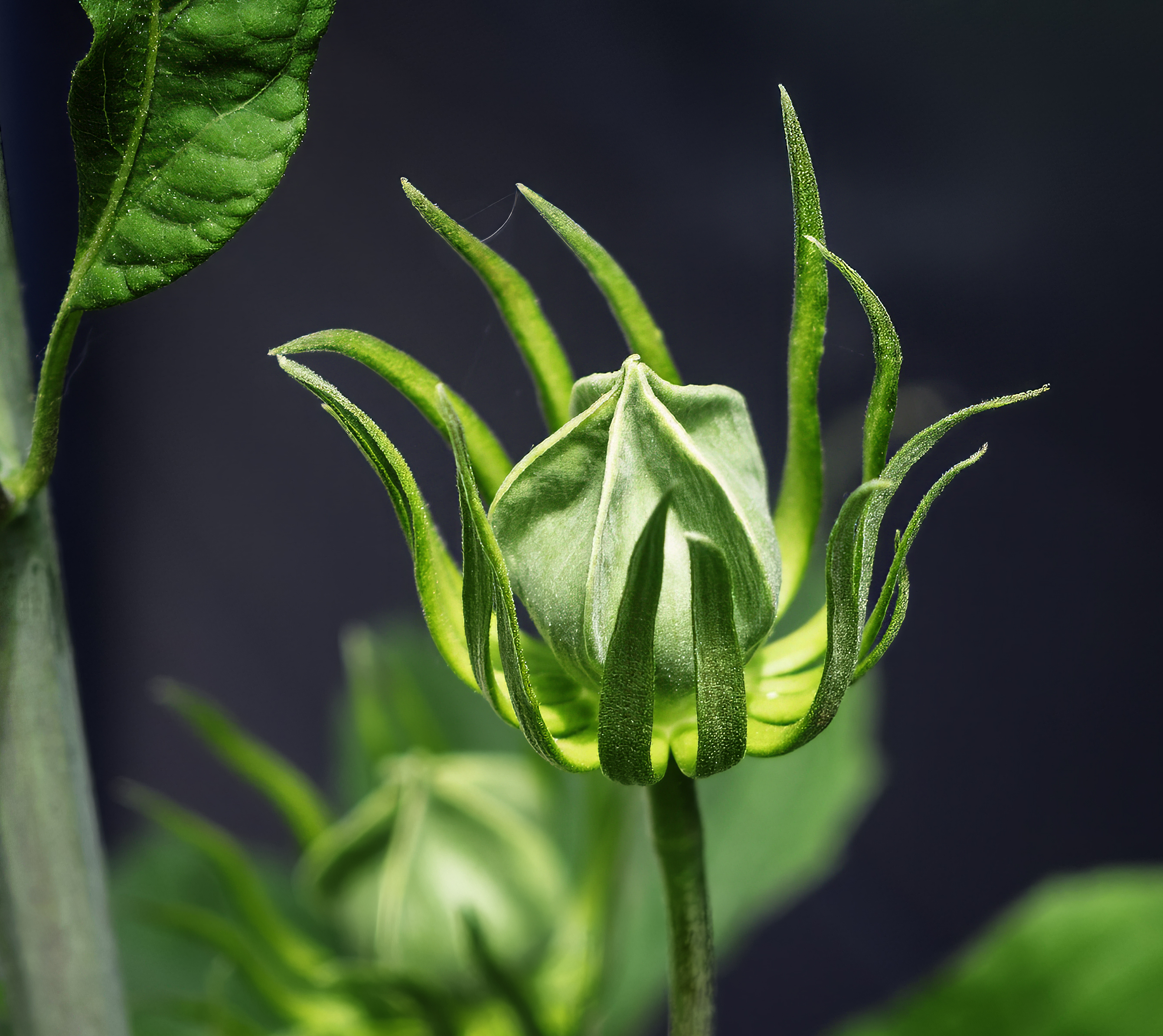
Immature Flower bud

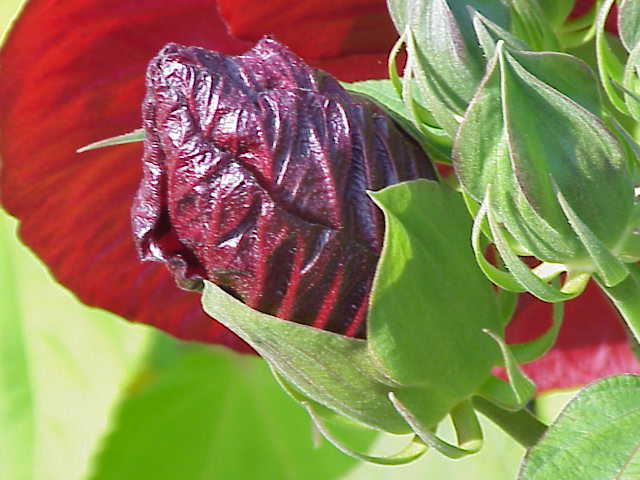
Flower bud

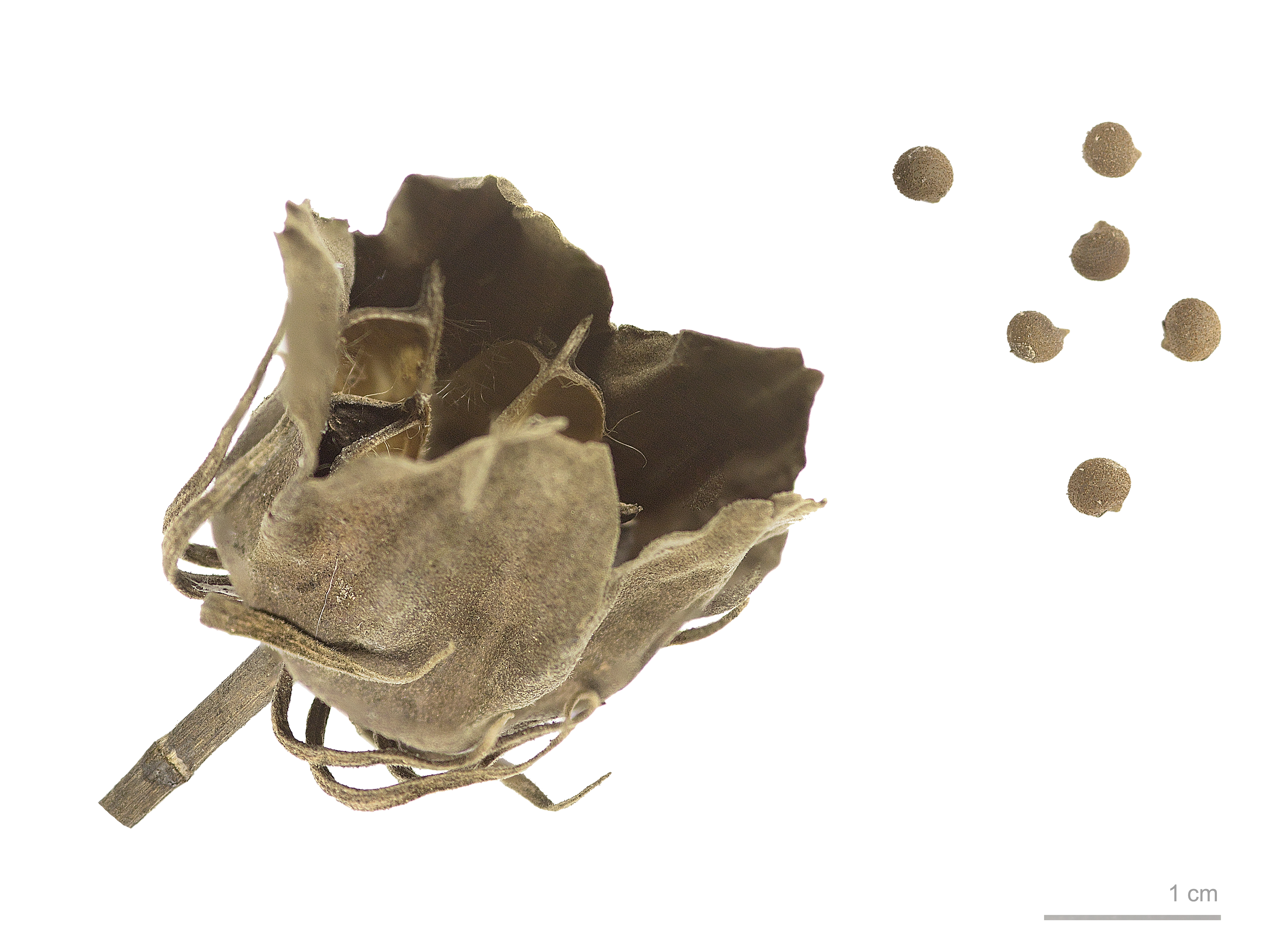
Fruit and seeds - MHNT

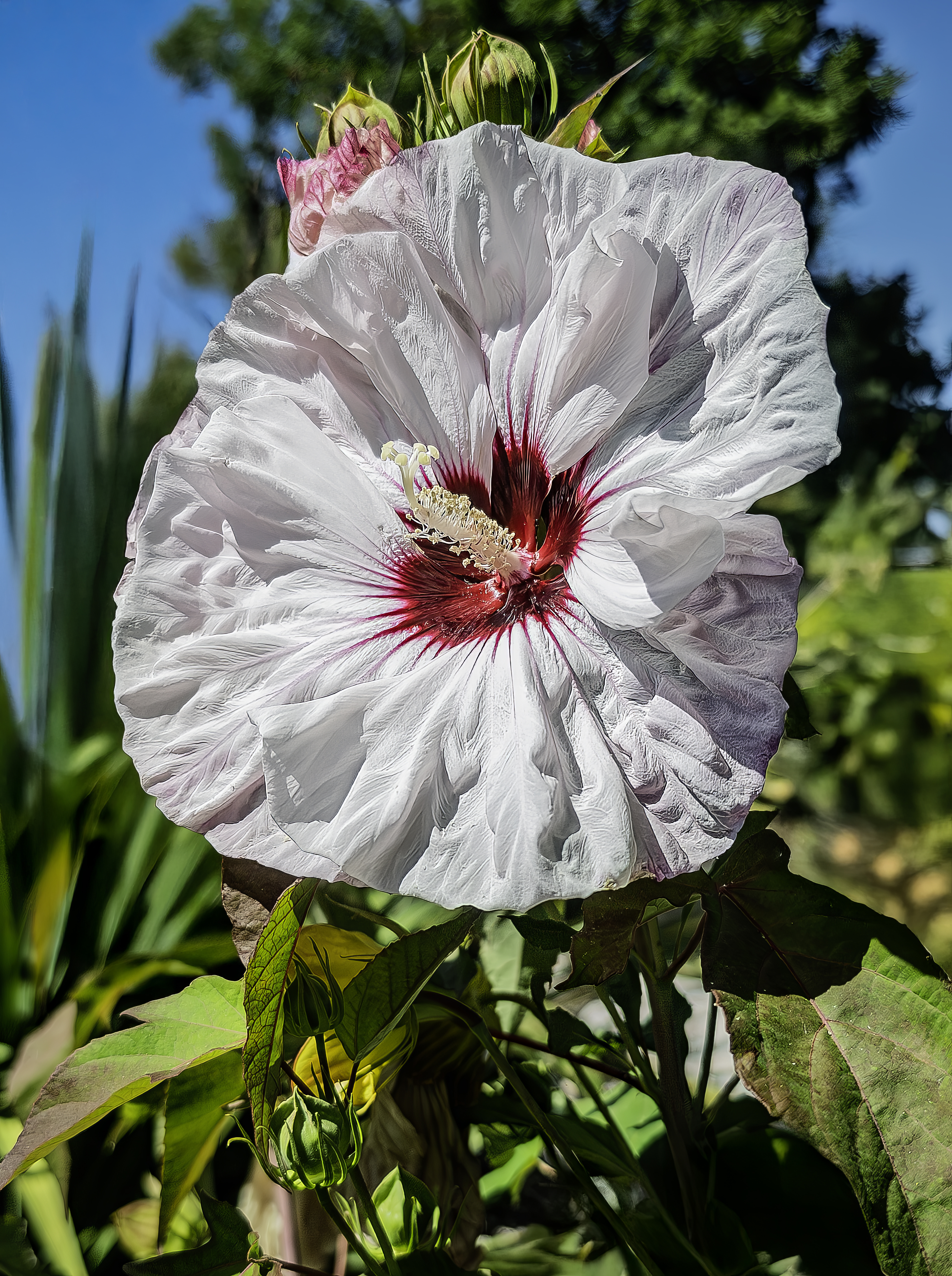
White flower

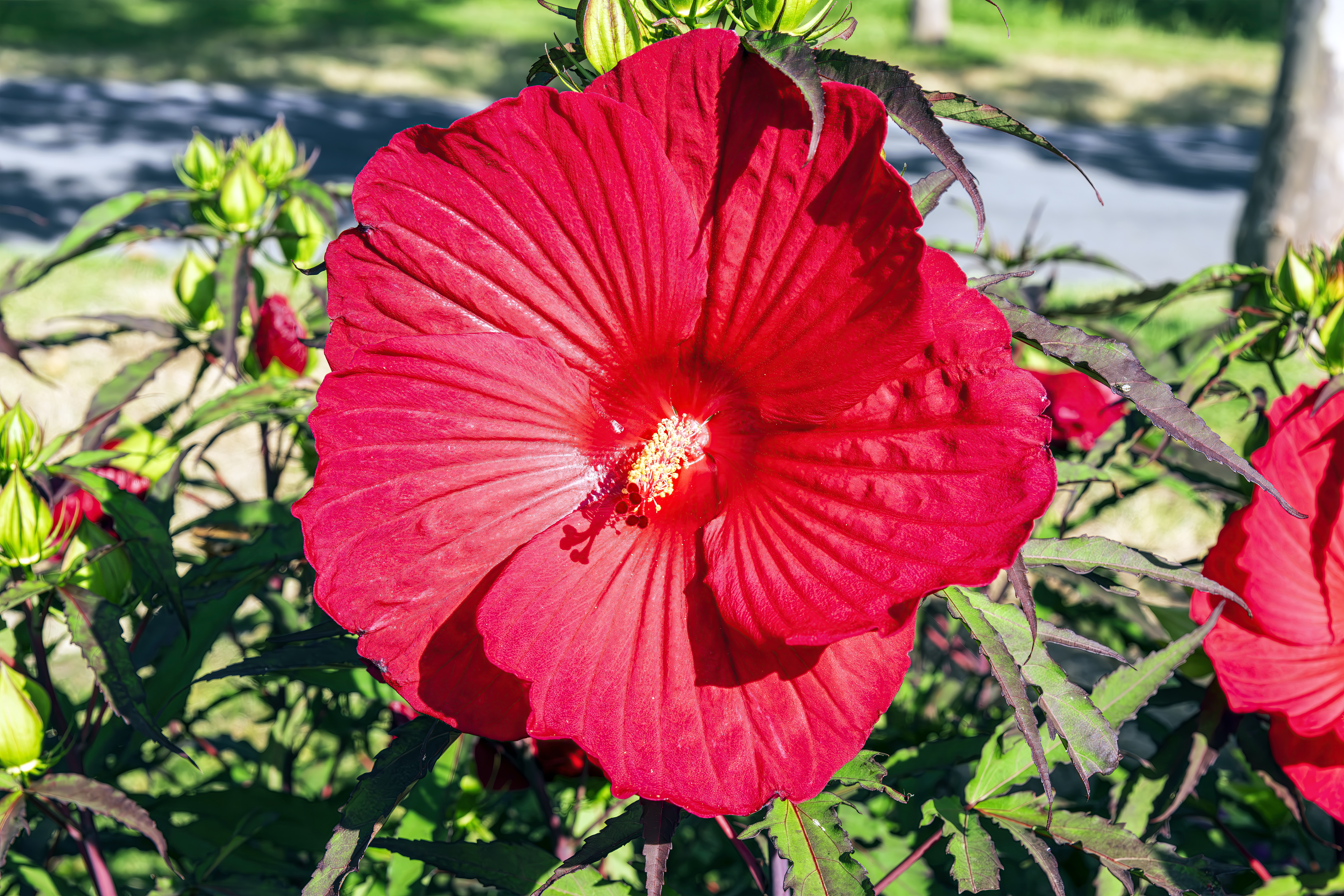
Red flower

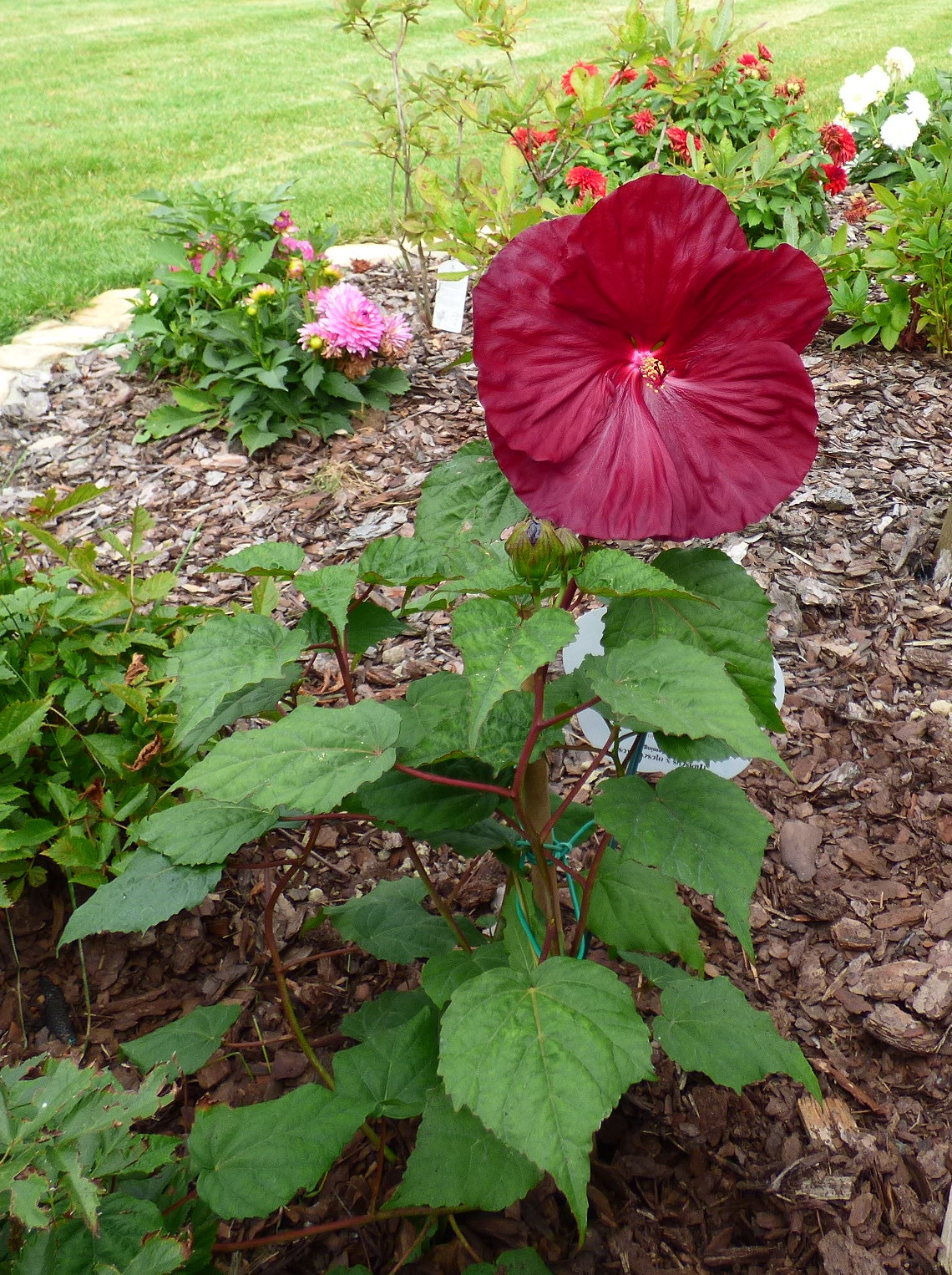
Maroon flower
