= List of Hibiscus cultivars =

This is a partial list of cultivars in the genus Hibiscus.

- Hibiscus 'Acadian Spring'
- Hibiscus 'Acapulco Gold'
- Hibiscus 'Accolade'
- Hibiscus 'Adrenalin'
- Hibiscus 'African Princess'
- Hibiscus 'Agnes Hopkins'

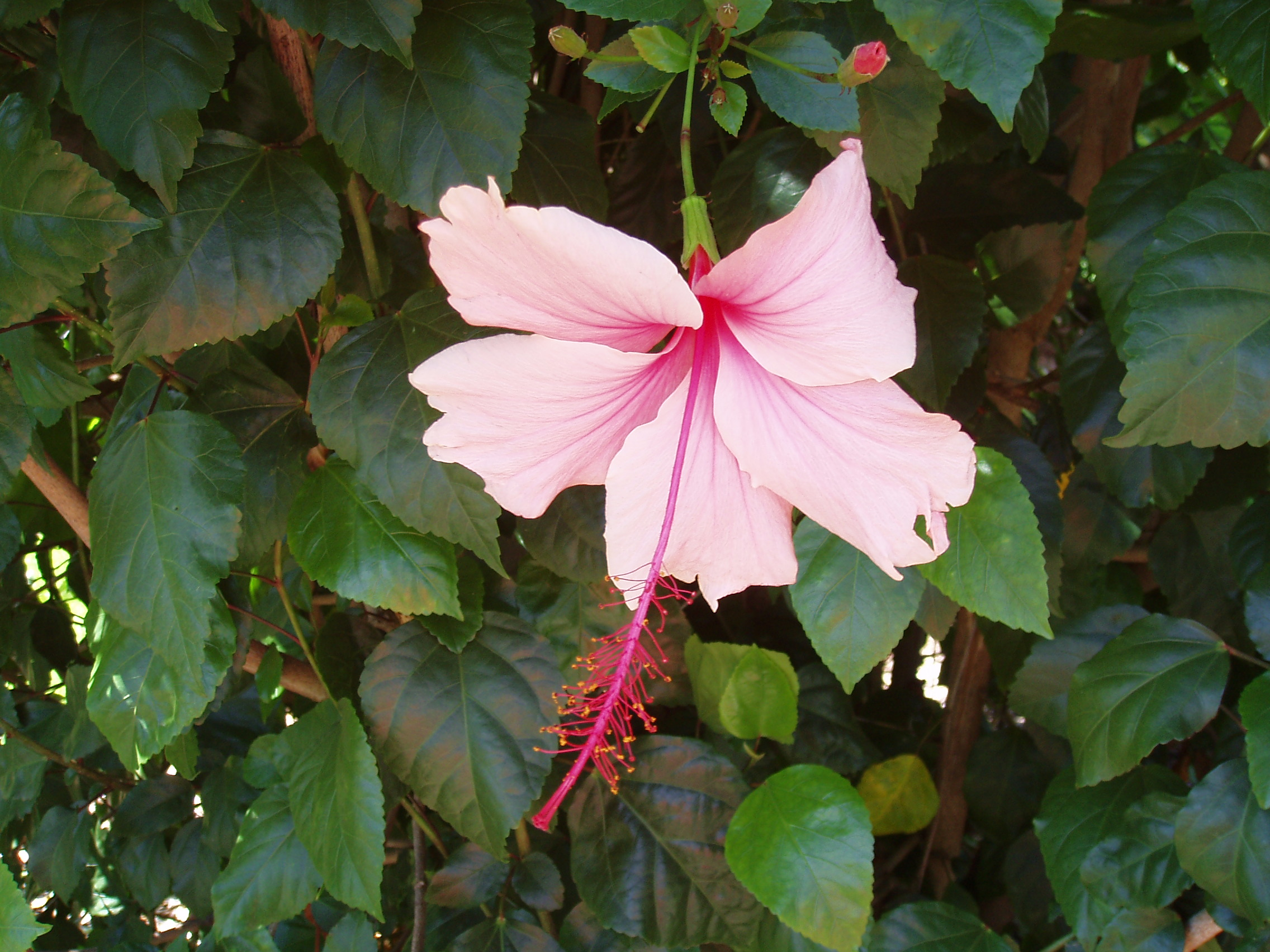
Hibiscus 'Albo Lacinatus'

- Hibiscus 'Albo Lacinatus'
- Hibiscus 'Alexandra Maree'
- Hibiscus 'Alii Uii'
- Hibiscus 'Allan McMullen'
- Hibiscus 'Alluvial Gold'
- Hibiscus 'All Aglow'
- Hibiscus 'Aloha'
- Hibiscus 'Aloha-Elegans'
- Hibiscus 'Alyrah Carol'
- Hibiscus 'Amanda Dubin'
- Hibiscus 'Amanda Nicole'
- Hibiscus 'Amasport'
- Hibiscus 'Amayzing'
- Hibiscus 'Amber Doll'
- Hibiscus 'Amber Magna'
- Hibiscus 'Amber Splashes'
- Hibiscus 'Amber Suzanne'
- Hibiscus 'American Maid'
- Hibiscus 'Amethyst Crystal'
- Hibiscus 'Amethyst Heart'
- Hibiscus 'Amy Lynn'
- Hibiscus 'Anasazi Maiden'
- Hibiscus 'Anastasia'
- Hibiscus 'Andante'

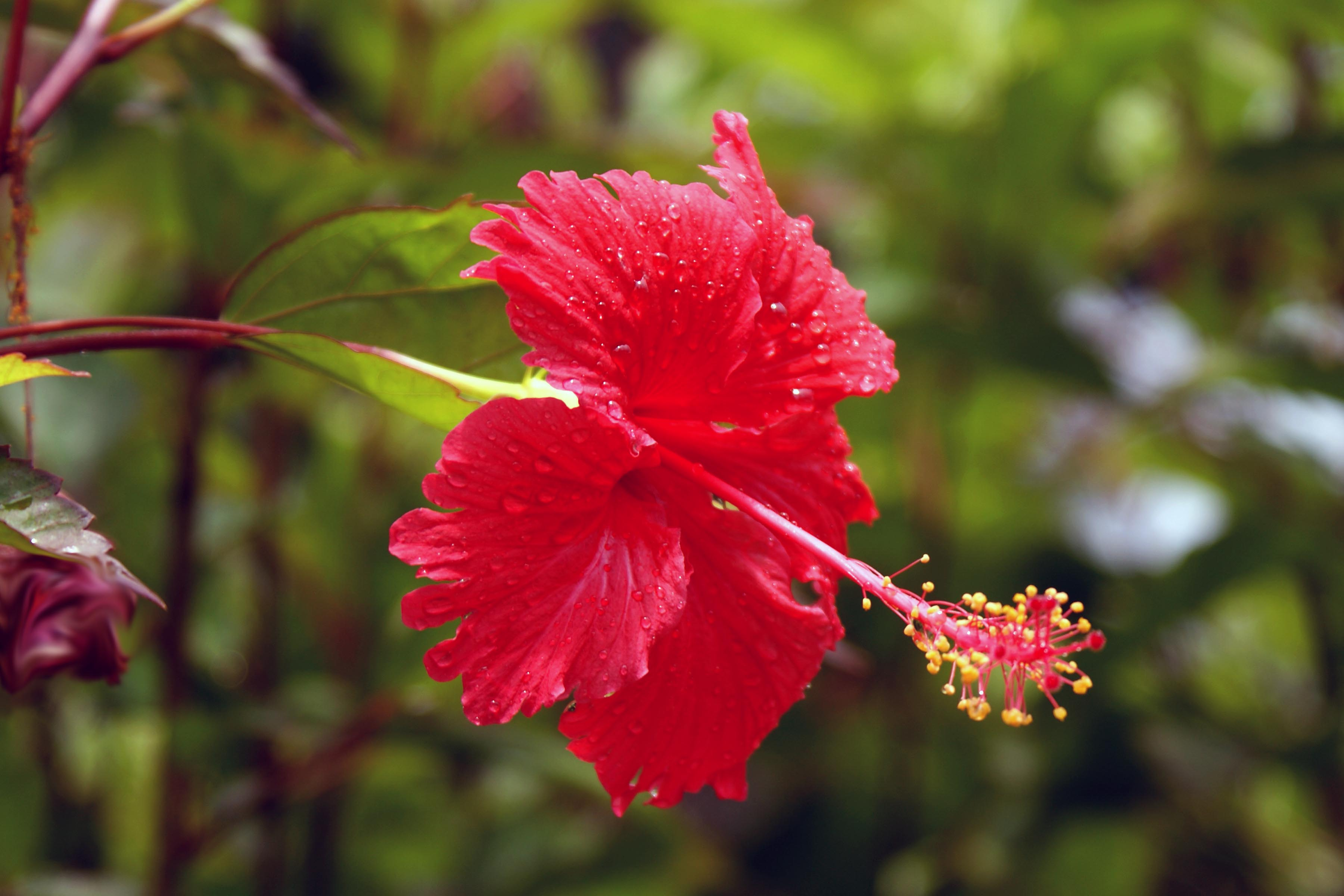
Hibiscus 'Andersonii'

- Hibiscus 'Andersonii'
- Hibiscus 'Andee'
- Hibiscus 'Angel's Wings'
- Hibiscus 'Anna Elizabeth'
- Hibiscus 'Anna Nicole'
- Hibiscus 'Antique Rose'
- Hibiscus 'Antique Treasure'
- Hibiscus 'Apple Blossom'
- Hibiscus 'Aztec Sun'
- Hibiscus 'Banana Orange-Sherbert'
- Hibiscus 'Beautifil Desire'
- Hibiscus 'Bebop'
- Hibiscus 'Belle du Jour'
- Hibiscus 'Bessie'
- Hibiscus 'Black Baron'
- Hibiscus 'Black Beauty'
- Hibiscus 'Black Dragon'
- Hibiscus 'Black Dream'
- Hibiscus 'Black Night'
- Hibiscus 'Blueblood'
- Hibiscus 'Blue Ballerina'
- Hibiscus 'Blue Bayou'
- Hibiscus 'Blues In The Night'
- Hibiscus 'Bold & Beautiful'
- Hibiscus 'Bon Vivant'
- Hibiscus 'Briar Patch'
- Hibiscus 'Bright Horizon'
- Hibiscus 'Brilliant'
- Hibiscus 'Burnished Gold'
- Hibiscus 'Butterfly'
- Hibiscus 'Candy'
- Hibiscus 'Cashmere Wind'
- Hibiscus 'Chad'
- Hibiscus 'Chariots of Fire'
- Hibiscus 'Charles Schmidt'
- Hibiscus 'Charlie's Angels'
- Hibiscus 'Chere'
- Hibiscus 'Chinese Lantern'
- Hibiscus 'Coloring Book'
- Hibiscus 'Confection Perfection'

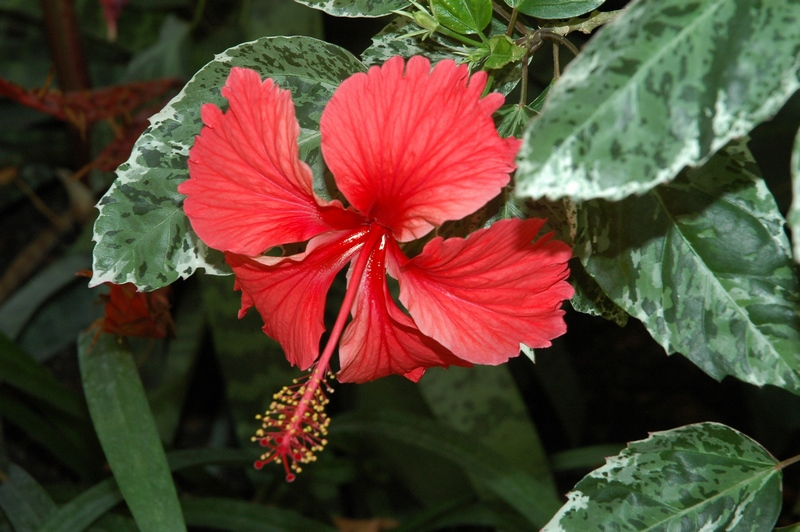
Hibiscus 'Cooperi'

- Hibiscus 'Cooperi'
- Hibiscus 'Cosmic Gold'
- Hibiscus 'Creole Belle'
- Hibiscus 'Creole Lady'
- Hibiscus 'Crimson Kiss'
- Hibiscus 'Crimson Rays'
- Hibiscus 'Crystal Pink'
- Hibiscus 'Cuban Variety'
- Hibiscus 'Daddy's Girl'

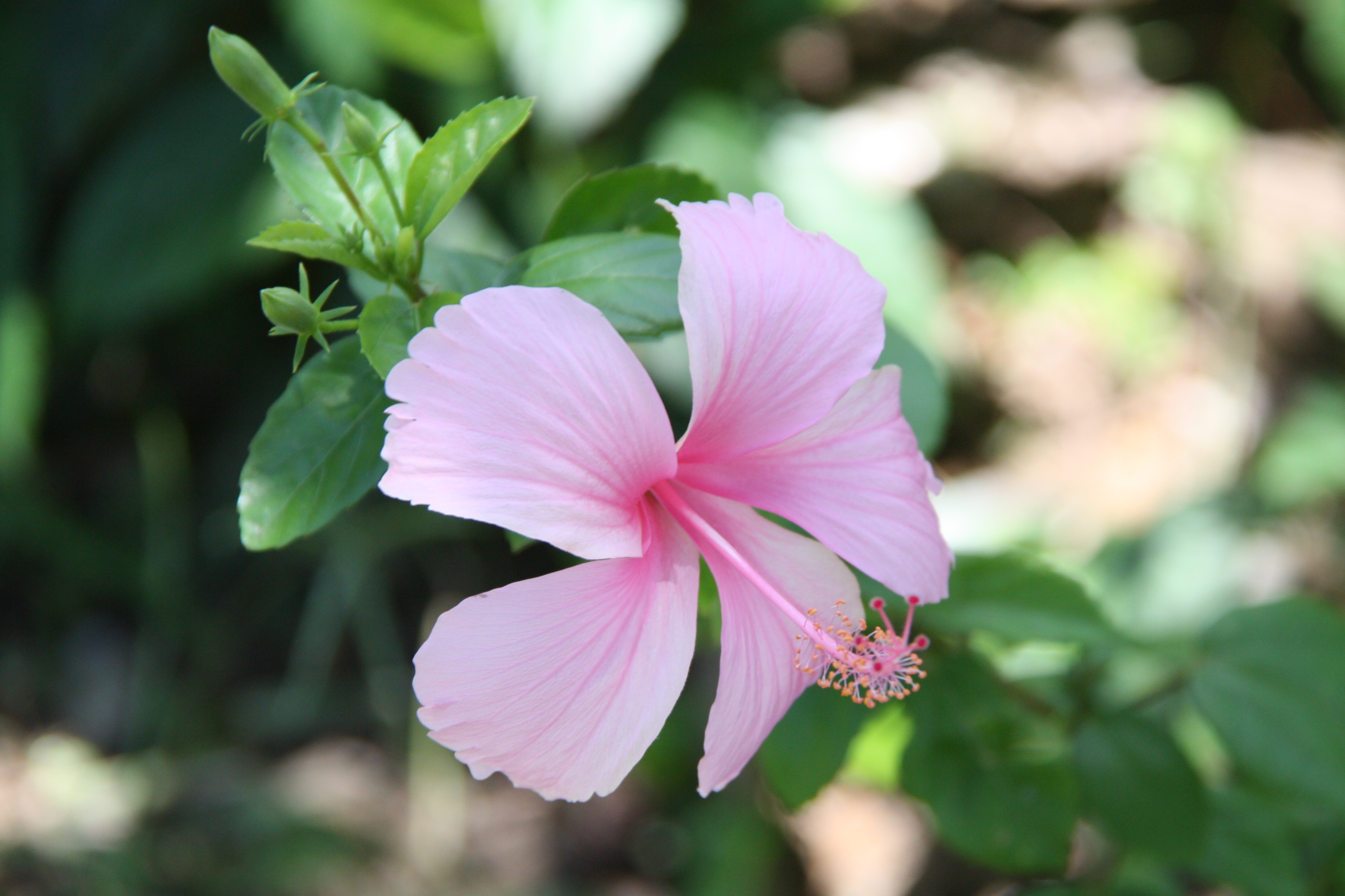
Hibiscus 'Dainty Pink'

- Hibiscus 'Dainty Pink'

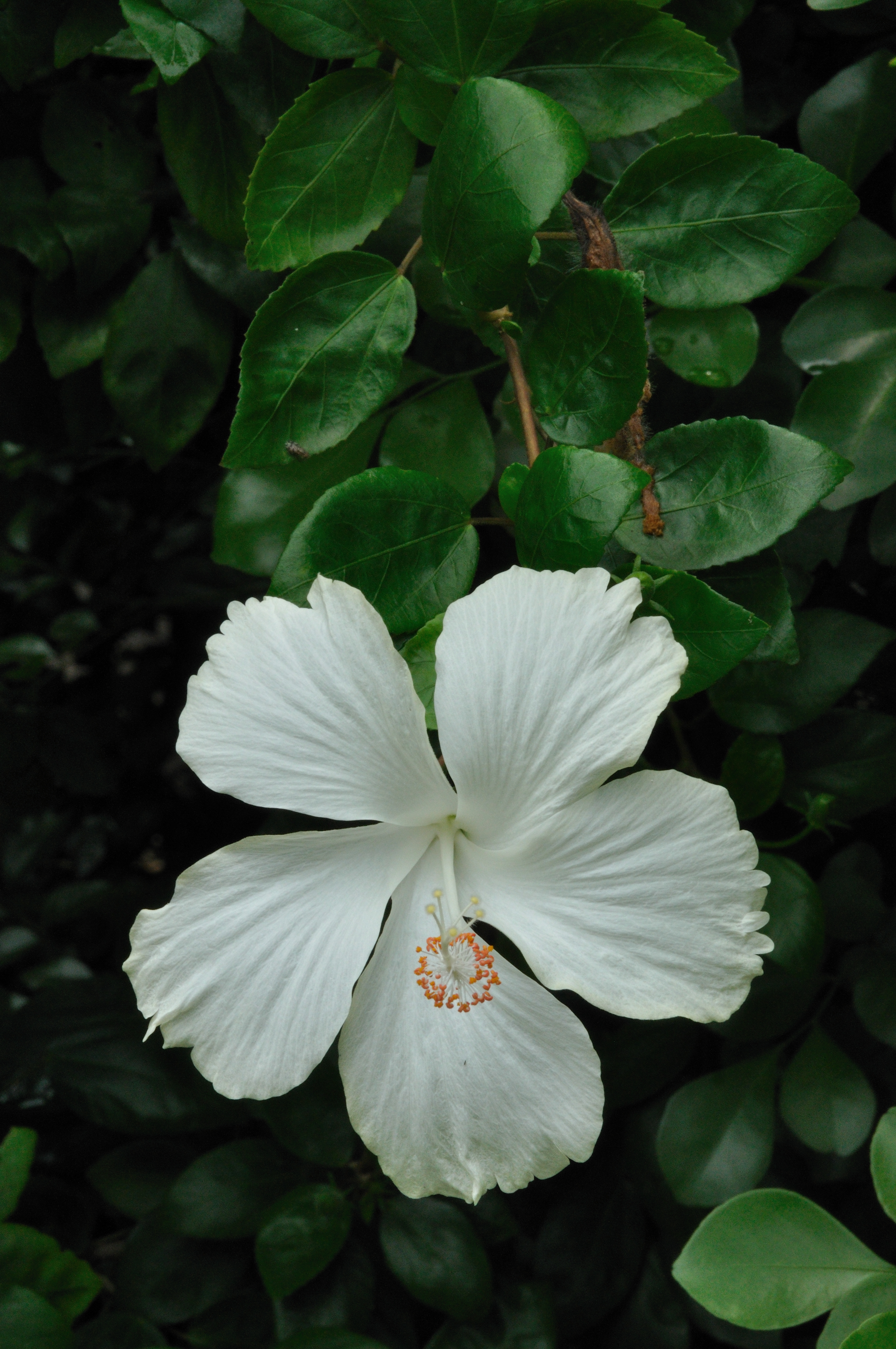
Hibiscus 'Dainty White'

- Hibiscus 'Dainty White'
- Hibiscus 'Dark Charm'
- Hibiscus 'Desert Sun'
- Hibiscus 'Donna Lyn'

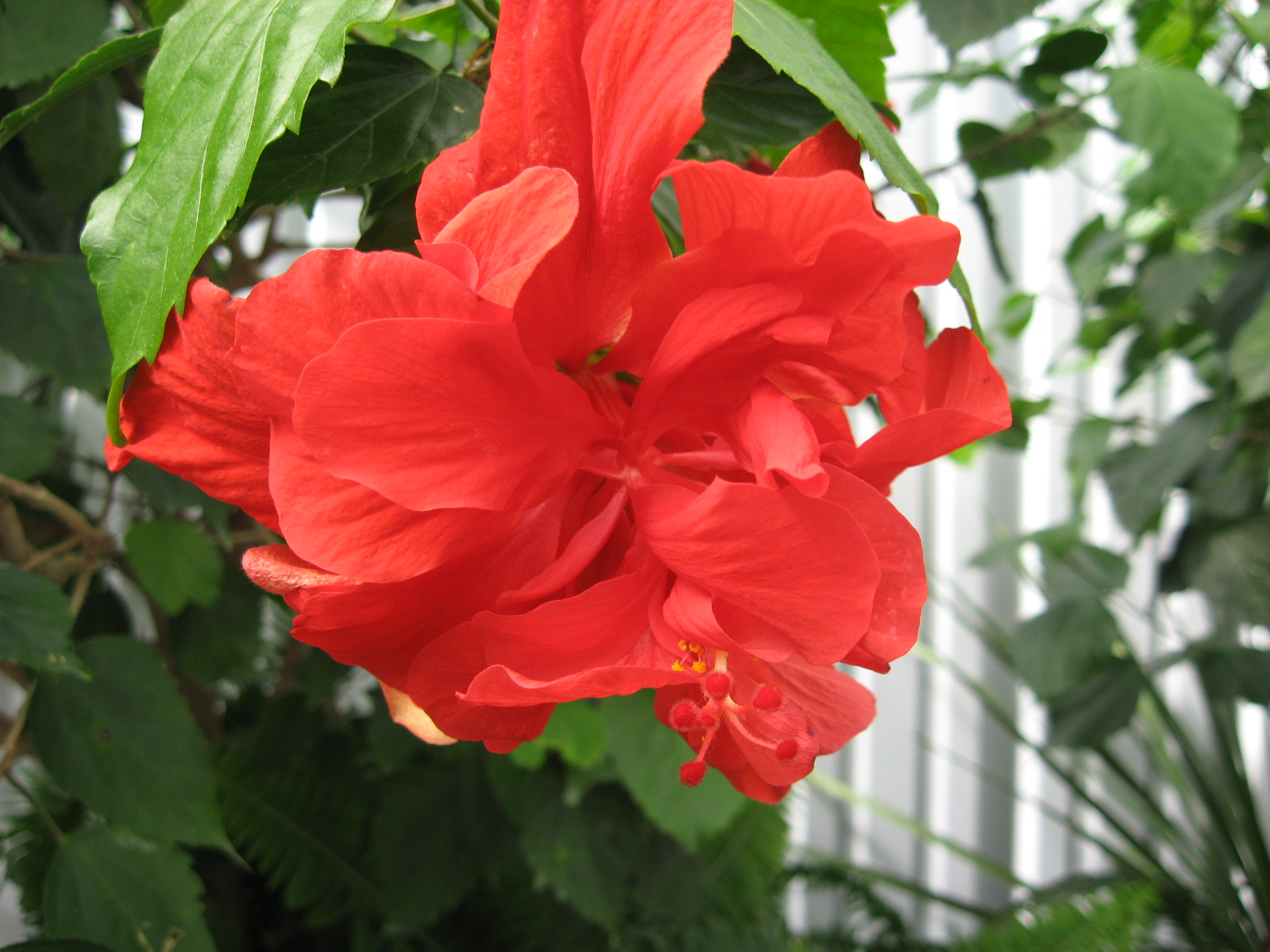
Hibiscus 'Double Psyche'

- Hibiscus 'Double Psyche'
- Hibiscus 'Dragon's Breath'
- Hibiscus 'Elderberry'

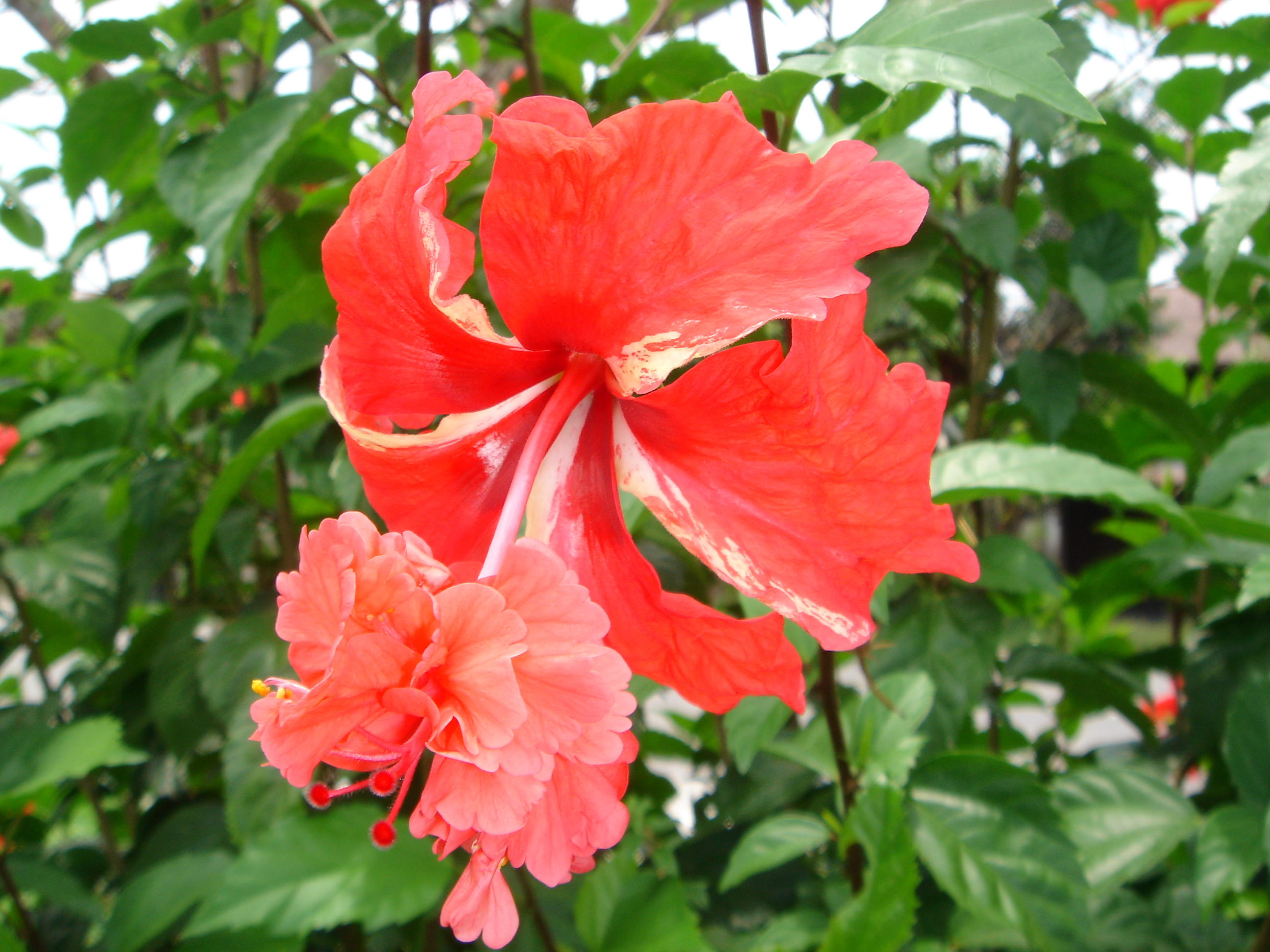
Hibiscus 'El Capitolio'

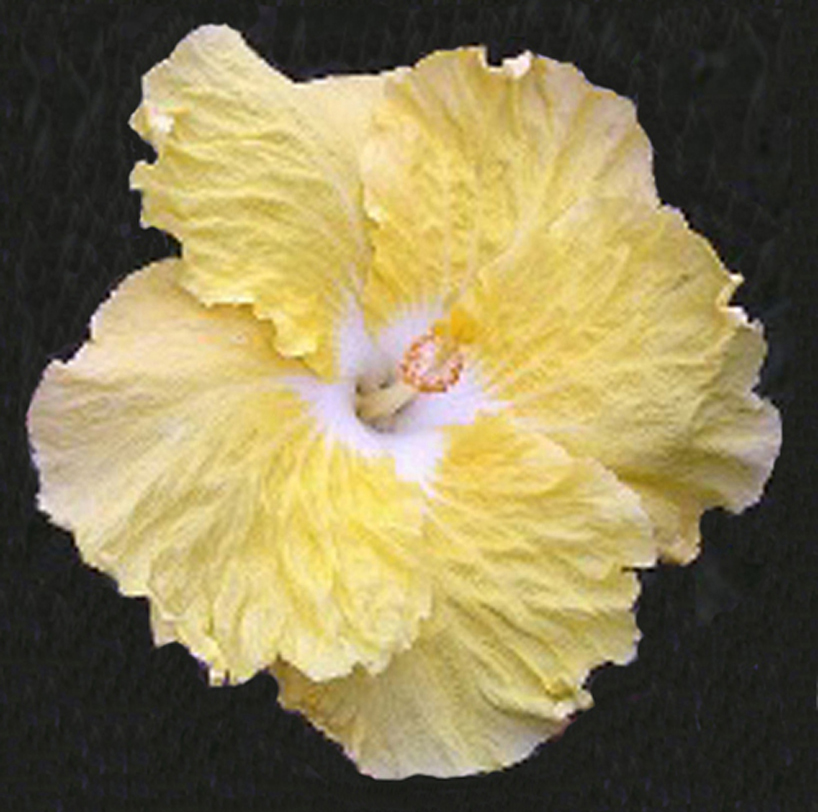
Hibiscus rosa-sinensis 'Kinchen's Yellow'

- Hibiscus 'El Capitolio'
- Hibiscus 'El Capitolio Triple'
- Hibiscus 'Electric Orange'
- Hibiscus 'Erin Rachael'
- Hibiscus 'Elephant Ear'
- Hibiscus 'Estelle K'
- Hibiscus 'Exploding Love'
- Hibiscus 'Fat Actress'
- Hibiscus 'Feelin' Blue'
- Hibiscus 'Fiji Island'
- Hibiscus 'First Love'
- Hibiscus 'Fifth Dimension'
- Hibiscus 'Fort Myers'
- Hibiscus 'Fourth Of July'
- Hibiscus 'Gabriel'
- Hibiscus 'Gator Magic'
- Hibiscus 'General Cortes'
- Hibiscus 'Georgia Thunder'
- Hibiscus 'Going Green'
- Hibiscus 'Gold Rain'
- Hibiscus 'Great White'
- Hibiscus 'Halley's Comet'
- Hibiscus 'Harvest Moon'
- Hibiscus 'Hawaiian Salmon'
- Hibiscus 'Headmaster'
- Hibiscus 'Heaven Scent'
- Hibiscus 'Her Majesty'
- Hibiscus 'Herm Geller'
- Hibiscus 'Hilo Island'
- Hibiscus 'High Voltage'
- Hibiscus 'Honey Do'
- Hibiscus 'Hot Pepper'
- Hibiscus 'Hot Red Cooperii'
- Hibiscus 'Hula Girl'
- Hibiscus 'Ice Fairy'
- Hibiscus 'Isobel Beard'
- Hibiscus 'It's a Wonderful Life'
- Hibiscus 'Janys'
- Hibiscus 'Kinchen's Yellow'
- Hibiscus 'Kopper King'
- Hibiscus 'Lady Adele'
- Hibiscus 'Lady In Waiting'
- Hibiscus 'Lilac Wine'
- Hibiscus 'Little Girl'
- Hibiscus 'Living Legend'
- Hibiscus 'Luoise Bennet'
- Hibiscus 'Love Story'

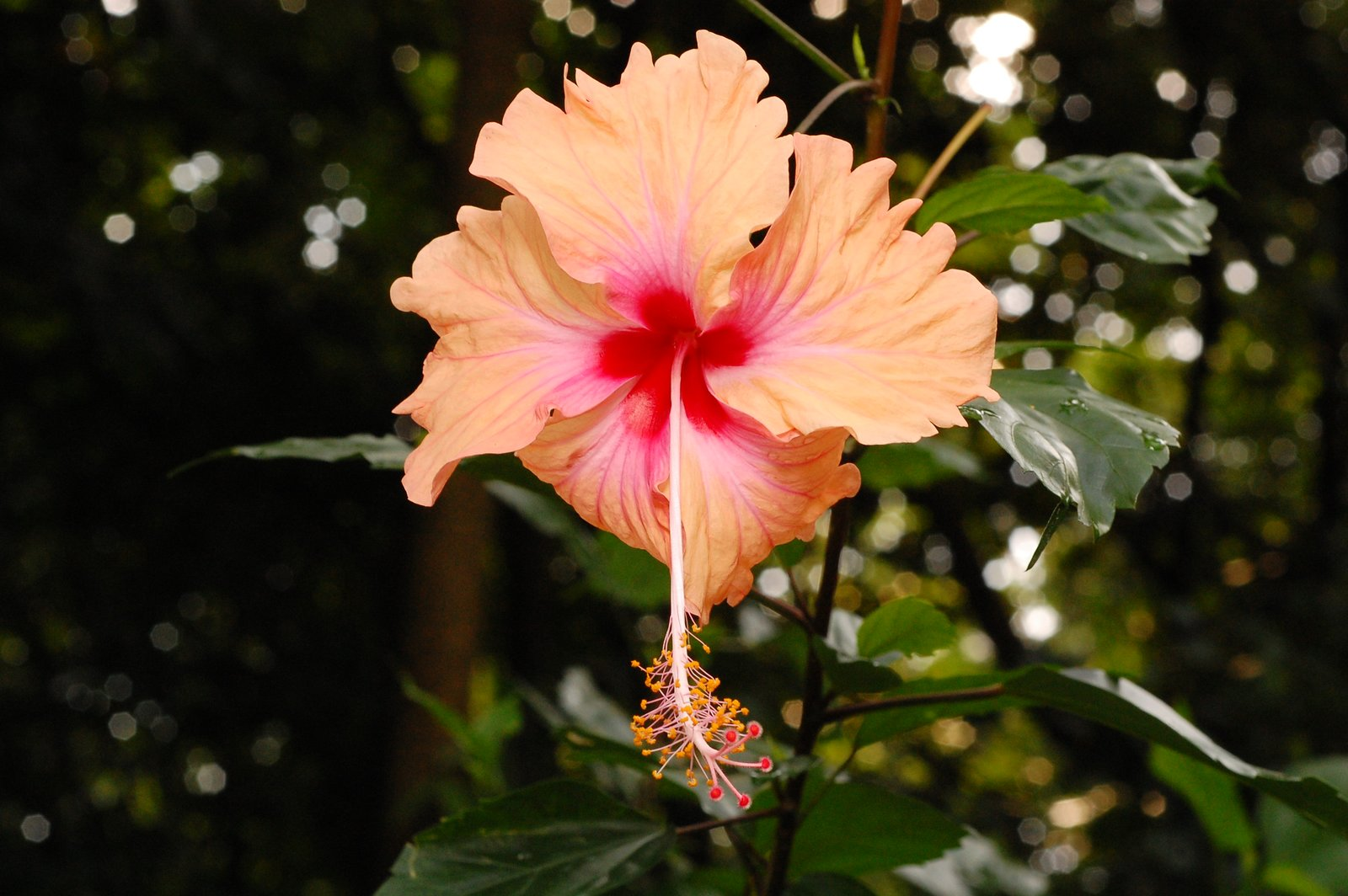
Hibiscus 'Madeline Champion'

- Hibiscus 'Madeline Champion'
- Hibiscus 'Magic Moments'

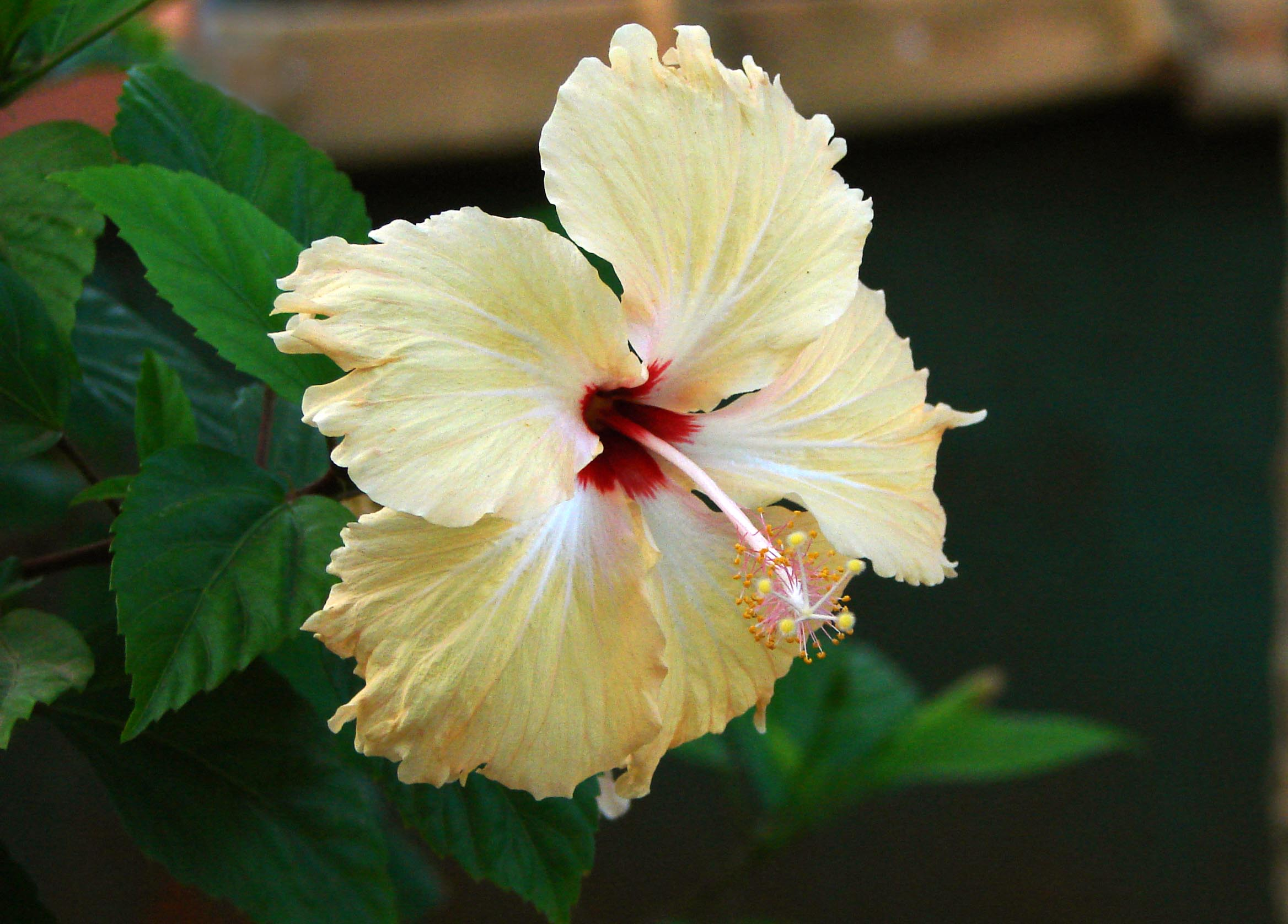
Hibiscus 'Mango Dainty'

- Hibiscus 'Mango Dainty'
- Hibiscus 'Maroon Stars'
- Hibiscus 'Maui Masterpiece'
- Hibiscus 'Mikey'
- Hibiscus 'Midnight Blue'
- Hibiscus 'Mini Skirt'
- Hibiscus 'Miss Liberty'
- Hibiscus 'Moon Jelly Fish'
- Hibiscus 'Morning Star'
- Hibiscus 'Mr. Ace'
- Hibiscus 'My Maria'
- Hibiscus 'Mystic Medallion'
- Hibiscus 'Nanette Peach'
- Hibiscus 'Night Fever'
- Hibiscus 'Night Fire'
- Hibiscus 'Norman Lee'

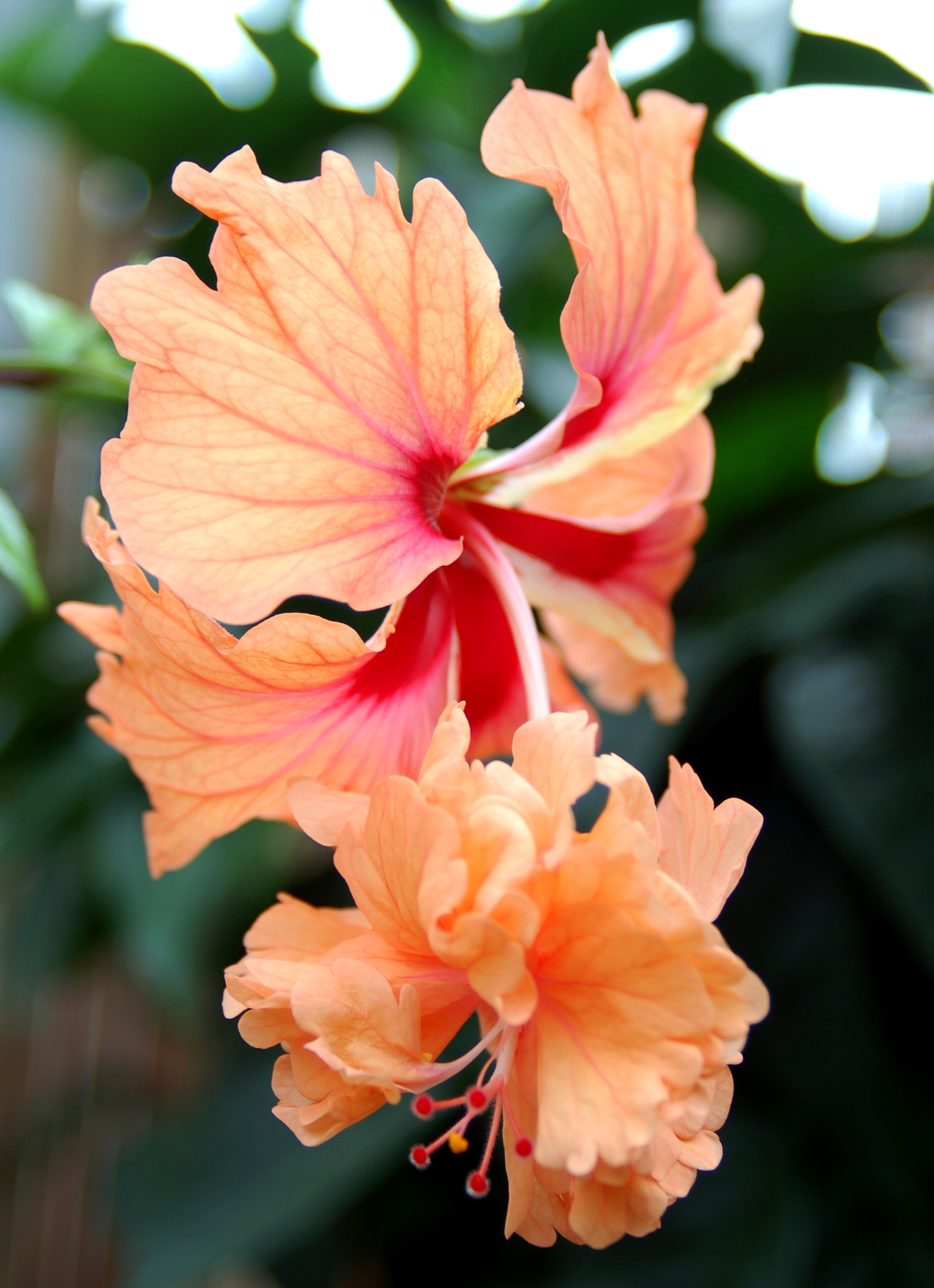
Hibiscus 'Orange El Capitolio'

- Hibiscus 'Orange El Capitolio'
- Hibiscus 'Palm Springs'
- Hibiscus 'Painted lady'
- Hibiscus 'Panorama'
- Hibiscus 'Pineapple Sundae'

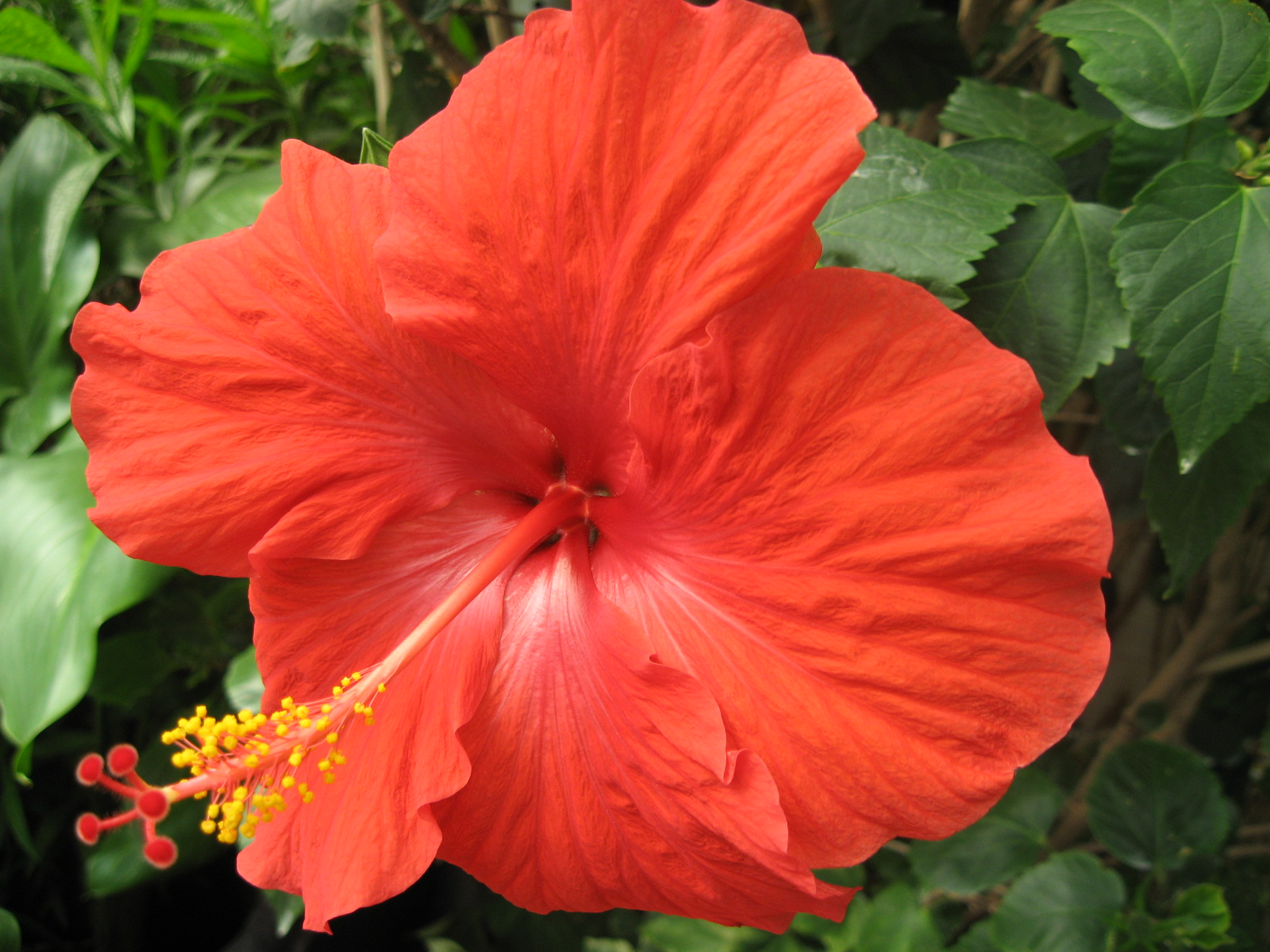
Hibiscus 'President'

- Hibiscus 'President'
- Hibiscus 'Prima Ballerina'

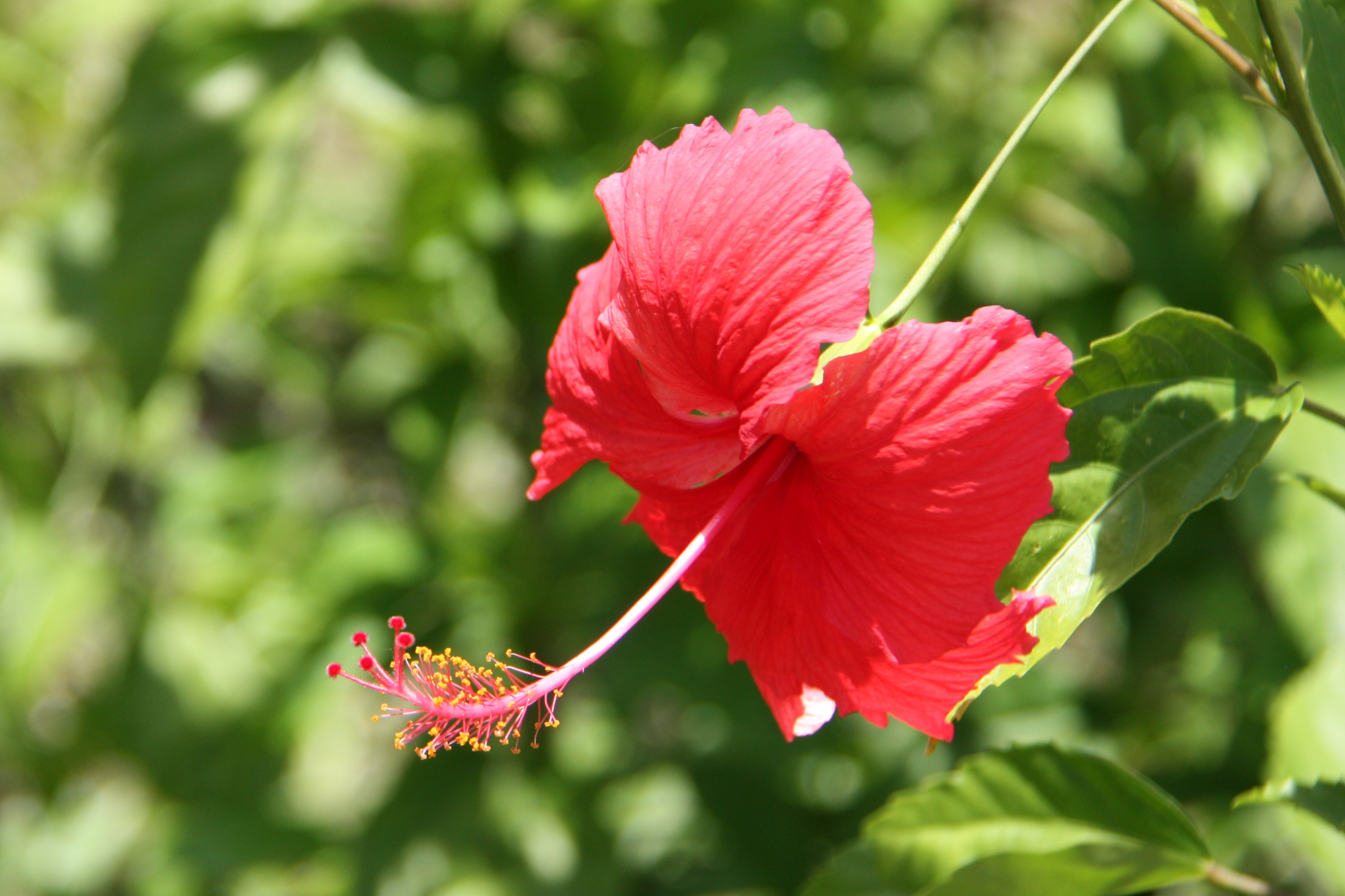
Hibiscus 'Psyche'

- Hibiscus 'Psyche'
- Hibiscus 'Raging Bull'
- Hibiscus 'Rain Drop'
- Hibiscus 'Red Hot'
- Hibiscus 'Red Snapper'
- Hibiscus 'Red Wave'
- Hibiscus 'Rise and Shine'
- Hibiscus 'Robin Hood'
- Hibiscus 'Rocket's Red Glare'
- Hibiscus 'Rockin' Robin'
- Hibiscus 'Romeo'
- Hibiscus 'Roseflake'
- Hibiscus 'Rose Of China'
- Hibiscus 'Ros Etsy'
- Hibiscus 'Saffron'
- Hibiscus 'Schizopetalus'
- Hibiscus 'Silver Memories'
- Hibiscus 'Seminole pink'
- Hibiscus 'Simple Pleasures'
- Hibiscus 'Sleeping Beauty'
- Hibiscus 'Snowflake'
- Hibiscus 'Snow Queen'
- Hibiscus 'Song Sung Blue'
- Hibiscus 'Sparkling Water'
- Hibiscus 'Sprinkle Rain'
- Hibiscus 'Sunshower'
- Hibiscus 'Super Star'
- Hibiscus 'Sweet Violet'

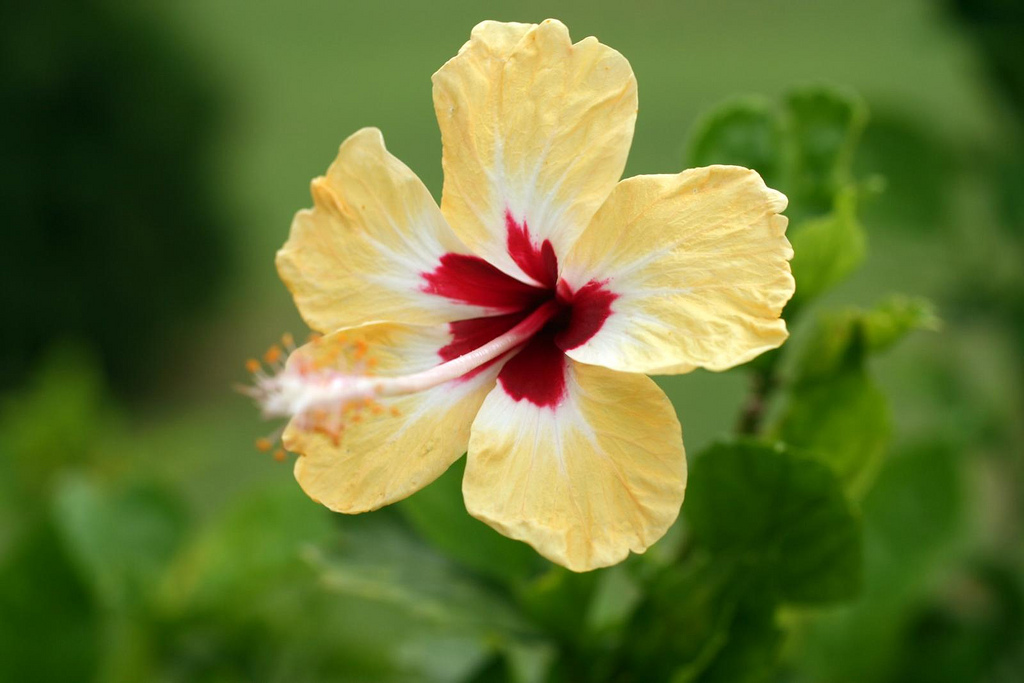
Hibiscus 'Sylvia Goodman'

- Hibiscus 'Sylvia Goodman'
- Hibiscus 'Tammy'
- Hibiscus 'The Path'
- Hibiscus 'Tigerama'
- Hibiscus 'Topaz Glory'
- Hibiscus 'Tylene'
- Hibiscus 'Vanilla Sundae'
- Hibiscus 'Vin Beaujolias'
- Hibiscus 'Wall Flower'
- Hibiscus 'West Coast Red'
- Hibiscus 'White Wings'
- Hibiscus 'White Swan'
- Hibiscus 'Wild Child'
- Hibiscus 'Winter Lights'
