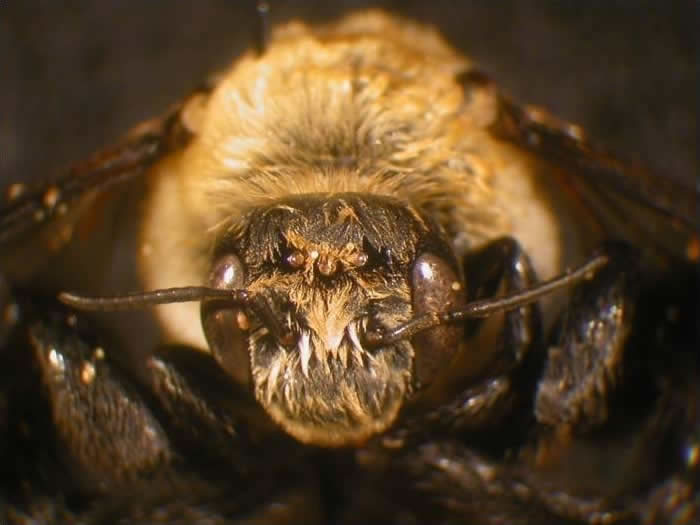

Scientific classification
- Kingdom: Animalia
- Phylum: Arthropoda
- Clade: Pancrustacea
- Class: Insecta
- Order: Hymenoptera
- Family: Apidae
- Genus: Ptilothrix
- Species: P. bombiformis

Binomial name
- Ptilothrix bombiformis (Cresson, 1878)

= Ptilothrix bombiformis =

Species of bee

Ptilothrix bombiformis, known generally as the hibiscus bee or eastern digger bee, is a species of solitary chimney bee in the family Apidae. It is found in the eastern United States and, rarely, in southern Ontario, Canada.

== Description ==
The hibiscus bee has a large, rounded body similar to a bumblebee, earning it the species epithet bombiformis (bumblebee-shaped). The hibiscus bee has yellow hairs on its head, mesosoma, and on the first segment of the metasoma. The remaining segments of the metasoma are black. Both males and females have very long, hairy legs, but the hind legs of the female are visibly hairier, as they have plumose branched hairs for transporting pollen and water to the nest.

== Habitat ==
The hibiscus bee has three main habitat requirements: the presence of Hibiscus flowers, water, and an area of hard-packed, dried mud ground in which to nest. Typically, these requirements are all met in a marshy area suitable for Hibiscus plants (commonly called hibiscus or mallows). However, these adaptable bees also use human-altered landscapes, finding pollen in hibiscus landscaping plants, nesting sites on dirt roads and levees, and sources of water such as puddles created from sprinkler systems.

== Ecology ==
The hibiscus bee is a specialist in Hibiscus pollen; their emergence coincides with the hibiscus bloom period. In addition to the native Hibiscus species found in its range, such as Hibiscus moscheutos and Hibiscus laevis, it will also collect pollen from the introduced Hibiscus syriacus, commonly called rose-of-Sharon. In eastern Texas, it is a key pollinator of the endangered Hibiscus dasycalyx. In a 2025 study on this plant, while the flowers were visited by generalist pollinators including beetles and skippers, the hibiscus bee visited much more frequently, and only their visits were associated with pollination.

== Reproductive behavior ==
Male hibiscus bees sit in wait for females to visit hibiscus flowers, which they defend from other visitors, attacking and chasing them from the flower. However, the defending male is not always successful, and may be ousted by an interloping male. These fights are useful for the hibiscus, as pollen gets knocked around, increasing pollination efficacy. Mating then takes place when a female visits the flower.

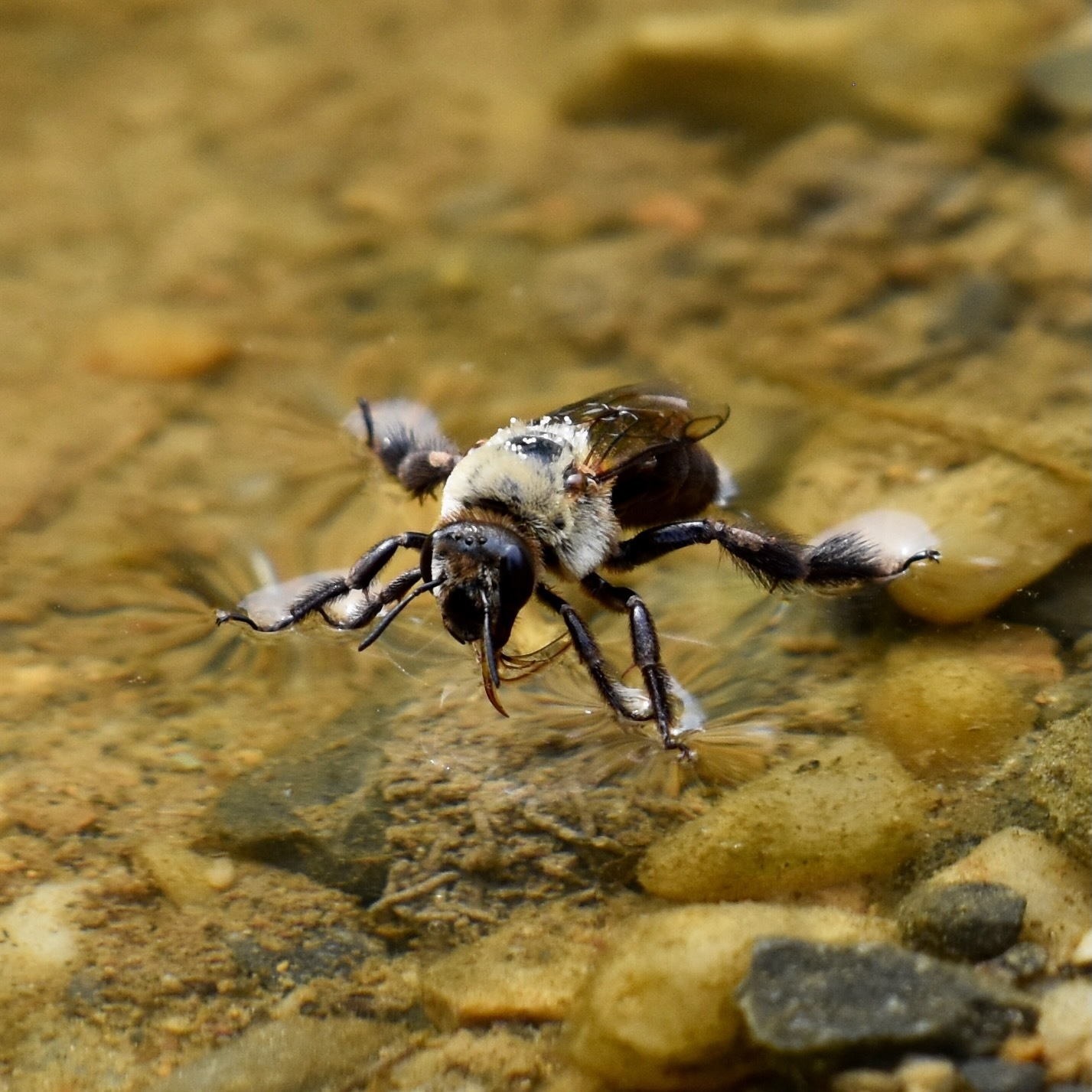
A female hibiscus bee standing on water to collect it for nest construction

Hibiscus bees are solitary, meaning that unlike eusocial bees, they do not form colonies or construct hives. Females are tolerant of nearby nests, and hibiscus bee nests are often located close together; generations of bees have been observed using the same general site for decades or more.

== Water walking and nest construction ==
The female bee gathers water for nest construction by standing or skating on the surface of the water. She excavates a nest hole in dried mud ground, softening the ground before and during excavation with the water she gathers over dozens of trips. After she digs a hole in the ground, she constructs a collar of dried mud around the entrance, which looks like small turret. The interior of the nest is a simple vertical shaft. At the bottom, she waterproofs the burrow with a mixture of wax and soil, forming a cell into which she deposits an egg and a ball of hibiscus pollen for the larva to feed on after hatching. She seals this cell shut with a snail-spiral-shaped plug of wax-soil. She pushes soil into the nest hole and then chooses whether to construct another cell on top; nests typically contain one to two cells. Either way, she completes the nest and her parental duties by rehydrating nearby soil (often from the turret) and using it to create a mud cap.

== Life cycle ==
As the larva feeds, it excretes feces largely consisting of pollen exines (outer shells) over the inside of the cell. After a few weeks of feeding, the larva creates a cocoon in which to survive the winter. After metamorphosis, they then emerge as adult bees the following summer. This is a univoltine insect species, meaning there is one generation a year without overlap, as adult hibiscus bees do not survive the winter.
