= Hibiscus 'Albo Lacinatus' =

Flowering plant cultivar

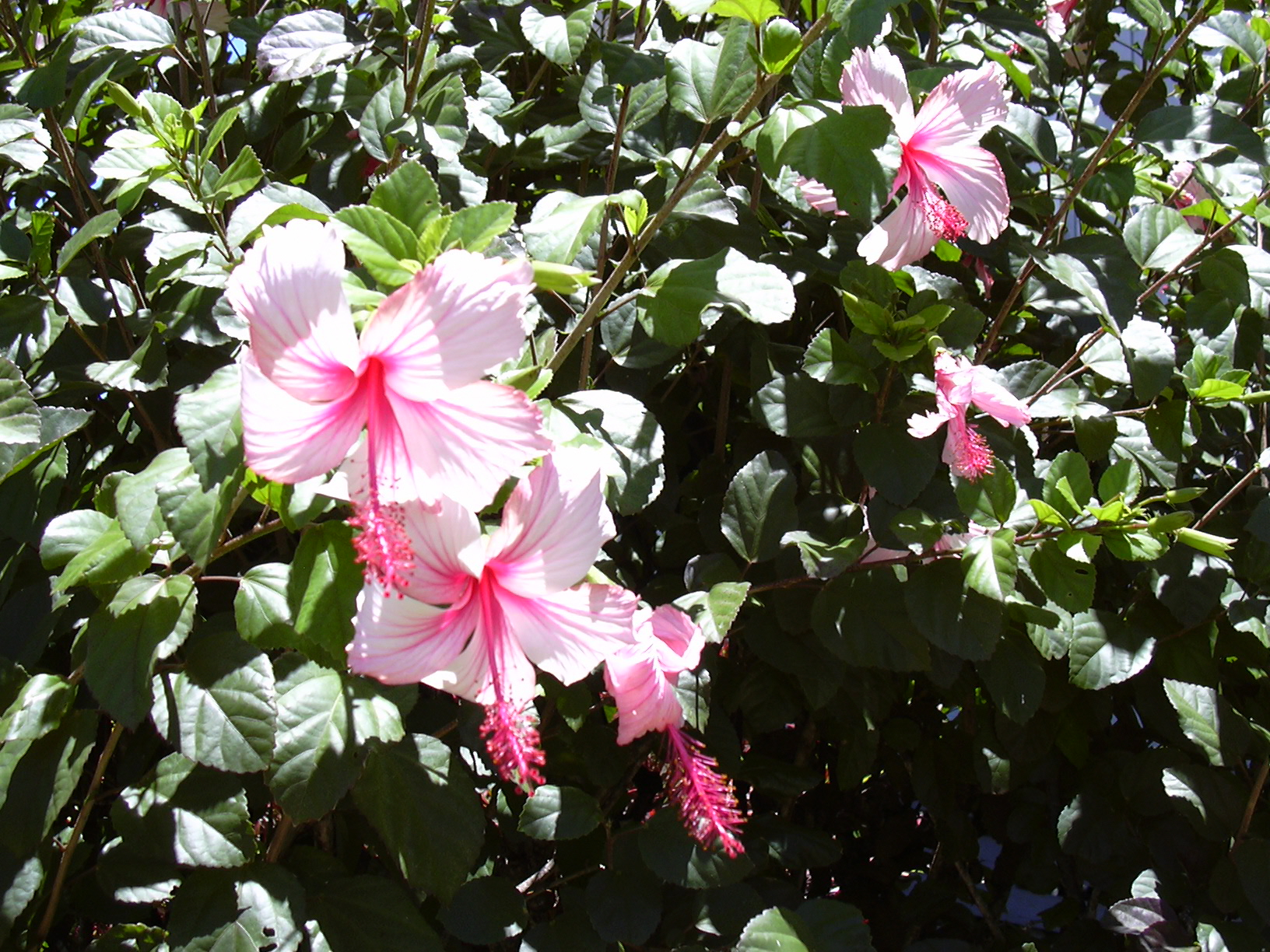
- Genus: Hibiscus
- Hybrid parentage: Hibiscus arnottianus × Hibiscus schizopetalus
- Cultivar: 'Albo Lacinatus'

Hibiscus 'Albo Lacinatus' is a cultivar of Hibiscus that was hybridized no later than the late 1700s or early 1800s, making it one of the earliest Hibiscus cultivars. A tropical hibiscus, it is one of the fastest growing, tallest, and most vigorous of all tropical hibiscus species and cultivars.

== Description ==
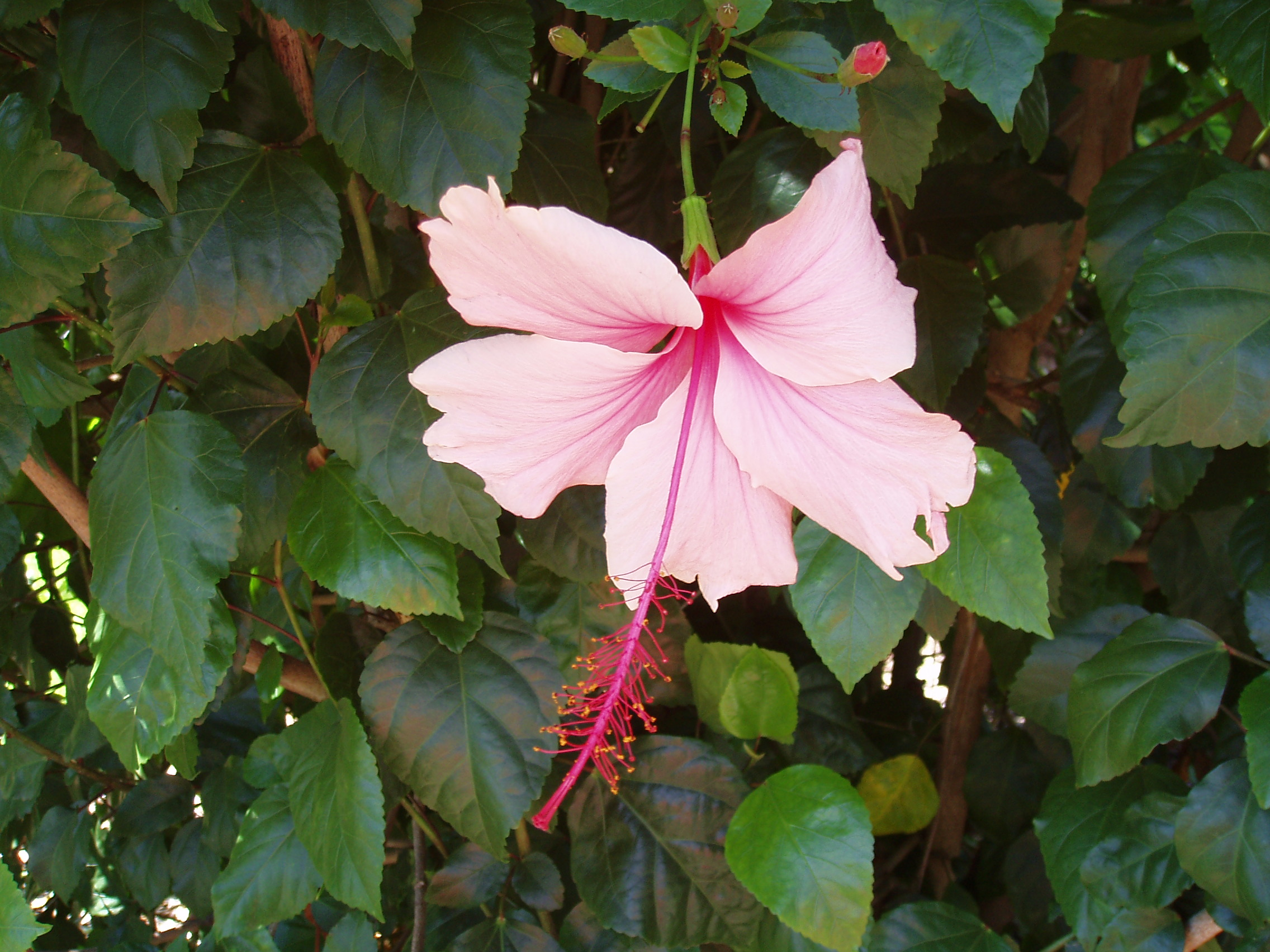

Featuring an evergreen foliage, it grows 4.7-6 m tall (15-20 ft) and has a width of 2.4-3 m (8-10 ft). Fast growing, it reaches of 6 metres (20 ft) or more in about 5 years. Its pale pink flowers have a long blooming period, lasting from early spring to early winter.

It is similar in appearance to the 'Dainty Pink' cultivar.

== Cultivation ==
Heat and drought tolerant, it can be grown as a specimen tree or as a hedge bush, and it's hardy from zone 8b to 11. It requires winter protection in colder areas.

== See also ==
- List of Hibiscus cultivars
