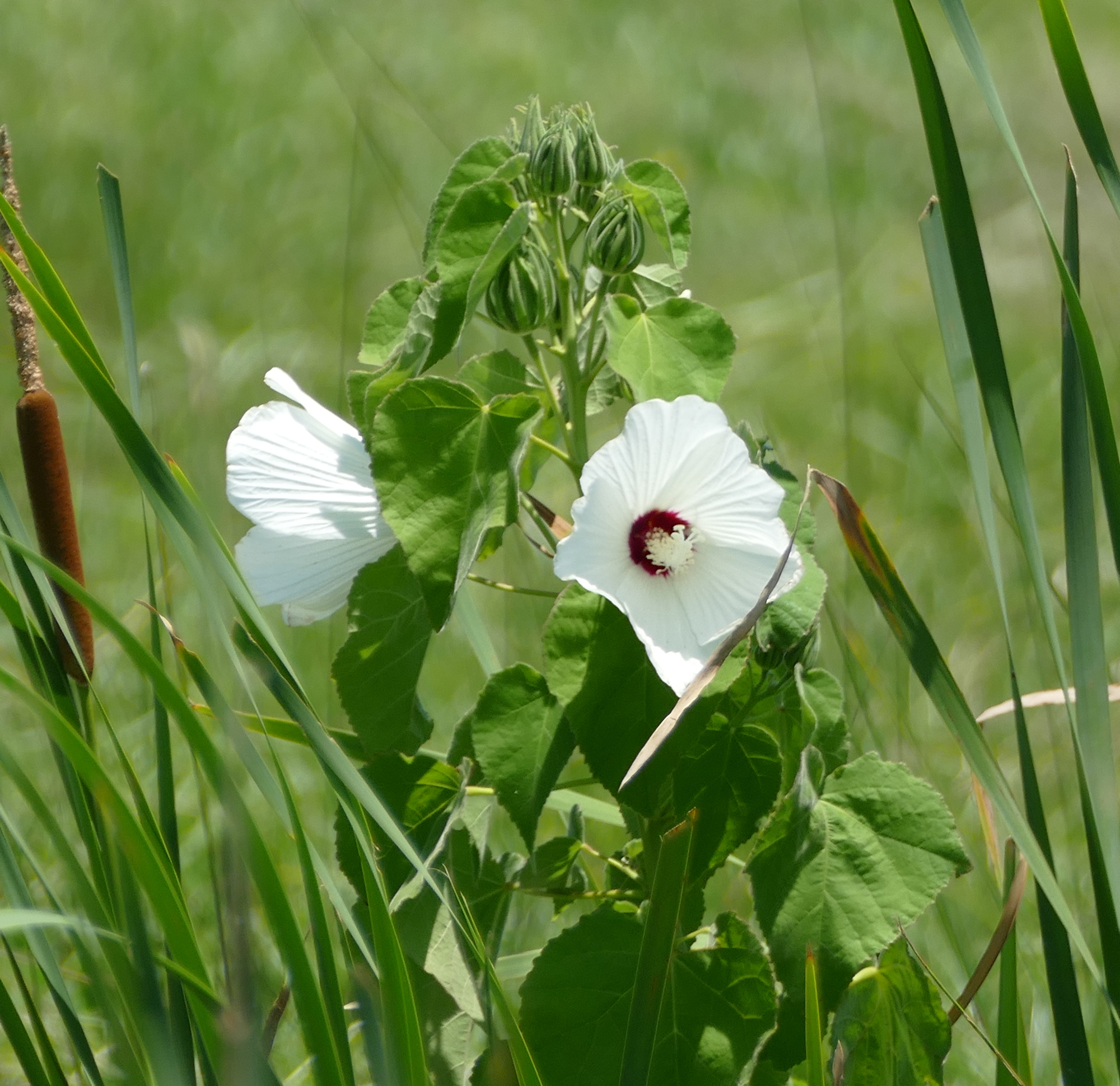

Scientific classification
- Kingdom: Plantae
- Clade: Tracheophytes
- Clade: Angiosperms
- Clade: Eudicots
- Clade: Rosids
- Order: Malvales
- Family: Malvaceae
- Genus: Hibiscus
- Species: H. moscheutos
- Subspecies: H. m. subsp. lasiocarpos

Trinomial name
- Hibiscus moscheutos subsp. lasiocarpos (Cav.) M.M.Hanes & R.L.Barrett

Synonyms
- Hibiscus californicus Kellogg; Hibiscus langloisii Greene; Hibiscus lasiocarpos Cav.; Hibiscus lasiocarpos var. californicus (Kellogg) L.H.Bailey; Hibiscus lasiocarpos var. occidentalis A.Gray; Hibiscus leucophyllus Shiller; Hibiscus moscheutos var. lasiocarpos (Cav.) B.L.Turner; Hibiscus moscheutos var. occidentalis Torr.; Hibiscus platanoides Greene

= Muenchhusia moscheutos subsp. lasiocarpos =

Species of flowering plant

Muenchhusia moscheutos subsp. lasiocarpos, the hairy-fruited hibiscus, wooly rose-mallow, or rosemallow is a subspecies of Muenchhusia moscheutos native to much of the southeastern and south-central United States, as well as parts of northeastern Mexico, California, and Utah.

== Description ==
It is a large, bushy perennial herb with sprawling stems reaching one to two meters long. The leaves are heart-shaped, toothed, and pointed, and generally between 6 and 10 centimeters long. The inflorescence holds large showy, solitary flowers. Each flower has a cup of partly fused sepals beneath a layer of slender bracts. These may be covered in hairs or woolly fibers. The flower's large petals may be up to 10 centimeters long and are generally bright white with red bases. The stamen tube and anthers are white or cream. The fruit is a capsule 2.5–3 centimeters long containing spherical seeds.

== Taxonomy ==
It was first described as Hibiscus lasiocarpos by Antonio José Cavanilles in 1787. It was moved to the genus Muenchhusia Heist. ex Fabr. as Muenchhusia moscheutos subsp. lasiocarpos (Cav.) M.M.Hanes & R.L.Barrett by Margaret M. Hanes and Russell Lindsay Barrett in 2025.
