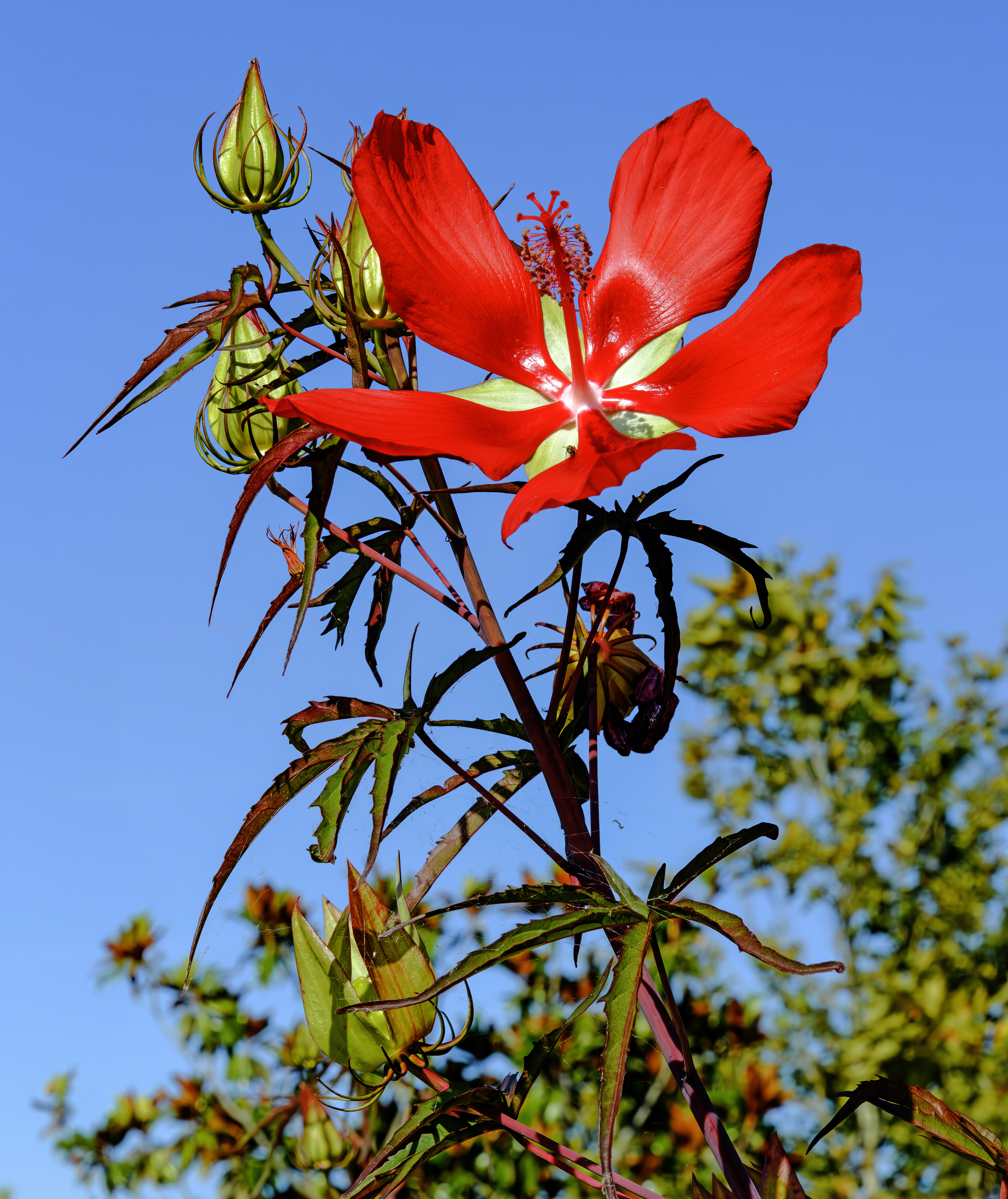

Conservation status
- Apparently Secure (NatureServe)

Scientific classification
- Kingdom: Plantae
- Clade: Embryophytes
- Clade: Tracheophytes
- Clade: Angiosperms
- Clade: Eudicots
- Clade: Rosids
- Order: Malvales
- Family: Malvaceae
- Genus: Hibiscus
- Species: H. coccineus

Binomial name
- Hibiscus coccineus (Medik.) Walter

Synonyms
- Hibiscus semilobatus

= Hibiscus coccineus =

Species of flowering plant

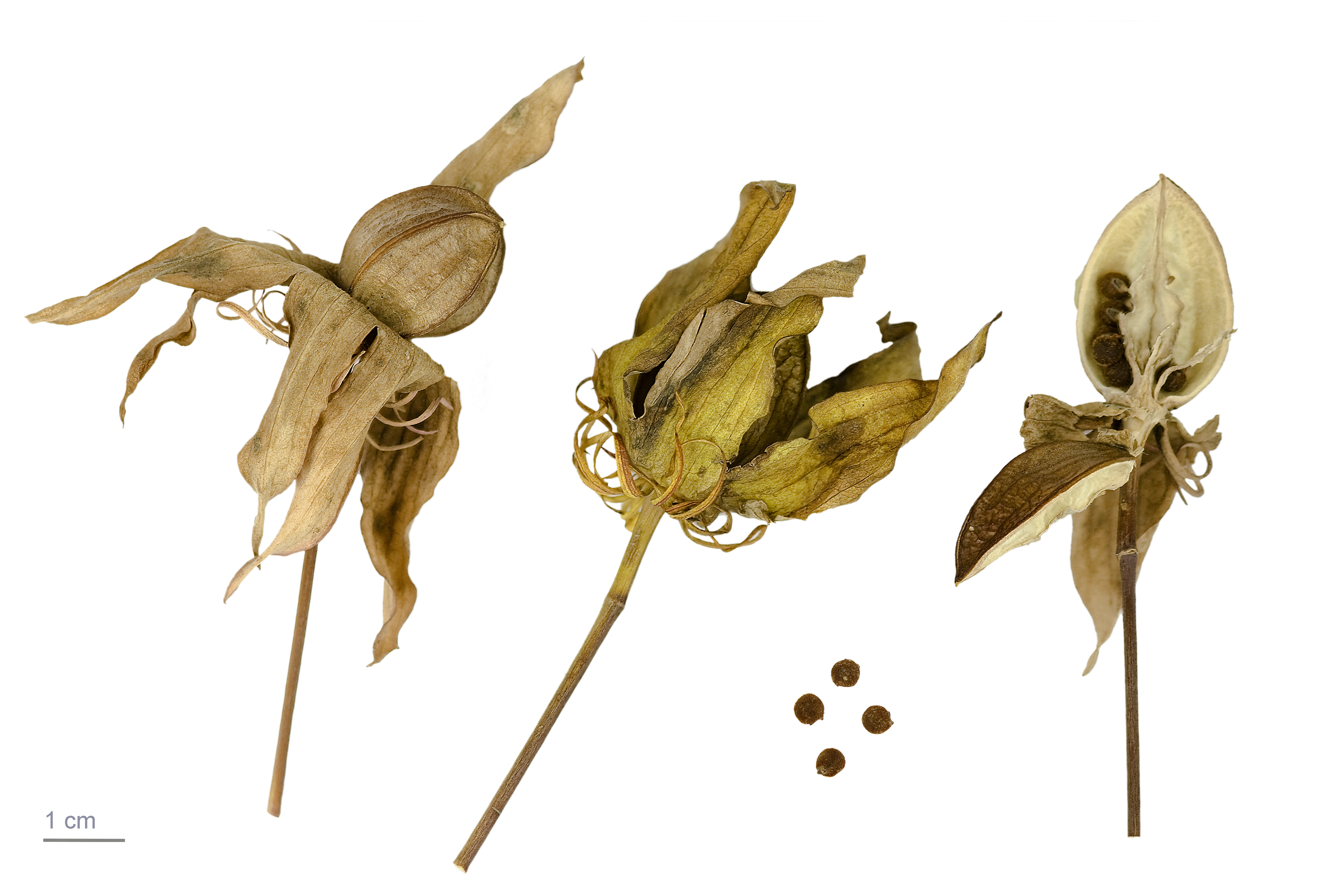
Hibiscus coccineus - MHNT

Hibiscus coccineus the scarlet rosemallow, is a hardy Hibiscus species, also known as Texas star, brilliant hibiscus and scarlet hibiscus. In 2025, the name was changed to Muenchhusia coccinea.

The plant is found in swamps, marshes and ditches on the coastal plain of the Southeastern United States. It is native from Southeastern Virginia south to Florida, then west to Louisiana. Despite its common name Texas star, the plant is not found naturally in Texas. In addition to the scarlet-flowering variety, a white-flowering variety is also known as the white Texas star or lone star hibiscus.

== Description ==
H. coccineus is a herbaceous perennial (it dies back during the winter) and grows 6–8 ft (1.8–2.4 m) tall. The palmately compound leaves are 5–6 in (13–15 cm) wide, and look much like those of the hemp plant, Cannabis sativa. It features bright scarlet flowers that have five petals and are reminiscent of hollyhock. These flowers are attractive to hummingbirds, butterflies and bees, including the specialized bee Ptilothrix bombiformis. The plant prefers to be grown in full sun with moist soil. It is hardy in USDA hardiness zones 6–9.

The Latin specific epithet coccineus means "coloured or dyed scarlet". The genus name is the Greek and Latin name for "mallow".
