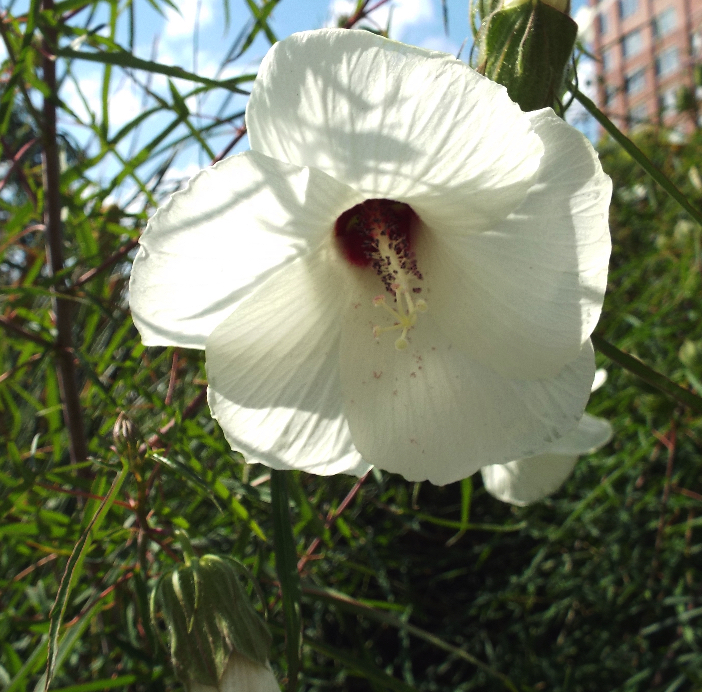

Conservation status
- Critically Imperiled (NatureServe)

- Threatened (ESA)

Scientific classification
- Kingdom: Plantae
- Clade: Tracheophytes
- Clade: Angiosperms
- Clade: Eudicots
- Clade: Rosids
- Order: Malvales
- Family: Malvaceae
- Genus: Hibiscus
- Species: H. dasycalyx

Binomial name
- Hibiscus dasycalyx S.F.Blake & Shiller

= Hibiscus dasycalyx =

Species of flowering plant

Hibiscus dasycalyx is a species of hibiscus known by the common name Neches River rosemallow. It is endemic to Texas in the United States, where there are three remaining natural populations and three introduced populations.

This woody perennial herb grows up to 2.3 meters tall. The leaves are T-shaped and have three lobes. The flower is white to pink in color with a deep red center. The five petals are up to four inches (10 cm) long. The sepals and bracteoles are fuzzy-haired. Flowering occurs in June through August, or into October when enough moisture is available. The seeds float on water.

This plant occurs in Cherokee, Harrison, Houston, and Trinity Counties in eastern Texas. There are a total of about 2000 individuals in natural populations and 210 introduced plants. The species grows in periodically inundated habitat types, such as floodplains, where it grows between the high and low water levels. It may grow next to standing water in swampy conditions, and the substrate is often saturated or submerged. The groundwater level is always less than 5 feet below the soil surface.

This species was listed as a federally threatened species protected by the Endangered Species Act of 1973 in 2013. Threats include herbicides and mowing. It is also threatened by cattle grazing and loss of wetland habitat. It is subject to hybridization with other hibiscus, such as Hibiscus laevis, and the species may experience genetic swamping.
