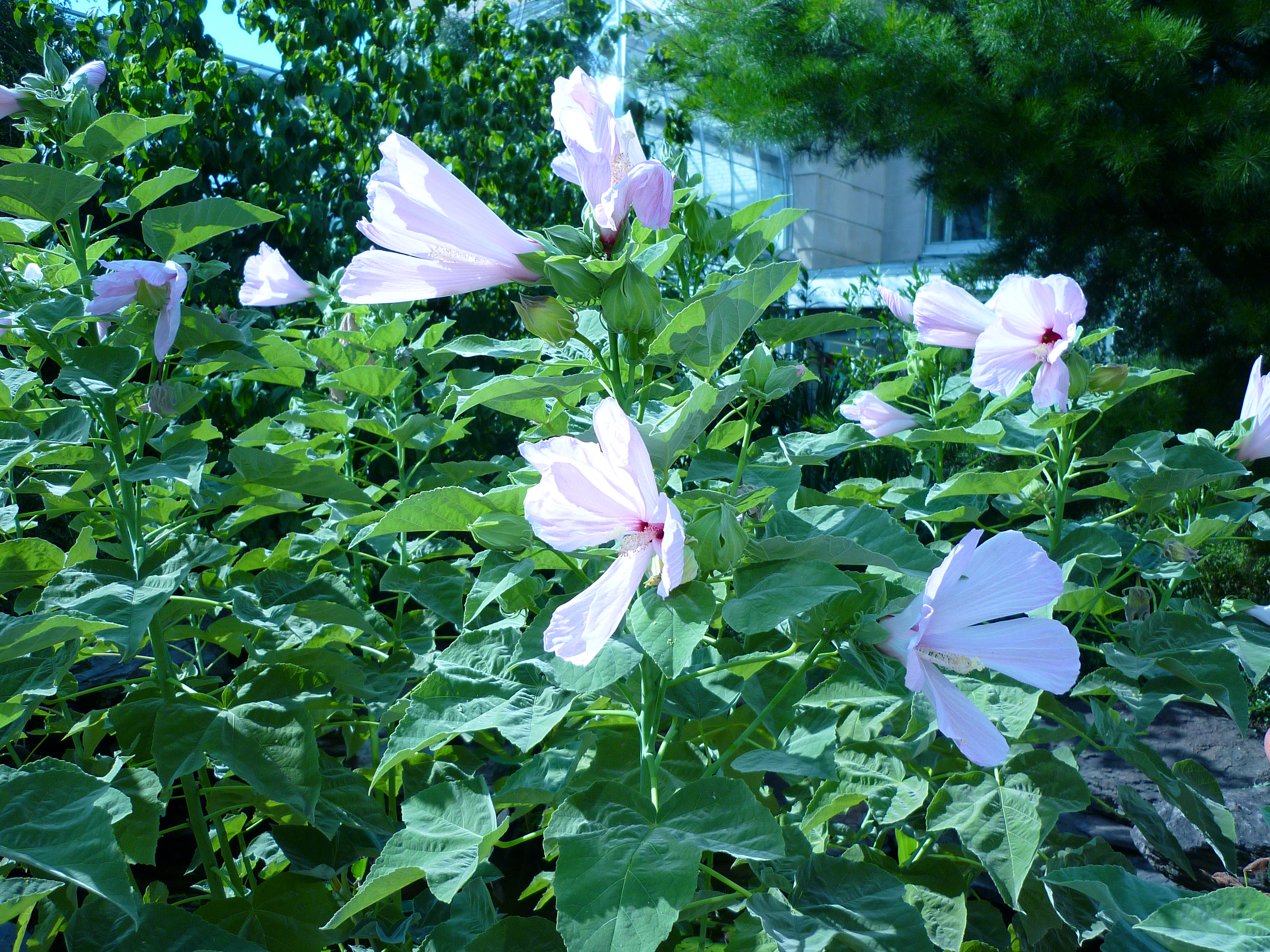

Scientific classification
- Kingdom: Plantae
- Clade: Tracheophytes
- Clade: Angiosperms
- Clade: Eudicots
- Clade: Rosids
- Order: Malvales
- Family: Malvaceae
- Genus: Hibiscus
- Species: H. grandiflorus

Binomial name
- Hibiscus grandiflorus Michx.

= Hibiscus grandiflorus =

Swamp rosemallow

Species of flowering plant in the mallow family

Hibiscus grandiflorus, the large-flowered hibiscus or swamp rosemallow, is a species of flowering plant in the mallow family, Malvaceae. It is native to the southern United States, from southeast Texas, to southern Florida as well as western Cuba. It is historically known from South Carolina. It favors wet habitats, especially tidal marshes, as well as lakeshores and wet pine savannas. Its flowers serve as a nectar source for hummingbirds, and its fruits provide seeds for other birds.

== Description ==
H. grandiflorus is a woody perennial which can reach 6 feet (1.8 m) on average. Extreme heights of 15 feet (4.6 m) are known. It has pink to white flowers with a reddish purple center and yellow stamens. Flowers are generally greater than 6 inches (15 cm) in diameter. Its capsules are covered in velvety trichomes.
