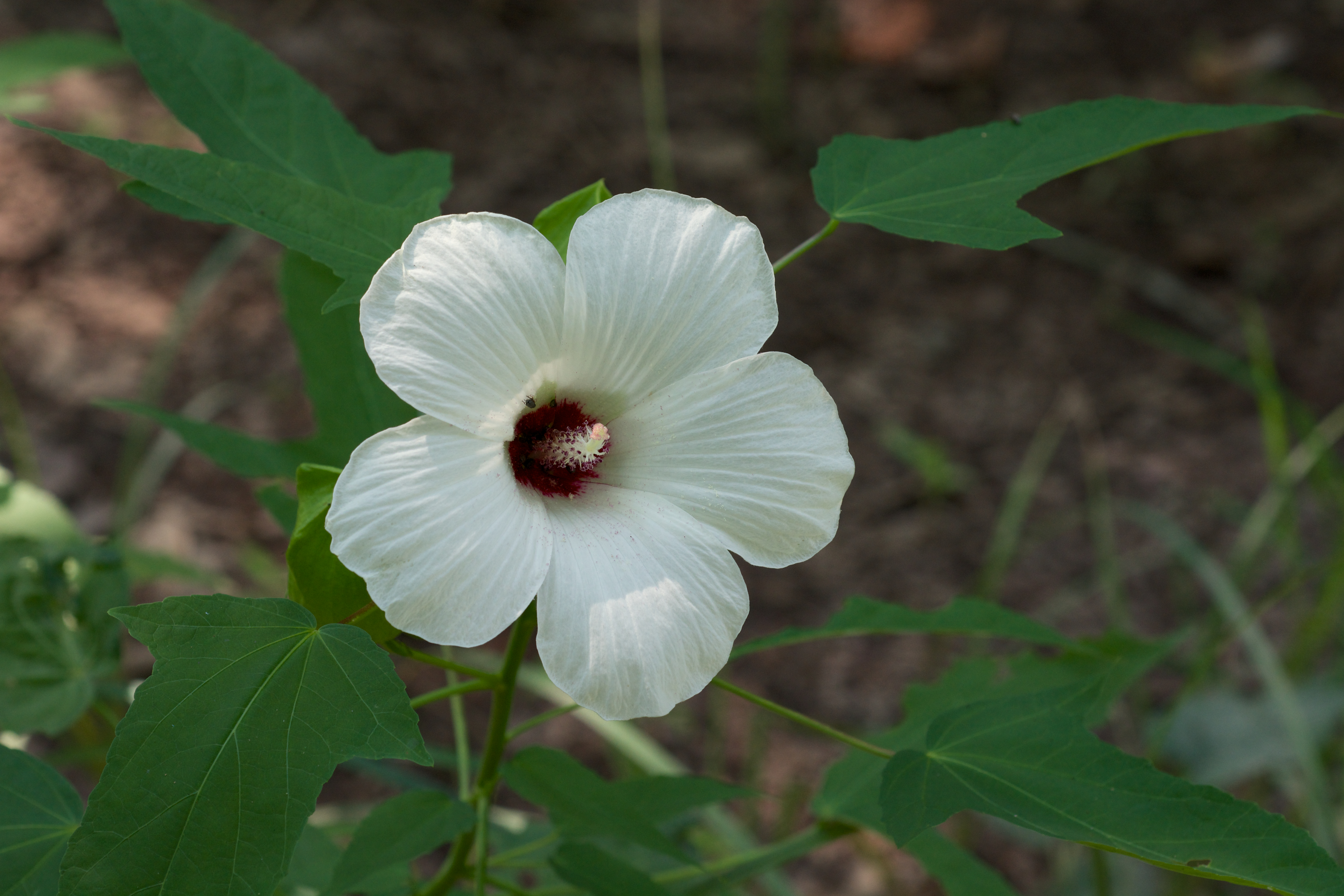

Conservation status
- Secure (NatureServe)

Scientific classification
- Kingdom: Plantae
- Clade: Tracheophytes
- Clade: Angiosperms
- Clade: Eudicots
- Clade: Rosids
- Order: Malvales
- Family: Malvaceae
- Genus: Hibiscus
- Species: H. laevis

Binomial name
- Hibiscus laevis All.

Synonyms
- H. militaris

= Hibiscus laevis =

Species of flowering plant

Hibiscus laevis (syn. Hibiscus militaris), the halberd-leaf rosemallow, is a herbaceous perennial flower native to central and eastern North America. Their showy, creamy-white or pink flowers are large, up to 15 centimetres (6 in) across, and are hard to miss. These flowers require exposure to sunlight to open up properly, and then last only a single day.

The unbranched stems of this plant are round and hairless, frequently growing to 2 metres (6 ft) tall and sometimes taller. The root system includes a taproot.

The hairless leaves are alternate, 8 to 15 centimetres (3 to 6 in) long, divided into 3–5 pointed lobes (cleft) and have serrate or crenate edges. They are simple and pointed at the tip. The leaves with three lobes resemble a medieval halberd because the middle lobe is much larger than the two side lobes. The five-lobed leaves also look like halberds or daggers.

Flowers are solitary or occur in small clusters at the tops of the upper stems. They are fairly large, about 13 centimetres (5 in) across when fully open. They are mostly white or light pink, but the inside throat of the flower is often maroon or a rich purplish pink color. Each flower has five petals with five hairless green sepals below. There are numerous stamens, all attached to a central column. The pistils have superior ovaries and five stigmas protruding from the central column in the flower. The fruit is an ovoid capsule containing many seeds.

The blooming period can occur from mid-summer to early fall (June to September) and lasts about a month. Each flower lasts only a single day. This plant spreads by reseeding itself. The stalks die down in the winter and grow back in the spring.

This plant prefers full or partial sun and moist conditions. It can grow in sand or clay with sufficient moisture, and can tolerate poor drainage. They are frequently found along streams, ponds and lakes and in marshy areas, roadside ditches, and sometimes in shallow standing water.

The seeds of this plant are eaten by waterfowl and bobwhite quail.

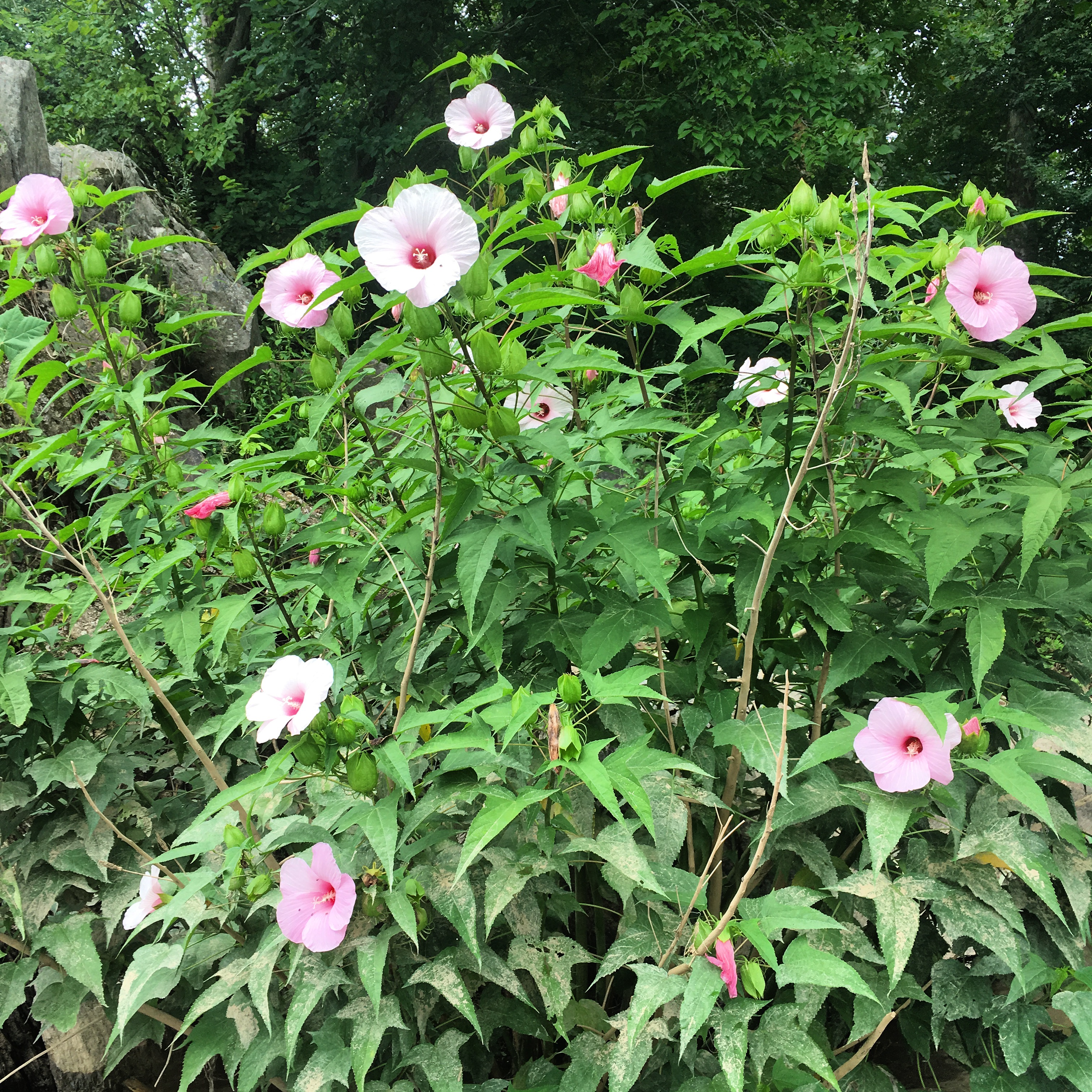
Hibiscus militaris on the Potomac River in Great Falls Park

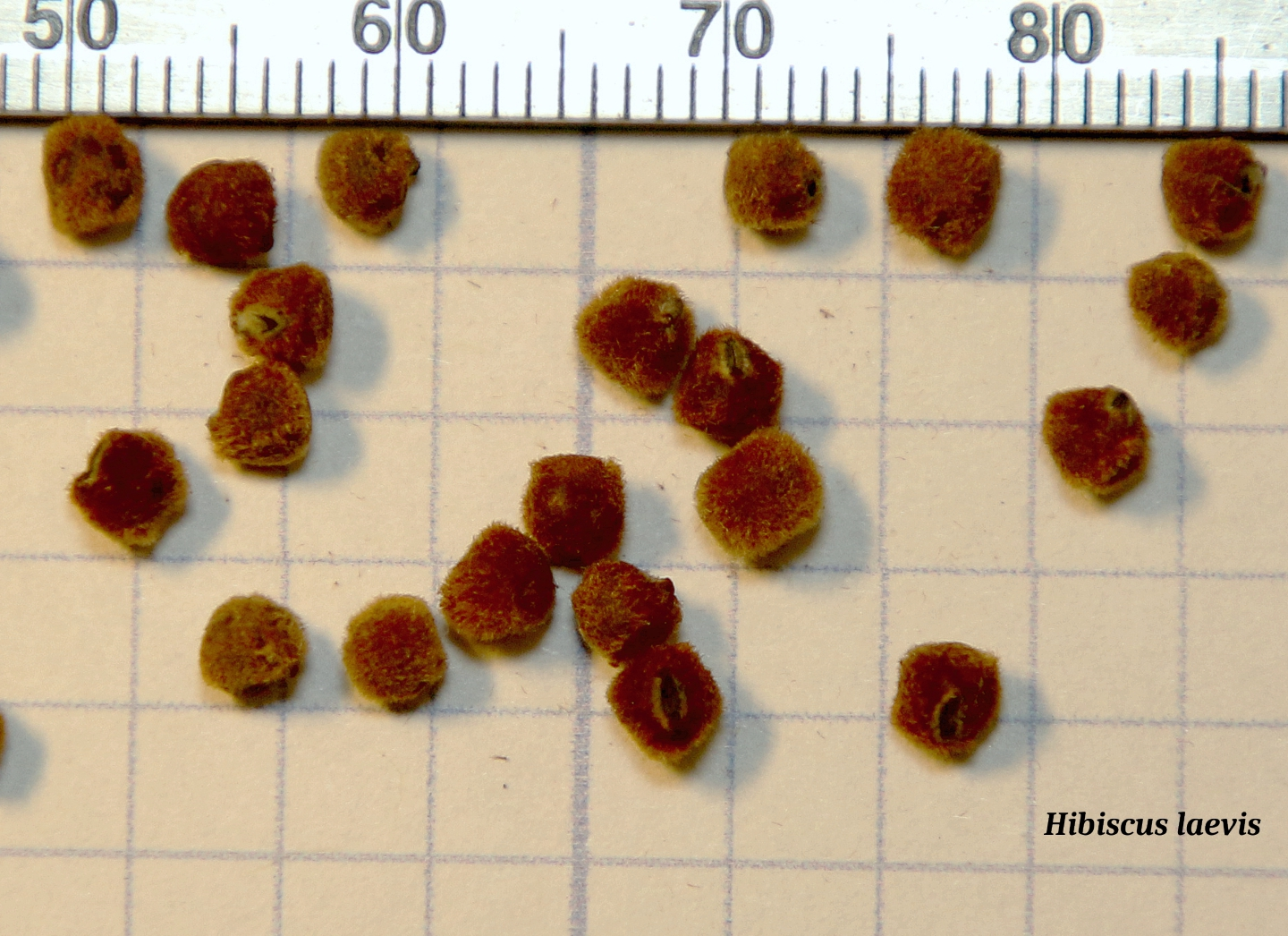
Hibiscus laevis seeds
