= Desert mallow =

Desert mallow is a common name for several plants and may refer to:

- Sphaeralcea ambigua
- Sphaeralcea fulva
- Sphaeralcea incana
- Sphaeralcea grossulariifolia, currant-leaf desert mallow
- Sphaeralcea munroana, Munro's desert-mallow
