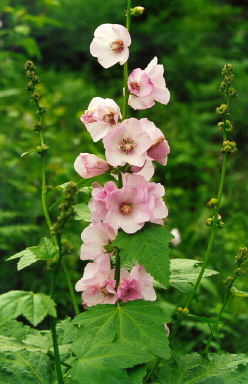
- Streambank wild hollyhock (I. rivularis)

Scientific classification
- Kingdom: Plantae
- Clade: Tracheophytes
- Clade: Angiosperms
- Clade: Eudicots
- Clade: Rosids
- Order: Malvales
- Family: Malvaceae
- Subfamily: Malvoideae
- Tribe: Malveae
- Genus: Iliamna; Greene

Species
- Several, see text

= Iliamna (plant) =

Genus of flowering plants

Iliamna is a small genus of flowering plants in the mallow family, endemic to North America. It is related to the bush mallows of California (Malacothamnus) and to Phymosia of Mexico, Central America and the Caribbean. These perennial herbs are known commonly as wild hollyhocks and sometimes as globe mallows, Kankakee mallow, Kankakee globe mallow, and Streambank wild hollyhock. More often, the latter terms refer to members of the genus Sphaeralcea, which belong, like Iliamna, to the "typical" mallow tribe (Malveae) of the mallow and hibiscus subfamily Malvoideae. The name of the genus, proposed by Edward Lee Greene, appears to be a reference to Iliamna Lake in Alaska, even though the genus Iliamna does not occur in Alaska

The plants are herbaceous with a racemose inflorescence consisting of showy, slightly fragrant flowers ranging in color from almost white to lavender. The leaves are alternate and shallowly palmately lobed and stems and leaves are coarsely pubescent. The sepals of I. remota plants are broadly lanceolate and longer than wide compared to the broadly triangular ovate sepals that were equally broad and long on I. rivularis plants.

Iliamna remota was first reported by the Reverend E. J. Hill on June 29, 1872, on Langham Island in the Kankakee River of northern Illinois. Reverend Hill noted that the plants grew in habitats he called "gravelly island" and "dry banks". Iliamna remota was designated as endangered by the Illinois Endangered Species Protection Board in 1980. Historical surveys and management recovery plans for I. remota and its vegetation on Langham Island have been reviewed. The island has remained undisturbed since 1945 after farming ceased on that island. In 1966, the island then was dedicated as an Illinois Nature Preserve with the primary purpose to preserve the native Iliamna remota population.

== Species ==
Eight species are accepted.

- Iliamna angulata Greene
- Iliamna bakeri (Jeps.) Wiggins – Baker's wild hollyhock, Baker's globe-mallow
- Iliamna corei (Sherff) Sherff – Peter's Mountain mallow
- Iliamna crandallii (Rydb.) Wiggins
- Iliamna latibracteata Wiggins – California wild hollyhock, California globe-mallow
- Iliamna longisepala Wiggins
- Iliamna remota Greene – Kankakee mallow
- Iliamna rivularis (Douglas) Greene – Streambank wild hollyhock
