= Iliamna crandallii =

- Herbarium specimen, collected 1903, near Fish Creek Falls

Conservation status
- Imperiled (NatureServe)

Scientific classification
- Kingdom: Plantae
- Clade: Tracheophytes
- Clade: Angiosperms
- Clade: Eudicots
- Clade: Rosids
- Order: Malvales
- Family: Malvaceae
- Genus: Iliamna
- Species: I. crandallii

Binomial name
- Iliamna crandallii (Rydb.) Wiggins

Synonyms
- Phymosia crandallii; Sphaeralcea crandallii

Plant species in the veronica family

Iliamna crandallii, also known as Crandall's wild hollyhock, is a rare plant of the mallow family that only grows in northwestern Colorado.

== Description ==
Crandall's wild hollyhock is a herbaceous perennial plant that grows stems that are 50 to 70 centimeters (20–28 in) tall. The stems are hairless to sparely hairy, with hairs that are faintly star shaped on close examination.

The leaves are 5–10 centimeters (2–4 in) wide with five to seven deeply divided lobes and a base like the top of a heart to squared off. The lobes are narrow triangular shaped with the central lobe two to three times longer than the ones to the sides and edges that are serrate with large backwards pointing teeth.

The flowers are somewhat white to somewhat pink with petals that are 2–2.5 cm (0.8–1.0 in) long and bloom in July or August. The petals are fringed with hairs about one-third the way up the petal. The sepals are unified at the base and about 1–1.5 cm long from base to end, with lobes of 0.9–1.2 cm and a long tapering tip. The inside of the sepals are covered in small hairs. Each flower is by itself in the leaf axils towards the ends of the stems. There is a whorl of small bractlets under the flower, each 8–10 millimeters long and just 1 mm wide, with a shape like a grass blade.

Each section of the dry fruit contains two to four hairless seeds.

In comparison to the streambank wild hollyhock (Iliamna rivularis) it has much wider set of sepals, the streambank species usually just 5–8 millimeters long, only rarely reaching 1.1 cm. The long-sepal wild hollyhock (Iliamna longisepala) has similar length sepals, but is a much larger plant at 1–2 meters (3 ft 3 in – 6 ft 7 in) tall and also has much hairier stems.

== Taxonomy ==
Iliamna crandallii was first described by Per Axel Rydberg as Sphaeralcea crandallii in 1904. He then moved it to Phymosia in 1913, but the accepted name was created in 1936 when Ira Loren Wiggins placed it in Iliamna. Along with the rest of the genus it is part of the Malvaceae family. It is listed as accepted in by Plants of the World Online, the Flora of North America, and by the USDA Natural Resources Conservation Service. At times the species has not been recognized such as by Jennifer Ackerfield in her 2015 Flora of Colorado where it was considered a synonym of Iliamna rivularis, though in the 2022 second edition it was listed as a species.

=== Names ===
Rydberg described the species from material collected by Charles Spencer Crandall near Steamboat Springs, on 14 July 1894. Iliamna crandallii is known by the common names Crandall's wild hollyhock, Crandall's hollyhock, or Crandall's globe mallow.

== Range and habitat ==
Crandall's wild hollyhock is endemic to Colorado, with the species only recorded in four counties, Routt, Garfield, Moffat, and Rio Blanco. There are seven documented populations, but only two of them have been documented in 20 years as of 2024. Only 69 plants were found in the two recently documented populations.

It grows in open forests, along stream banks, and on mountain slopes, but has also sometimes been found alongside roads in rocky soil and on sagebrush slopes.

=== Conservation ===
Iliamna crandallii was evaluated by NatureServe in 2025 and rated imperiled at the global and state level (G2, S2). Potential threats to the species are not well studied, but climate change, environmental changes due to invasive species, and road maintenance operations could reduce population numbers.
