= Stenopodius texanus =

Scientific classification
- Kingdom: Animalia
- Phylum: Arthropoda
- Class: Insecta
- Order: Coleoptera
- Suborder: Polyphaga
- Infraorder: Cucujiformia
- Family: Chrysomelidae
- Genus: Stenopodius
- Species: S. texanus

Binomial name
- Stenopodius texanus Schaeffer, 1933

Species of beetle

Stenopodius texanus is a species of leaf beetle in the family Chrysomelidae. It is found in North America, where it has been recorded from Canada (Alberta, Saskatchewan) and the United States (Arizona, California, New Mexico, Texas).

== Biology ==
The food plant is unknown, but adults have been collected on Sphaeralcea species (including Sphaeralcea coccinea, Sphaeralcea emoryi and Sphaeralcea lindheimeri), as well as Abutilon species.
