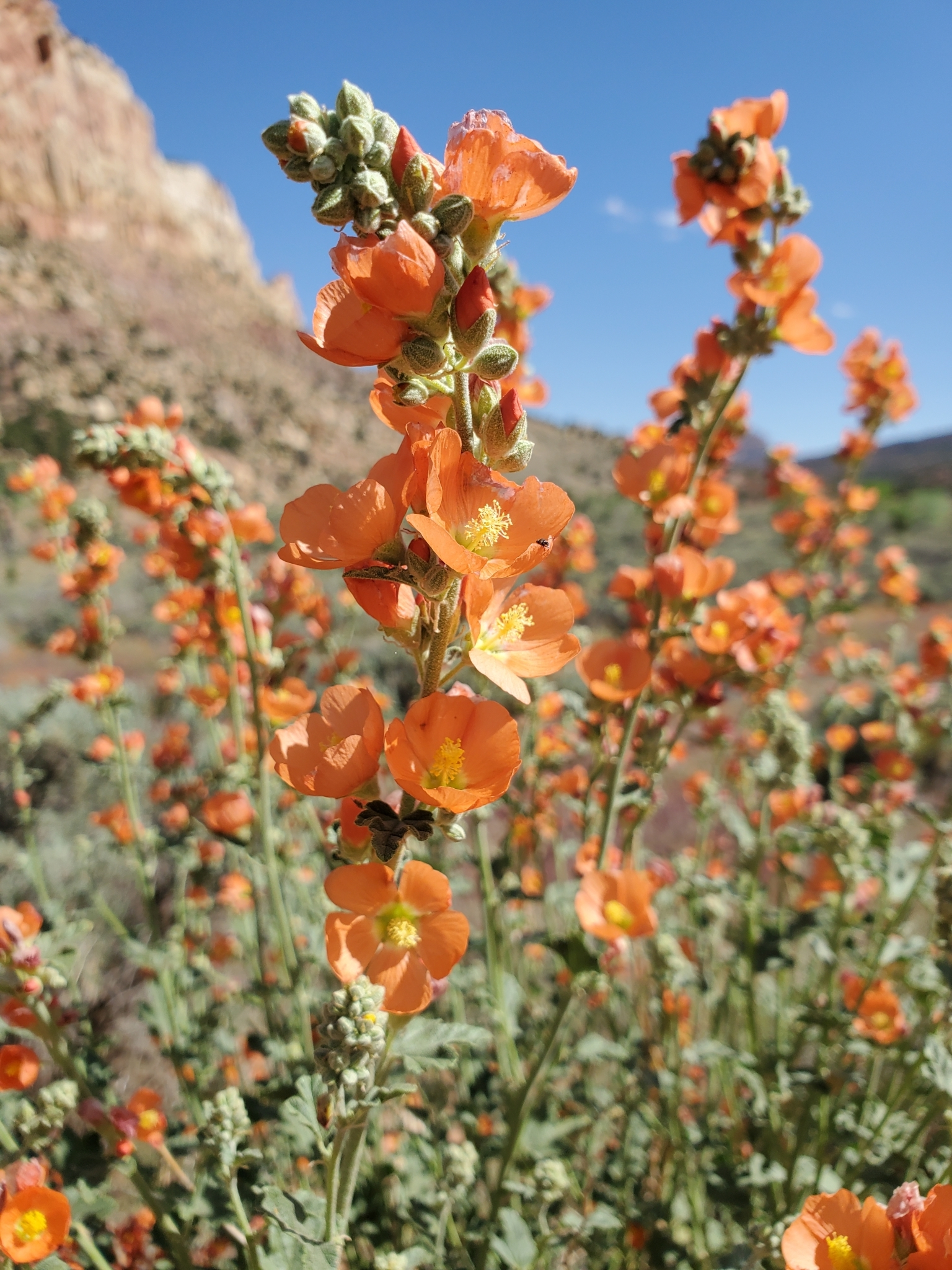
- Sphaeralcea parvifolia flowers photographed in Capitol Reef National Park

Conservation status
- Secure (NatureServe)

Scientific classification
- Kingdom: Plantae
- Clade: Tracheophytes
- Clade: Angiosperms
- Clade: Eudicots
- Clade: Rosids
- Order: Malvales
- Family: Malvaceae
- Genus: Sphaeralcea
- Species: S. parvifolia

Binomial name
- Sphaeralcea parvifolia A.Nelson

Synonyms
- Sphaeralcea arizonica A.Heller ex Rydb. (1913); Sphaeralcea marginata York ex Rydb. (1906)

= Sphaeralcea parvifolia =

Plant species in the mallow family

Sphaeralcea parvifolia, commonly called small-leaved globe-mallow or small-leaf globemallow, is a species of plant native to the western United States in the Great Basin and Colorado River drainage. It is medium sized herbaceous species that has showy orange flower spikes. It is used in wildflower and dry gardens.

== Description ==
Sphaeralcea parvifolia is a perennial plant with stems that grow straight upwards to as much as 1 meter (3.3 ft), but more often grows to between 15 and 40 centimeters (6 and 16 in). The stems sprout from an underground branched, slightly woody structure called a caudex. The surface of the stems are covered in short, fine white to yellow hairs.

The leaves of Sphaeralcea parvifolia are egg shaped (ovate) with the widest part between the midpoint and base, but may also be nearly circular in outline, kidney shaped, or a shape halfway between a heart-shaped leaf and an egg shaped one. Leaves may have smooth edges or have three to five shallow lobes. They are gray to green in color and range in size from 1 to 5.5 centimeters long and 1.2 to 5.2 cm wide. The leaves emerge in the spring and die back in summer to conserve water and do not do much stem photosynthesis.

=== Flowers ===
Though each flower is not very large the clusters are quite noticeable. The inflorescence is a crowded and narrow panicle, it has determinate growth on the branches of the flowering stem making it a thyrse. Usually there is more than one flower at each node on the stem. The tip of the flowering stem is not leafy.

The flowers are most often orange or salmon colored, but may, very occasionally, be white or somewhat pink. The five petals measure just 7-15 millimeters long. The stamens are numerous making a fuzzy center to the flower and forming a sheath around the style.

The fruits are fused into an aggregate of 12 carpels into a wheel shape called a schizocarp. The schizocarp will break into three or four pieces. Each of the carpels will contain one gray or black seed and is formally called a mericarp.

Sphaeralcea parvifolia is very similar to Sphaeralcea incana, Sphaeralcea munroana, and Sphaeralcea hastulata. The range of Sphaeralcea munroana overlaps with it in Nevada and Utah, but it has coarsely toothed leaf edges and stems that are more gray to green where Sphaeralcea parvifolia has more yellow to white short hairs on its stems. Sphaeralcea hastulata grows to the south, overlapping with its range in Arizona and New Mexico.

== Taxonomy ==
Sphaeralcea parvifolia was scientifically described and named by Aven Nelson in 1904. It is classified in the globemallow genus Sphaeralcea and the mallow family, Malvaceae.

=== Names ===
The species name parvifolia can be translated from botanical Latin as "small-leaved". Likewise it is known by the English common name small-leaved globe-mallow or small-leaf globemallow. Similarly it is sometimes named the littleleaf globemallow. Like other members of its genus is also simply called globe-mallow.

== Range and habitat ==
Sphaeralcea parvifolia grows in much of the Four Corners region of the United States west to the Sierra Nevada. They grow throughout the state of Nevada, most of Utah and Arizona, and the western portions of Colorado and New Mexico. They also are found in Idaho, but listed as an introduced species in that state by Plants of the World Online. It grows in especially large numbers in north-central and northern Arizona.

It grows in amid salt desert shrub, blackbrush, sagebrush, and pinyon–juniper woodlands. In addition it frequently grows alongside roads. It grows at elevations of 1500 to 2100 meters.

== Ecology ==
Small-leaf globemallow is a host for the caterpillars of the common checkered-skipper along with many other plants in the mallow family.

== Cultivation ==
Small-leaf globemallow is used in xeriscape gardening and as a naturalizing plant. It prefers productive soils rather than a barren soils. It is winter hardy in USDA zones 5–10.
