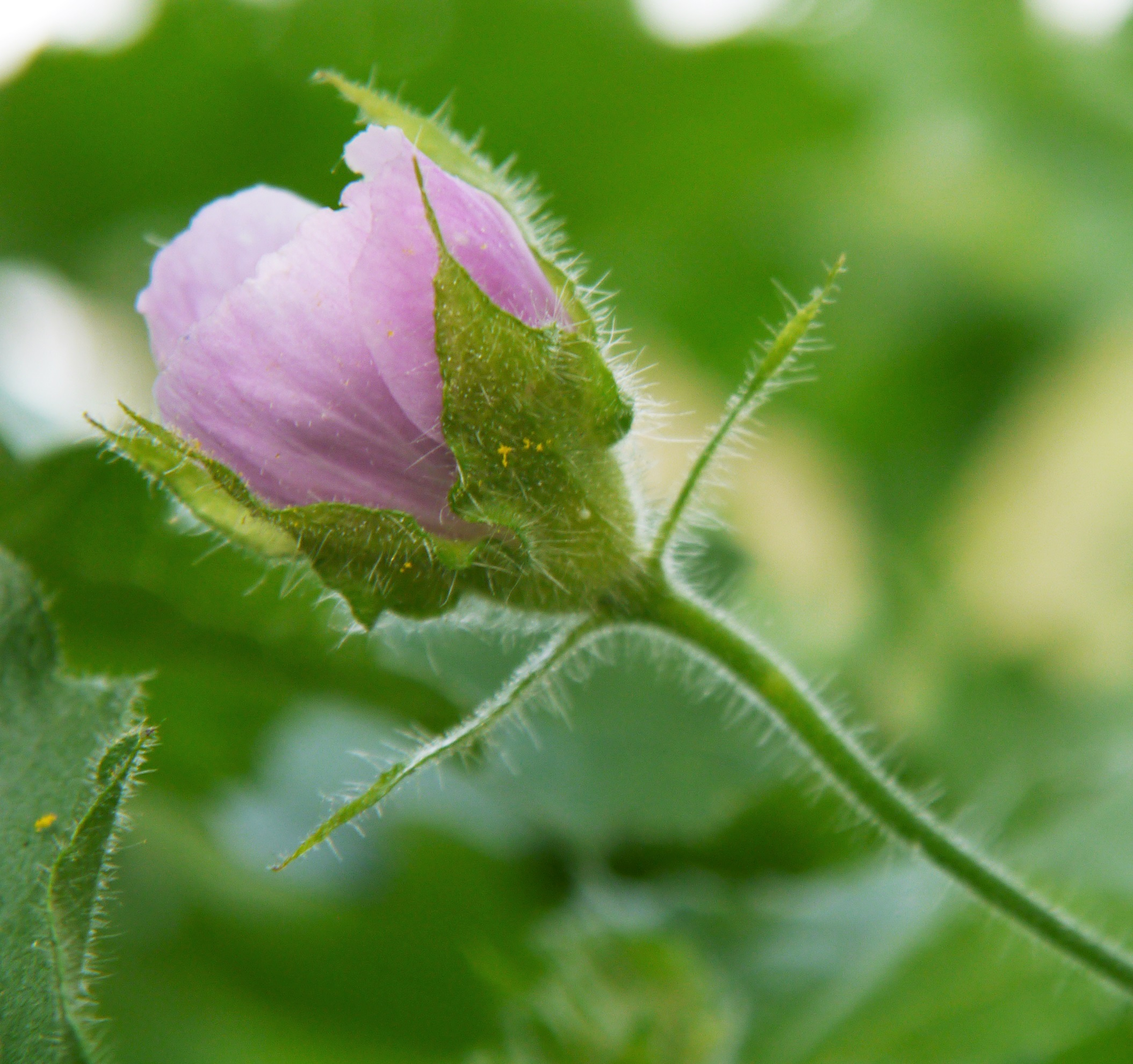

Conservation status
- Vulnerable (NatureServe)

Scientific classification
- Kingdom: Plantae
- Clade: Tracheophytes
- Clade: Angiosperms
- Clade: Eudicots
- Clade: Rosids
- Order: Malvales
- Family: Malvaceae
- Genus: Iliamna
- Species: I. longisepala

Binomial name
- Iliamna longisepala (Torr.) Wiggins

Synonyms
- Phymosia longisepala (Torr.) Rydb.; Sphaeralcea longisepala Torr.

= Iliamna longisepala =

Plant species in the mallow family

Iliamna longisepala, known by the common name long sepal globemallow, is a perennial plant species in the mallow family.

== Description ==
Long haired perennial plant with 5-9 lobed leaves. Flowers in racemes that are pink to lavender. The slightly longer sepal length distinguishes this species from similar looking species like the more common Iliamna rivularis and are around 1.5 cm long.

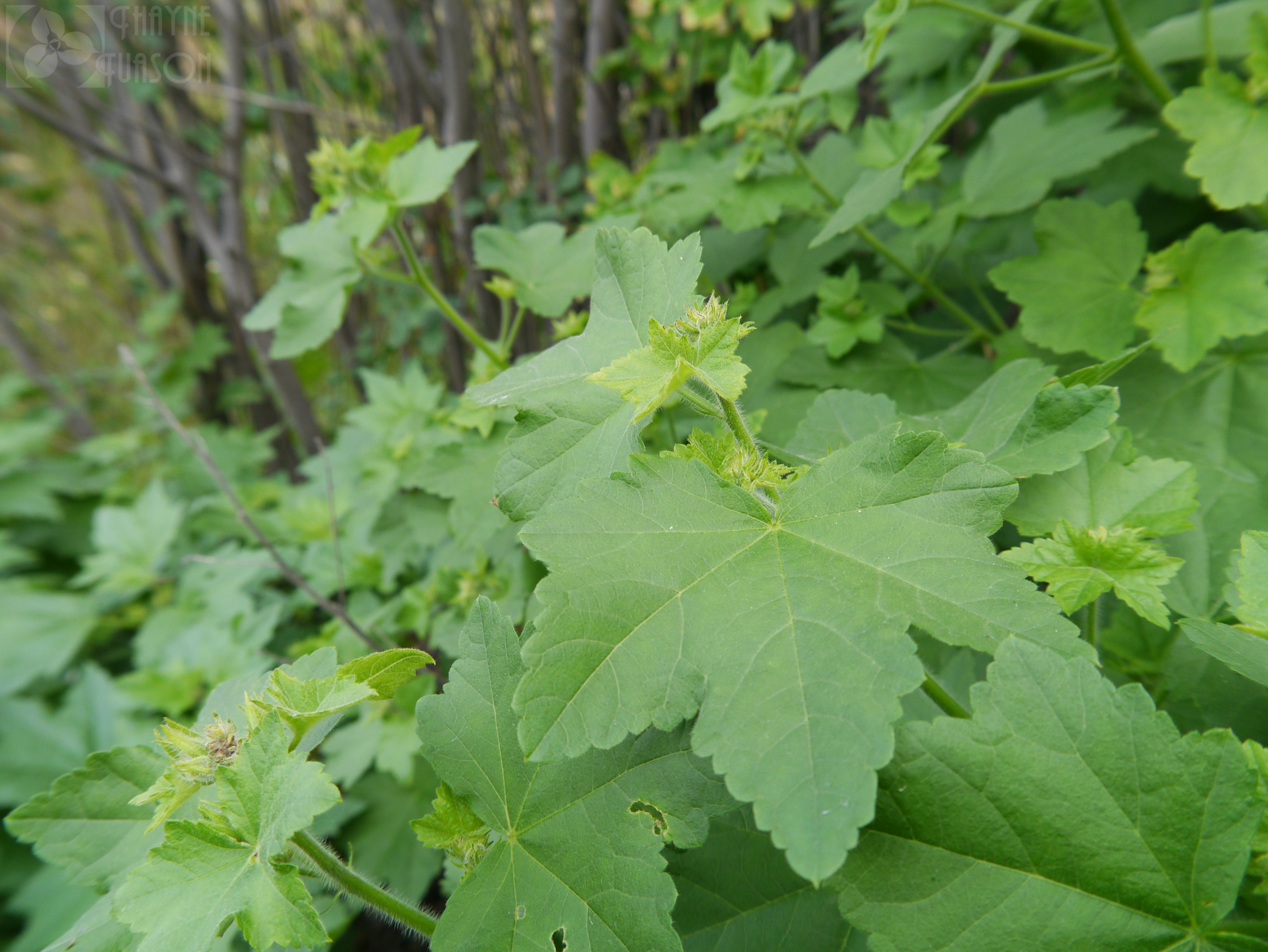
Iliamna longisepala leaves and flower buds

== Taxonomy ==
Iliamna longisepala was initially described by John Torrey as a species in the Sphaeralcea genus named Sphaeralcea longisepala in 1874. It was moved to Phymosia in 1913 by Per Axel Rydberg, but was given its accepted name when Ira Loren Wiggins placed it in Iliamna in 1936. Along with the rest of its genus it is part of the Malvaceae family and the species has no varieties.

It is known by the common names long-sepal globemallow and long-sepal wild hollyhock.

== Distribution ==
This plant grows at lower elevations from sagebrush desert to Ponderosa pine forests east of the Cascade crest in Washington State, primarily in Chelan and Douglas counties.
