= S. incana =

S. incana may refer to:

- Scutellaria incana, the downy skullcap, a flowering plant species native to North America
- Senra incana, a flowering plant species
- Sphaeralcea incana, the grey globemallow, a perennial desert plant species found in Southwestern United States

== See also ==
- Incana (disambiguation)
