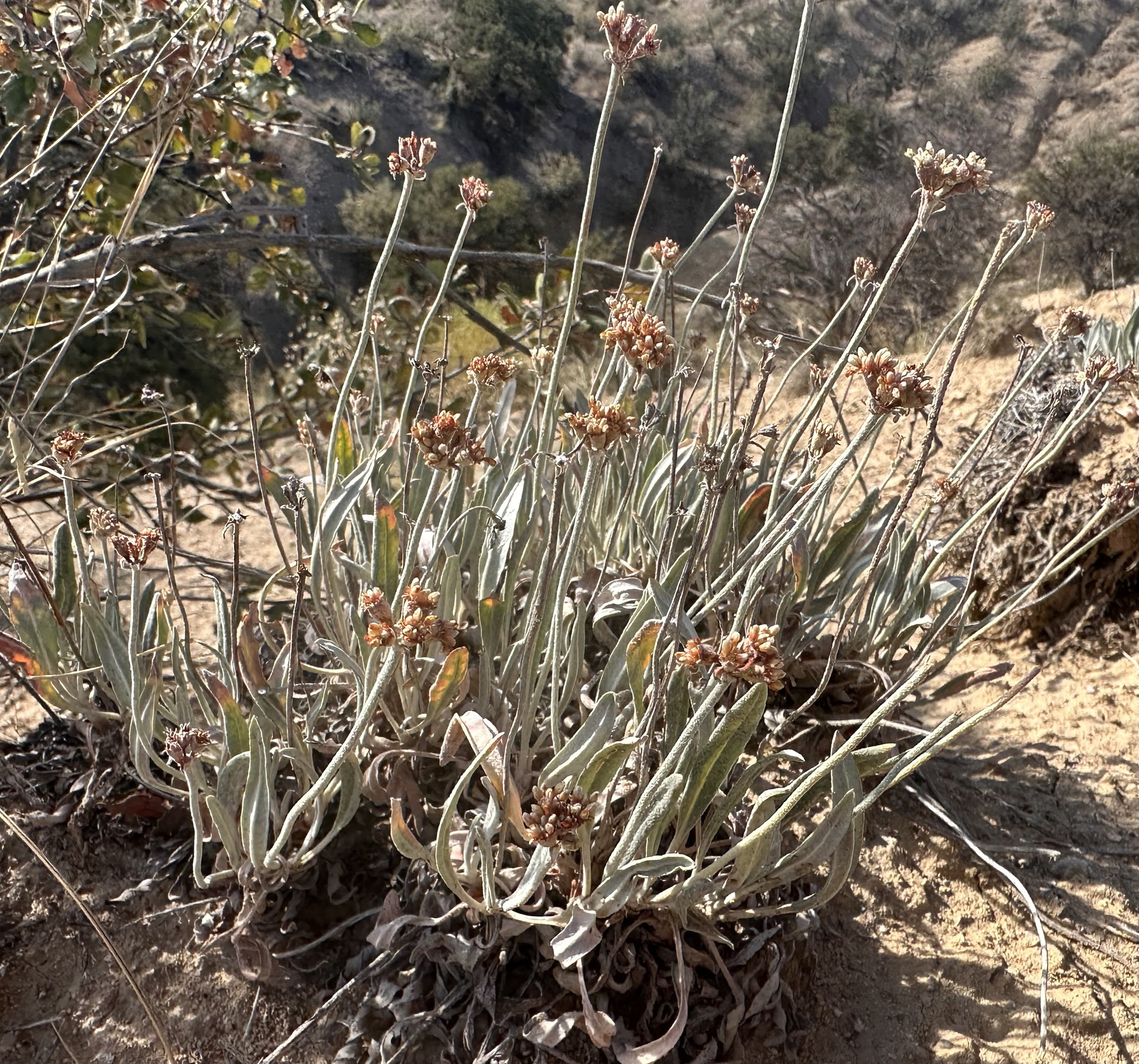
- Blooming in Chaffee County, Colorado

Conservation status
- Imperiled (NatureServe)

Scientific classification
- Kingdom: Plantae
- Clade: Embryophytes
- Clade: Tracheophytes
- Clade: Angiosperms
- Clade: Eudicots
- Order: Caryophyllales
- Family: Polygonaceae
- Genus: Eriogonum
- Species: E. brandegeei

Binomial name
- Eriogonum brandegeei Rydb.

Synonyms
- Eriogonum spathulatum var. brandegeei

= Eriogonum brandegeei =

Species of wild buckwheat

Eriogonum brandegeei (sometimes spelled brandegei) is a species of flowering plant in the buckwheat family known by the common name Brandegee's buckwheat. It is endemic to Colorado in the United States, where it occurs in Fremont and Chaffee Counties.

== Description ==
This plant grows up to about 25 centimeters tall and has grayish woolly herbage. Flowering stems arise from a matted base. All the leaves are located around the base of the plant. They are lance-shaped to somewhat oval and measure up to 4 or 5 centimeters long. The inflorescence atop each aerial stem is 1 to 1.5 centimeters wide and is a cluster of tiny yellowish white or pink flowers. Flowering occurs in July through October. The plant turns purple during the winter.

== Taxonomy ==
Eriogonum brandegeei was scientifically described and named by Per Axel Rydberg in 1917. Susan Gabriella Stokes proposed reclassifying it as a variety of Eriogonum spathulatum in 1936, but this did not become accepted. It is part of the Eriogonum genus within the Polygonaceae family.

== Distribution and habitat ==
This plant grows in soils that are high in bentonite. Bentonite soils can host few types of plants, so the landscape is often sparsely vegetated. This species can be found on substrates belonging to or derived from the Dry Union Formation and Morrison Formation, two local geological formations. It can grow on flat ground or steep slopes. The habitat in the area is mainly pinyon-juniper woodland. It can also be found in shrublands within a matrix of plant communities. Associated plants include Atriplex canescens, Opuntia imbricata, Bouteloua gracilis, Oryzopsis hymenoides, Aristida fendleriana, Sphaeralcea coccinea, Cleome serrulata, Melilotus alba, Salsola iberica, Kochia iranica, Melilotus officinalis, and Bouteloua curtipendula.

== Conservation ==
The worst threat to the species is recreational activity. All occurrences of the plant are affected by off-road vehicle use. The plant grows on slopes that are mostly free of vegetation, terrain that is attractive to off-road vehicle users. Horseback riding may also threaten some occurrences. An increasing threat is residential development, which is encroaching on the area. Fremont County's population grew 43% between 1990 and 2000, making it one of the most rapidly growing counties in the US. Chaffee County also has fast growth at this time. Habitat for this plant has been lost to residential growth.

Bentonite mining is a potential threat, but not a current one. Fossil excavation is a very low-level threat to some occurrences. Livestock grazing is a threat, but an indirect one, as it tends to increase erosion of the substrate. Despite threats and limited available habitat, the species appears to be stable.
