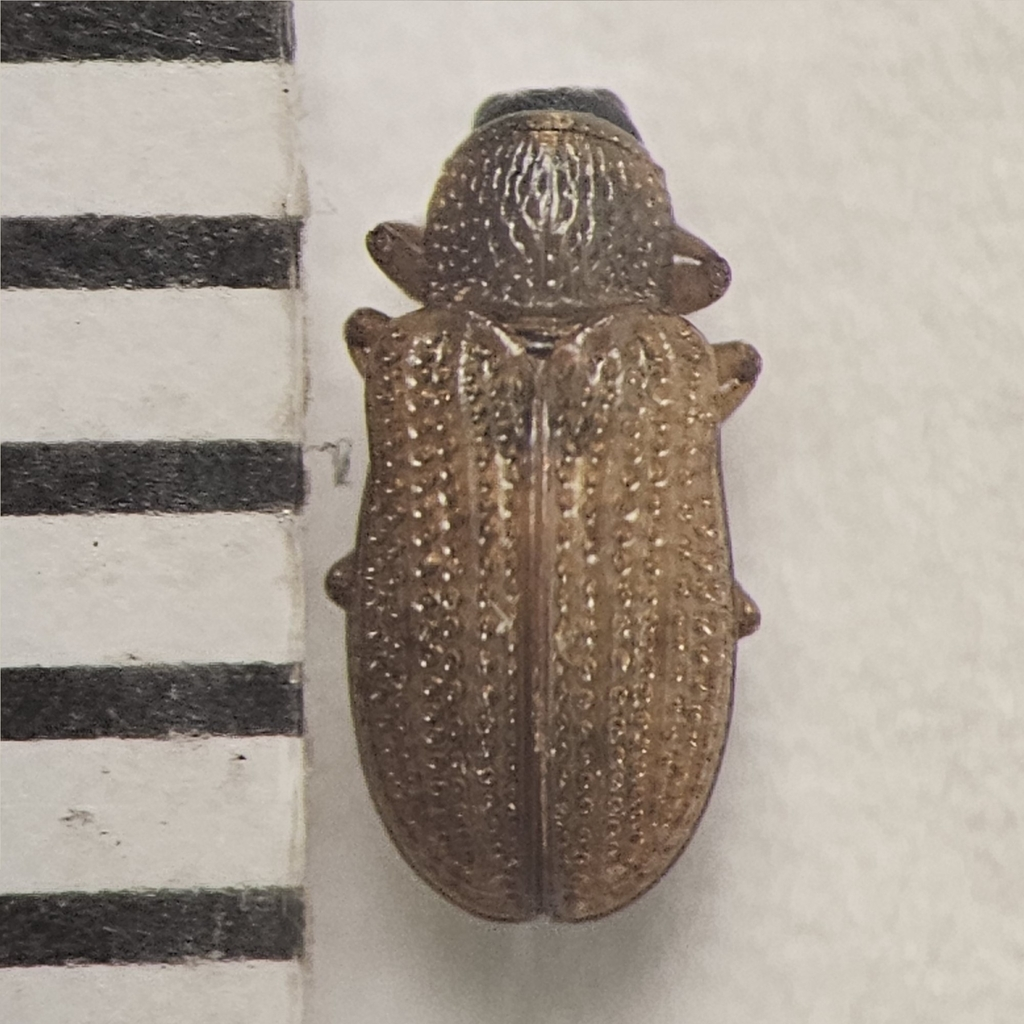

Scientific classification
- Kingdom: Animalia
- Phylum: Arthropoda
- Class: Insecta
- Order: Coleoptera
- Suborder: Polyphaga
- Infraorder: Cucujiformia
- Family: Chrysomelidae
- Genus: Stenopodius
- Species: S. lateralis

Binomial name
- Stenopodius lateralis (Schaeffer, 1933)

Synonyms
- Brachycoryna lateralis Schaeffer, 1933; Stenopodius vanduzeei Blaisdell, 1939

= Stenopodius lateralis =

Species of beetle

Stenopodius lateralis is a species of leaf beetle in the family Chrysomelidae. It is found in Central America and North America, where it has been recorded from Canada (Alberta, Saskatchewan), the United States (Arizona, California, Colorado, Idaho, Minnesota, South Dakota, Wyoming) and Mexico (Baja California).

== Biology ==
The food plant is unknown, but adults have been collected on Sphaeralcea ambigua, Sphaeralcea emoryi and Sphaeralcea orcuttii.
