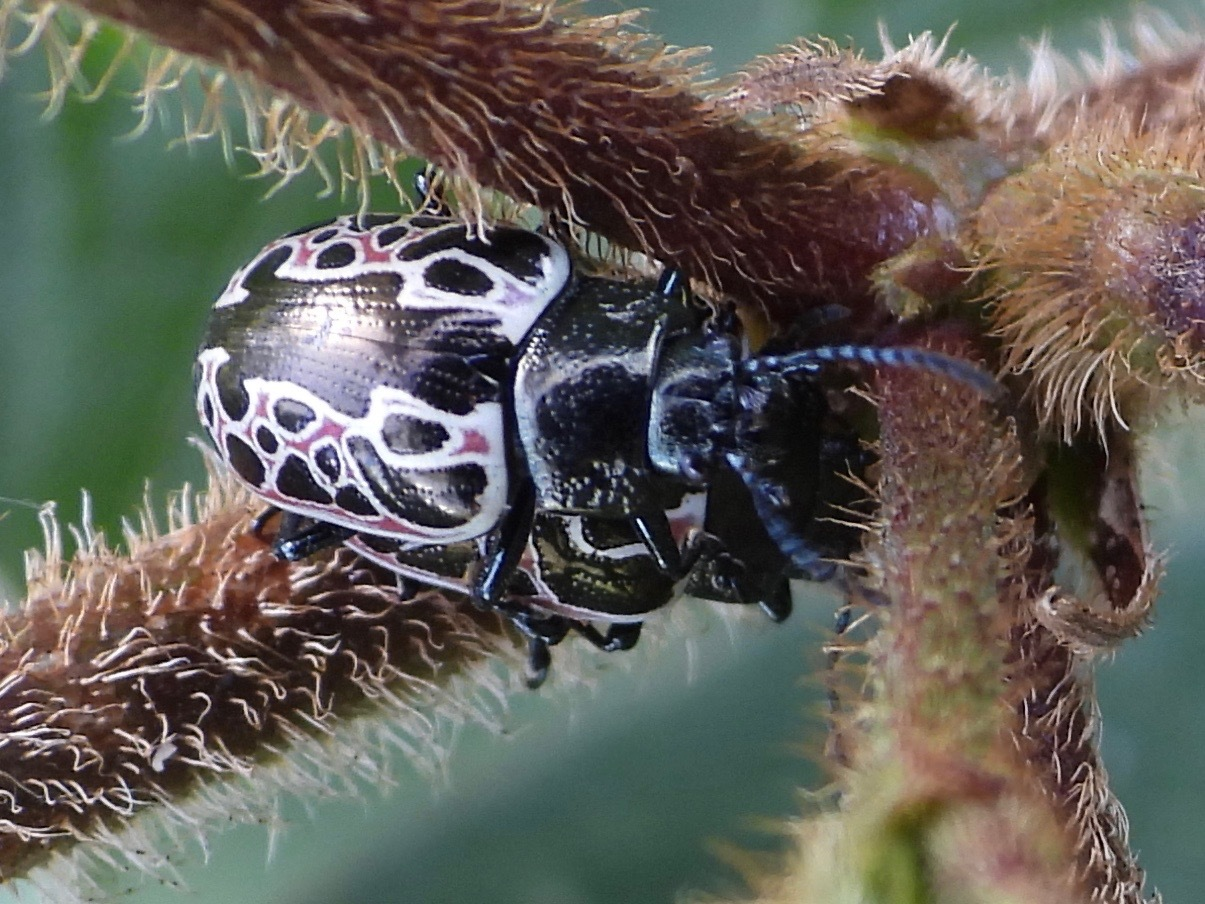

Scientific classification
- Kingdom: Animalia
- Phylum: Arthropoda
- Clade: Pancrustacea
- Class: Insecta
- Order: Coleoptera
- Suborder: Polyphaga
- Infraorder: Cucujiformia
- Family: Chrysomelidae
- Genus: Calligrapha
- Species: C. diversa

Binomial name
- Calligrapha diversa (Stål, 1859)

= Calligrapha diversa =

Species of beetle

Calligrapha diversa is a species of leaf beetle in the family Chrysomelidae. It was first described by Carl Stål in 1859. It is found across Central America and North America. It feeds on plants in the family Malvaceae, such as Malva parviflora and Sphaeralcae angustifolia, and Solanaceae like Solanum nigrescens.
