= Stenopodius insularis =

Scientific classification
- Kingdom: Animalia
- Phylum: Arthropoda
- Class: Insecta
- Order: Coleoptera
- Suborder: Polyphaga
- Infraorder: Cucujiformia
- Family: Chrysomelidae
- Genus: Stenopodius
- Species: S. insularis

Binomial name
- Stenopodius insularis Blaisdell, 1939

Species of beetle

Stenopodius insularis is a species of beetle of the family Chrysomelidae. It is found in the United States (Arizona, California, Nevada, Utah) and Mexico (Baja California).

== Biology ==
The food plant is unknown, but adults have been collected on Hibiscus denudatus and Sphaeralcea species.
