= Iliamna latibracteata =

Scientific classification
- Kingdom: Plantae
- Clade: Tracheophytes
- Clade: Angiosperms
- Clade: Eudicots
- Clade: Rosids
- Order: Malvales
- Family: Malvaceae
- Genus: Iliamna
- Species: I. latibracteata

Binomial name
- Iliamna latibracteata Wiggins

Species of flowering plant

Iliamna latibracteata is an uncommon species of flowering plant in the mallow family known by the common names California globe mallow and California wild hollyhock.

It is endemic to the coniferous forests of the Klamath Mountains, in northwestern California and southwestern Oregon

== Description ==
Iliamna latibracteata is a large perennial herb growing a hairy stem from a woody caudex to heights between one and two meters.

It produces palmate leaves with generally 5 or 7 pointed lobes on long, slender petioles, each leaf up to 20 centimeters long.

Flowers grow in the leaf axils, singly or in small clusters. Each flower is cup-shaped with five pink-lavender petals 2 to 3 centimeters long.
