= Stenopodius inyoensis =

Scientific classification
- Kingdom: Animalia
- Phylum: Arthropoda
- Class: Insecta
- Order: Coleoptera
- Suborder: Polyphaga
- Infraorder: Cucujiformia
- Family: Chrysomelidae
- Genus: Stenopodius
- Species: S. inyoensis

Binomial name
- Stenopodius inyoensis Blaisdell, 1939

Synonyms
- Stenopodius inyoensis pallidus Blaisdell, 1939

Species of beetle

Stenopodius inyoensis is a species of beetle of the family Chrysomelidae. It is found in the United States (California, Wyoming).

== Biology ==
The food plant is unknown.
