= Stenopodius submaculatus =

Scientific classification
- Kingdom: Animalia
- Phylum: Arthropoda
- Class: Insecta
- Order: Coleoptera
- Suborder: Polyphaga
- Infraorder: Cucujiformia
- Family: Chrysomelidae
- Genus: Stenopodius
- Species: S. submaculatus

Binomial name
- Stenopodius submaculatus Blaisdell, 1939

Synonyms
- Stenopodius submaculatus pallidulus Blaisdell, 1939; Stenopodius submaculatus laticollis Blaisdell, 1939

Species of beetle

Stenopodius submaculatus is a species of beetle of the family Chrysomelidae. It is found in the United States (Arizona, California).

== Biology ==
The food plant is unknown, but adults have been collected on Malacothamus fremontii and Malvastrum species.
