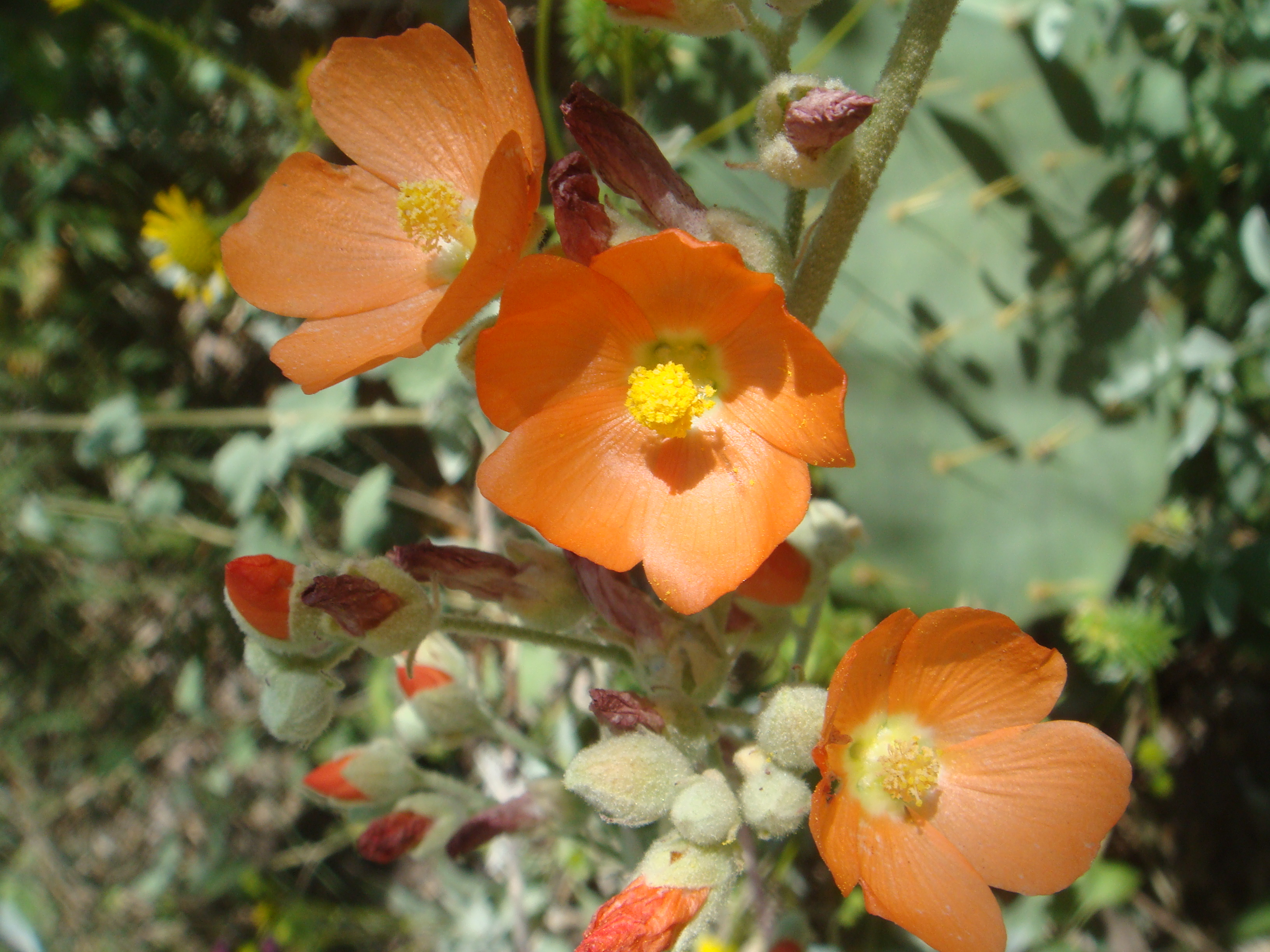

Scientific classification
- Kingdom: Plantae
- Clade: Tracheophytes
- Clade: Angiosperms
- Clade: Eudicots
- Clade: Rosids
- Order: Malvales
- Family: Malvaceae
- Genus: Sphaeralcea
- Species: S. coulteri

Binomial name
- Sphaeralcea coulteri (S.Watson) A.Gray

= Sphaeralcea coulteri =

Species of flowering plant

Sphaeralcea coulteri is a species of flowering plant in the mallow family known by the common name Coulter's globemallow. It is native to the Sonoran Desert, its distribution extending from northern Mexico north into California and Arizona. It is an annual herb, its slender, hairy stems sprawling or growing erect to a maximum height near 1.5 meters. The thin, gray-green leaf blades are wide and short, heart-shaped or triangular in shape, and measure up to about 5 centimeters long. They have a few wide lobes along the edges which may have teeth or smaller lobes. The leafy inflorescence bears clusters of flowers each with five wedge-shaped orange petals around a centimeter long, and yellow anthers.
