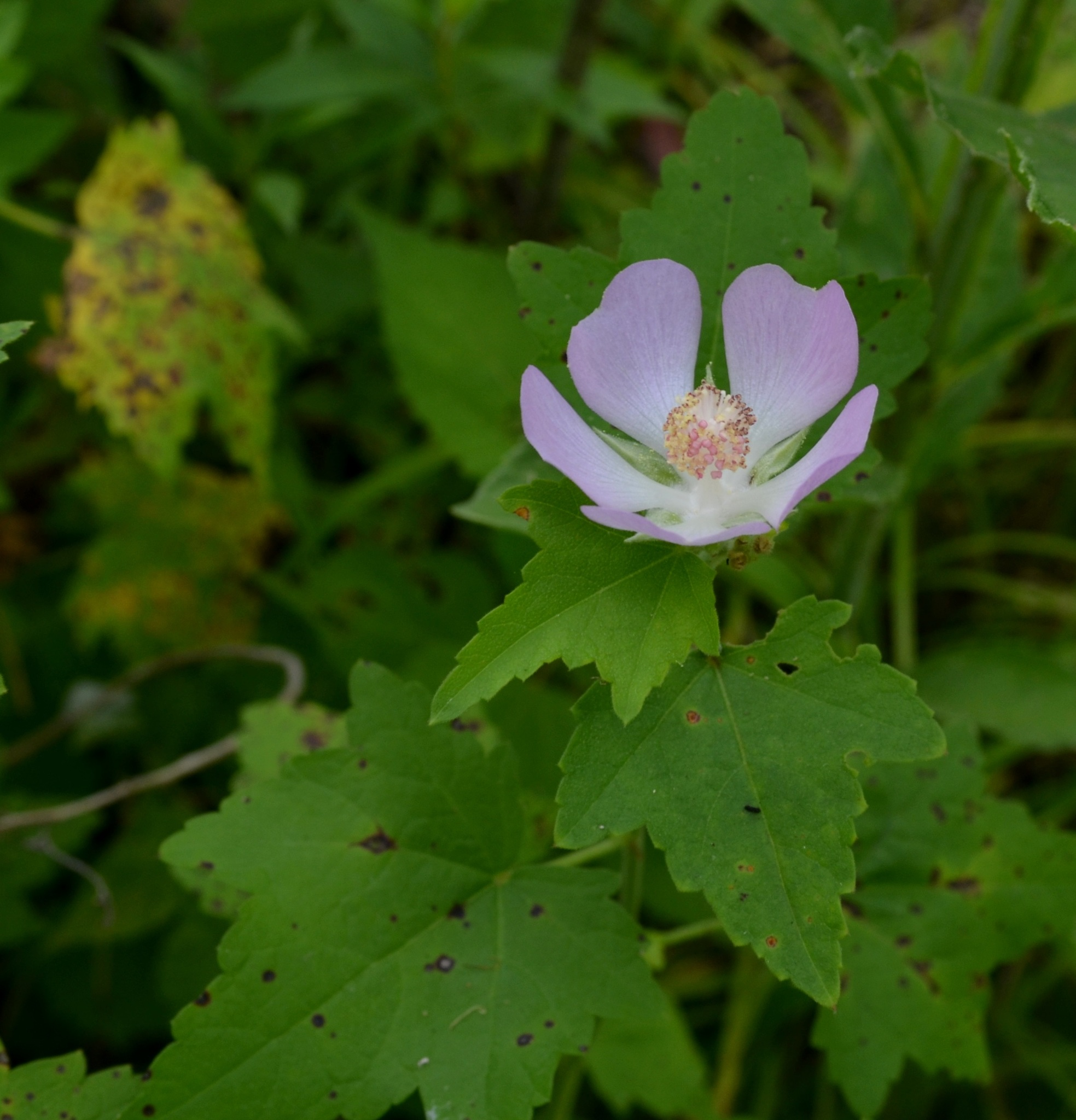
- Kankakee mallow

Conservation status
- Critically Imperiled (NatureServe)

Scientific classification
- Kingdom: Plantae
- Clade: Tracheophytes
- Clade: Angiosperms
- Clade: Eudicots
- Clade: Rosids
- Order: Malvales
- Family: Malvaceae
- Genus: Iliamna
- Species: I. remota

Binomial name
- Iliamna remota Greene

Synonyms
- Phymosia remota (Greene) Britt.; Sphaeralcea remota (Greene) Fernald

= Iliamna remota =

Species of flowering plant

Iliamna remota, commonly known as the Kankakee mallow, is an endangered species of flowering plant in the mallow family. It is endemic to a single location, the 700-metre-long (2,300 ft) Langham Island in Kankakee River State Park, in the US state of Illinois.

== Description ==
Iliamna remota is a herbaceous, perennial flowering plant growing from 1 m (3 ft 3 in) to 2.5 m (8 ft 2 in) tall. It has a greyish-green, densely hairy stem and alternate, palmately-lobed leaves. These have medium green, smooth upper surfaces and greyish-green pubescent undersides. The large flowers develop in the axils of the leaves, either singly or in groups of up to three, ranging in color from white to lavender. Anywhere from two to eight stems may grow from a single root crown and the roots themselves are generally shallow in depth while growing lengthy, dense, and fibrous tangles. Growth usually begins in the month of March, with flowering happening anywhere in July or August and eventual seed dispersal in September. New colonies sometimes develop from rhizomes.

== Taxonomy ==
The official classification for the species continues to be debated due to several related species in the Iliamna genus that are endemic to surrounding habitats in Illinois and other states. These species include the related Iliamna rivularis and Iliamna corei. However, the original taxonomic classification for the species was conducted by Edward Lee Greene in 1906, where he marked the species as separate from Iliamna rivularis due to "morphological differences of the calyx-lobes and carpels". Similar morphological distinction was made by botanist Earl Edward Sherff in his review of the species in 1949. A 2000 study by Tracey Bodo Slotta confirmed this distinction by looking at the genetic sequencing in the "internal transcribed spacer region in the nuclear ribosomal RNA subunits", confirming that I. remota was distinct from other Iliamna species.

== History ==
The first official documentation of the species was by Ellsworth Jerome Hill on June 29, 1872, while he was visiting the Langham Island that was then named Altorf Island after the nearby town of Altorf. The habitat of the species, Langham Island, was turned into an official nature preserve in 1966 for the Kankakee River area. Due to its small population and the fact that the range of the species was limited only to a single island, the species was placed onto the endangered species list for the state of Illinois in 1980. Botanist John Schwegman noted in a 1984 report that a 1973 survey by students at Westview High School in Illinois of the range of I. remota found that the population covered almost the entire northwestern part of the island. A 1981 survey found that a single colony of the species on the island contained around 109 flowering stems. Similar reports two years later found that this same colony had declined to just 49 stems and the overall species was made up of only 180 stems in five colonies.

John Schwegman devised a plan to help the population recover and flourish again on the island. This plan included wiping out other plant species on the island that reduced the sunlight reaching the low-lying I. remota stems by using both chemical methods and controlled burns. Regular surveys of the population were also to be conducted annually. This plan was first enacted in 1984 and continued to be followed for 19 years. In April 2001, it was discovered that brush burning of surrounding species significantly improved the growth of seedlings, with one area reaching 3,500 germinating seedlings after a brush burning was conducted. Overall, the plant survey two decades later showed that the average population on the island had increased from 180 stems to 1,646 stems in 2002, though a significant amount of that increase was recorded just within the previous year after brush burning was enacted. However, no further brush burnings were conducted from 2003 to 2014 and no continued management and oversight plan had been performed. During a 2005 investigation of the species population on the island, only "1,074 stems in 12 colonies" were found. The lack of sustained care for the species resulted in an almost complete eradication of mallow on the island, whereby not a single stem could be found by 2014. A local group named the "Friends of Langham Island" started a controlled burn in the winter of 2014 of the various invasive plant species that had overtaken the island. The following August, in 2015, they were able to confirm that mallow was growing on the island again, the seeds having been prompted to germinate after the burns.

A campaign was begun in 2015 by Robbie Telfer to have the Kankakee mallow named the state flower of Illinois, due to the fact that the previous state flower, the violet, is also the state flower for three other states. Representative Kate Cloonen has stated her support for starting an honorary resolution in the 2016 session of the Illinois General Assembly.
