= Stenopodius =

Scientific classification
- Kingdom: Animalia
- Phylum: Arthropoda
- Clade: Pancrustacea
- Class: Insecta
- Order: Coleoptera
- Suborder: Polyphaga
- Infraorder: Cucujiformia
- Family: Chrysomelidae
- Tribe: Chalepini
- Genus: Stenopodius; Horn, 1883

Genus of beetles

Stenopodius is a genus of tortoise beetles and hispines in the family Chrysomelidae. There are about seven described species in Stenopodius.

== Species ==
These seven species belong to the genus Stenopodius:

- Stenopodius flavidus Horn, 1883
- Stenopodius insularis Blaisdell, 1939
- Stenopodius inyoensis Blaisdell, 1939
- Stenopodius lateralis (Schaeffer, 1933)
- Stenopodius martini Blaisdell, 1939
- Stenopodius submaculatus Blaisdell, 1939
- Stenopodius texanus Schaeffer, 1933
