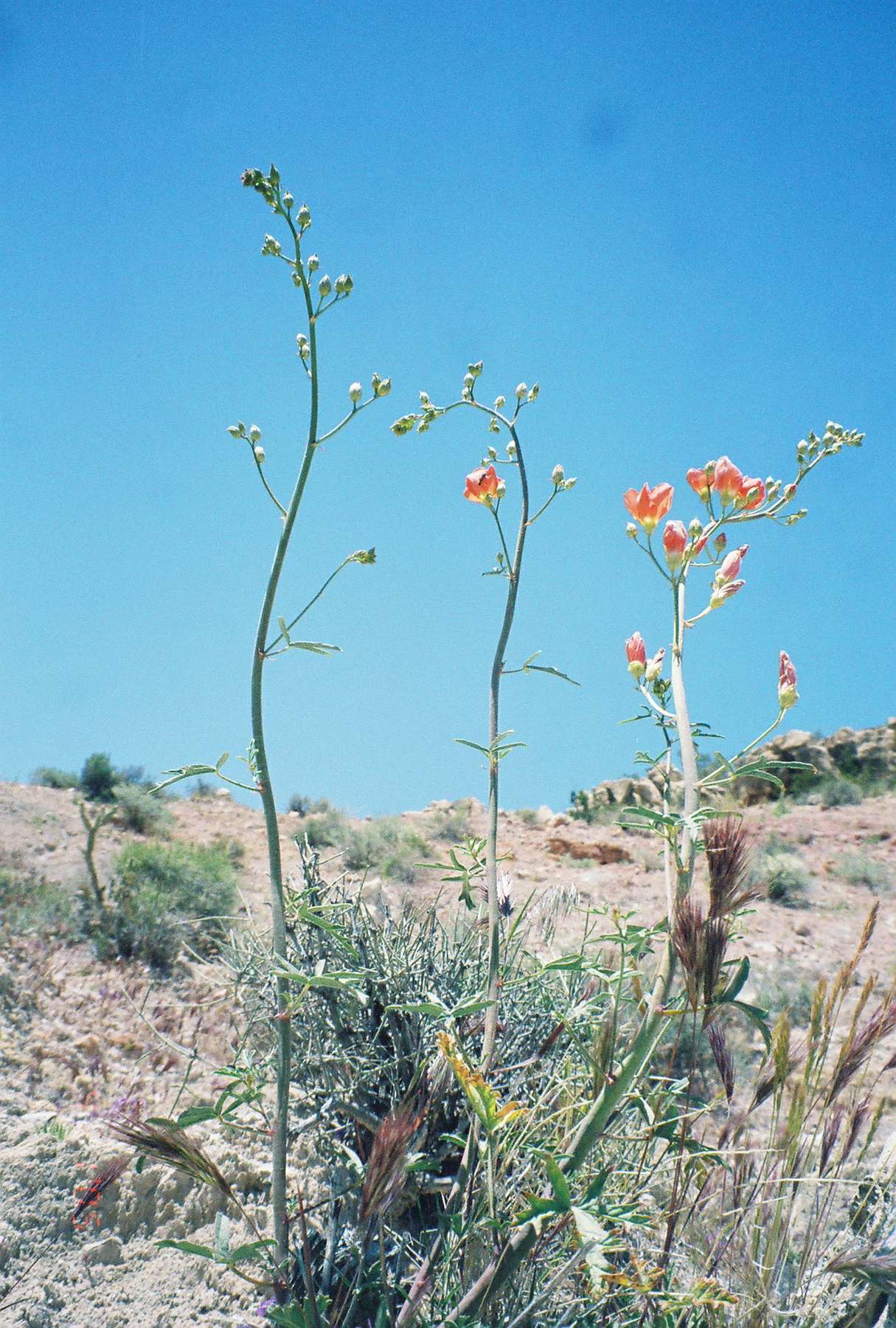

Conservation status
- Critically Imperiled (NatureServe)

Scientific classification
- Kingdom: Plantae
- Clade: Tracheophytes
- Clade: Angiosperms
- Clade: Eudicots
- Clade: Rosids
- Order: Malvales
- Family: Malvaceae
- Genus: Sphaeralcea
- Species: S. gierischii

Binomial name
- Sphaeralcea gierischii N.D.Atwood & S.L.Welsh

= Sphaeralcea gierischii =

Species of endangered plant

Sphaeralcea gierischii, Gierisch's globemallow or Gierisch mallow, is an endangered species of flowering plant in the mallow family, Malvaceae. It is native to the western United States, where it is known only from Utah and Arizona. It was described in 2002.

== Description ==
Sphaeralcea gierischii is a perennial plant. It produces clumps of dark reddish purple stems up to about a meter tall with a few bright green, lobed leaves. The flowers have petals up to 2.5 centimeters long. They are orange, or sometimes described as "grenadine".

== Distribution and habitat ==
There are only five known occurrences, with 90% of the population located within Mohave County, Arizona. It is threatened by open-pit mining for gypsum. The single occurrence in Utah is also threatened by off-road vehicle use and dumping.

== Ecology ==
Associated species include creosote bush, blackbrush, saltbush, yucca, ragweed, ephedra, rabbitbrush, prairie-clover, James' galleta, cheesebush, Anderson's desert thorn, prickly pear, indigo bush, and cliffrose.

The plant is nearly an obligate gypsophile, mainly limited to the gypsum soils of the Kaibab Limestone; it has also been seen on limestone soils. The gypsum is sought after and extensively mined in the area by a process that involves removing the top layer of rock, mining the gypsum-rich deeper layers, and filling the pit with the rubble of the top layer. This process is very destructive to the local habitat.

== Conservation ==
In 2012, it was proposed as an endangered species under the Endangered Species Act. In 2013 it was granted endangered status.

Since 2011, Red Butte Garden's Conservation Department in Salt Lake City, Utah, has been conducting germination, propagation, and transplant studies at a site in Arizona, just South of St. George, UT. The studies are meant to assess the feasibility of reintroducing S. gierischii to reclaimed gypsum mine tailings.
