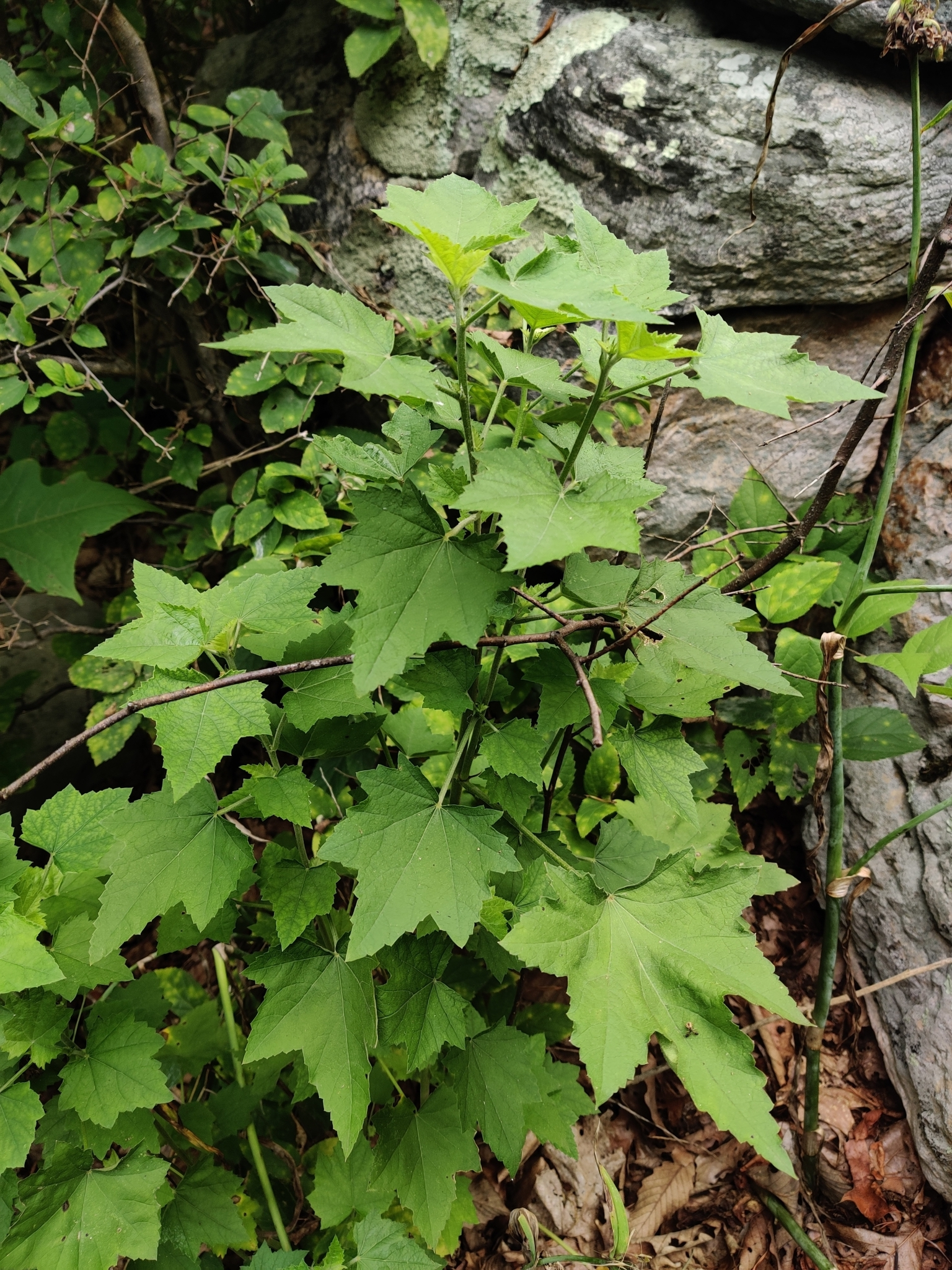

Conservation status
- Critically Imperiled (NatureServe)

Scientific classification
- Kingdom: Plantae
- Clade: Tracheophytes
- Clade: Angiosperms
- Clade: Eudicots
- Clade: Rosids
- Order: Malvales
- Family: Malvaceae
- Genus: Iliamna
- Species: I. corei

Binomial name
- Iliamna corei Sherff

= Iliamna corei =

Species of flowering plant

Iliamna corei is a rare species of flowering plant in the mallow family known by the common name Peters Mountain mallow. It is endemic to Virginia in the United States, where it is known only from Peters Mountain in Giles County. A single occurrence remains. This is a federally listed endangered species. It is considered "one of the rarest native plants in the United States."

== Taxonomy ==
Iliamna corei is a part of the Malvaceae family and is one of the only eight species in the Iliamna genus. The plant is also one out of the only two species in the genus found in the eastern region of the United States. This plant is also closely related to Iliamna remota, also known as the streambank wild hollyhock or the Kankakee mallow.

This species has sometimes been included within the description of Iliamna remota, but genetic analysis suggests it be maintained as a species in its own right.

The similarities between the two species have made it challenging to determine whether they are distinct species or variations of the same species. However, genetic work has revealed that Iliamna corei is a distinct species, rather than a population of Iliamna remota. Furthermore, the two species are isolated from each other, further supporting the classification of Iliamna corei as a separate species.

== Description ==
This plant is a perennial herb producing an erect stem up to 1.5 meters tall and bearing pink flowers. The leaves are divided into wide, pointed lobes and the herbage is hairy. The leaves are approximately 5–10 cm wide and have serrated leaf margins.

The species is able to produce 15 to 20 odorless flowers. The flowering period is from late June to August. The whole flower is about 2 inches in diameter. The flowers of I. corei have five obovate and asymmetric petals that are nearly 2.5 cm long and have colors ranging from pale pink to deep rose.

Iliamna corei produces schizocarps, which contain seeds that disperse once the schizocarps are dry. The seeds are about 12 mm in diameter, and they contain about 2-3 dark brown, puberulent seeds that are about 2.5 mm in length.

== Habitat and distribution ==
There is one small population of this plant located on Peters Mountain in western Virginia. In 1990, this population contained only three or four individuals. The plants grow on nooks in a sandstone outcrop that have accumulated a small amount of soil. The population is so small that remaining individuals are inbred. Conservation efforts are focused on increasing the plant's numbers to improve genetic diversity.

It grows at an altitude of around 3000 feet above sea level. This plant species is found near the ridgeline of the mountain known as the Narrows, specifically on Peters Mountain in Giles County.

The surrounding vegetation where I. corei is found is characterized by oak-dominated forests, along with other hardwood and pine trees. These plants have adapted to thrive in dry soil due to their ecological niche, as they are unable to compete with less fire-tolerant hardwood species. This ecological adaptation has led to their preference for these dry soil environments as their primary habitat.

The I. corei is known as a food source for animals such as deer and compete with other vegetation such as the Canadian leaf-cup (Polymnia canadensis).

== Conservation efforts ==
Iliamna corei, is a plant species that is endemic to Peters Mountain, located in Giles County, Virginia.

This critically endangered plant was first discovered in 1927, with an initial population of only 50 plants. Over time, the population has declined, and by 1992, only 3 specimens of Iliamna corei were believed to be left in the area, leading to concerns about inbreeding due to the small population size.

Iliamna corei is classified as critically endangered due to its limited habitat distribution. The species is located approximately 3,000 feet above sea Human activity has been identified as a major threat to the survival of this species. To address the issue of low population size, cross-pollination techniques are being used to facilitate reproduction and increase the population of Iliamna corei. Additionally, prescribed burns are being employed to create suitable conditions for the species to thrive.

Efforts to conserve and protect the Iliamna corei are being undertaken by the Center for Plant Conservation, which has included the species in its National Collection of Endangered Plants. These conservation efforts are crucial in ensuring the survival of I. corei.

In 1986, the Department of Agriculture and Consumer Services, the U.S. Fish and Wildlife Service, and The Nature Conservancy jointly provided funding to support a research program at Virginia Polytechnic Institute and State University. The primary aim of the program was to comprehensively investigate and gather essential information necessary for the recovery of the I. corei. The dedicated team of botanists embarked on a series of experiments to identify the key factors limiting the population of I. corei.

In 1990, a team of researchers at the University of Kentucky made a significant discovery related to the germination of Iliamna corei seeds demonstrating that germination of these seeds is specifically stimulated by fire.

This plant is dependent on wildfire. Its seeds require scarification in order to germinate. This is naturally accomplished during fires, when the heat breaks the tough outer layer of the seed. When plants are propagated by hand, the seeds must be scarified by nicking the outer surface with a blade or soaking them in acid or boiling water. A conservation plan for the species will include establishing a normal fire regime for the habitat.

Since around 2001-2004 dedicated conservation efforts have been made for the I. corei. The Nature Conservancy of Virginia got involved by purchasing a 398-acre piece of land, now known as the Narrows Preserve, to protect the habitat of this species. Within the preserve, various strategies have been implemented to support the population, including the use of plant cages to reduce herbivore impact, thinning the overstory, and implementing prescribed burns. These efforts were considered necessary due to evidence suggesting a lack of natural wildfires in the area. The species has evolved to rely on occasional wildfires for successful reproduction and population growth.

Research indicates that prescribed burns carried out at a frequency of every 2.2 years can significantly enhance the germination and growth of I. corei.

Iliamna corei is not listed on the ICUN Red List.

Seed banking is being considered as a crucial step in the conservation of Iliamna corei. Institutions such as the North Carolina Botanical Garden, Virginia Tech, and the University of Virginia's Blandy Experimental Farm are actively involved in exploring seed banking as a conservation strategy for this species.
