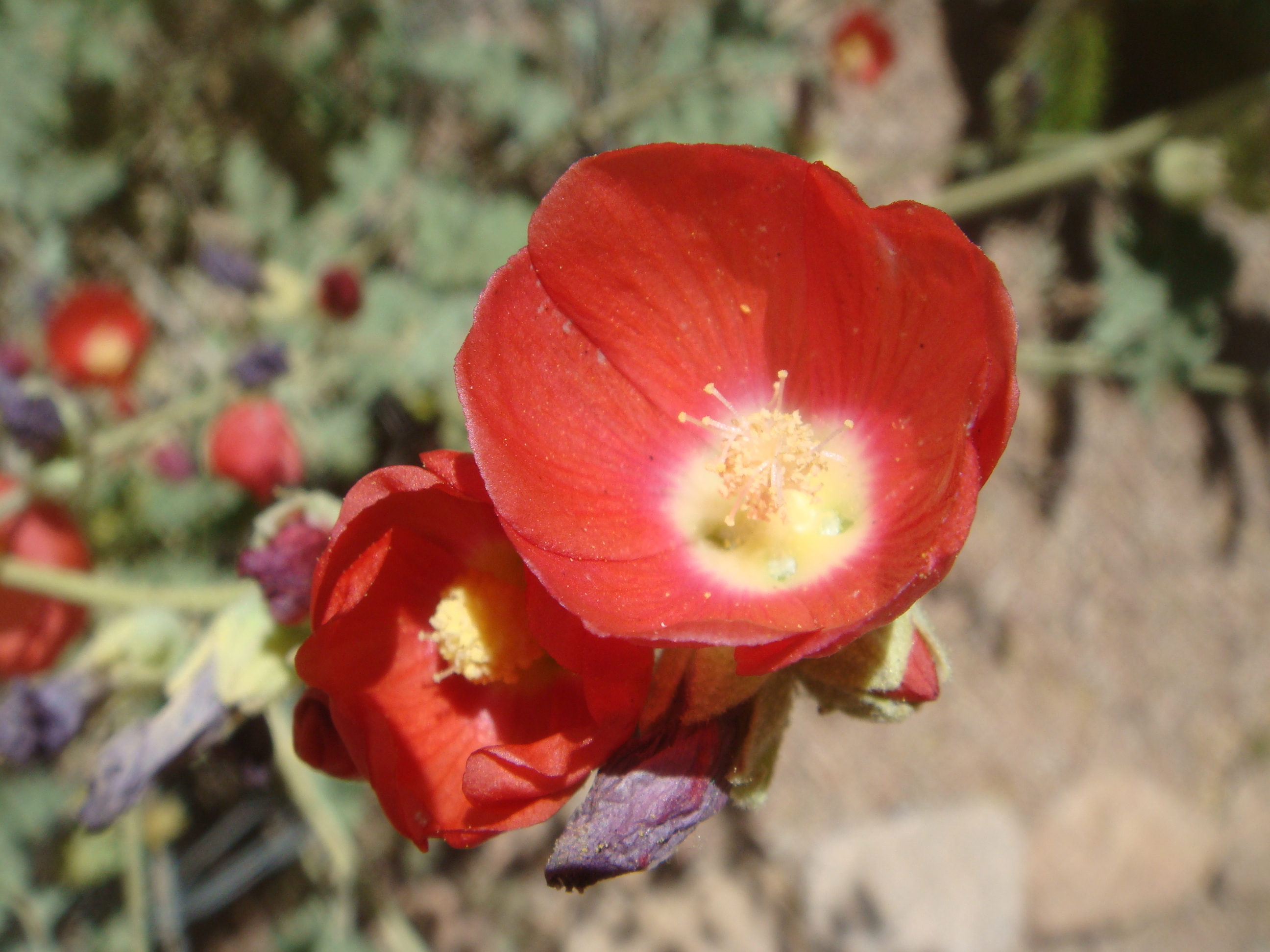

Scientific classification
- Kingdom: Plantae
- Clade: Tracheophytes
- Clade: Angiosperms
- Clade: Eudicots
- Clade: Rosids
- Order: Malvales
- Family: Malvaceae
- Genus: Sphaeralcea
- Species: S. rusbyi

Binomial name
- Sphaeralcea rusbyi A.Gray

= Sphaeralcea rusbyi =

Species of flowering plant

Sphaeralcea rusbyi is a species of flowering plant in the mallow family known by the common names Rusby's globemallow and Rusby's desert-mallow. It is native to the southwestern United States, where it can be found in various types of desert habitat. The species is generally divided into three subtaxa which grow in separate sections of the desert southwest. In general, the plant produces hairy or woolly stems which can reach three meters tall. The leaves are lobed or compound. The flowers each have five red-orange petals up to 2 centimeters long.
