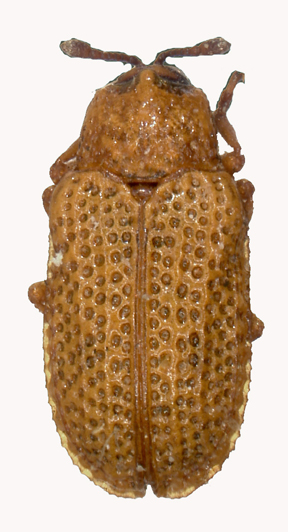

Scientific classification
- Kingdom: Animalia
- Phylum: Arthropoda
- Class: Insecta
- Order: Coleoptera
- Suborder: Polyphaga
- Infraorder: Cucujiformia
- Family: Chrysomelidae
- Genus: Stenopodius
- Species: S. flavidus

Binomial name
- Stenopodius flavidus Horn, 1883

= Stenopodius flavidus =

Species of beetle

Stenopodius flavidus is a species of leaf beetle in the family Chrysomelidae. It is found in Central America and North America, where it has been recorded from the United States (Arizona, California, Kansas, Nevada, New Mexico, Oregon, Texas, Washington, Wyoming) and Mexico (Baja California).

== Biology ==
The recorded food plant is Sphaeralcea grossulariifoliae. Adults have been collected on Alcea rosea, Gossypium species, Horsfordia alata, Malacothamnus fasciculatus, Malva species, Malvastrum species and Sphaeralcea orcuttii.
