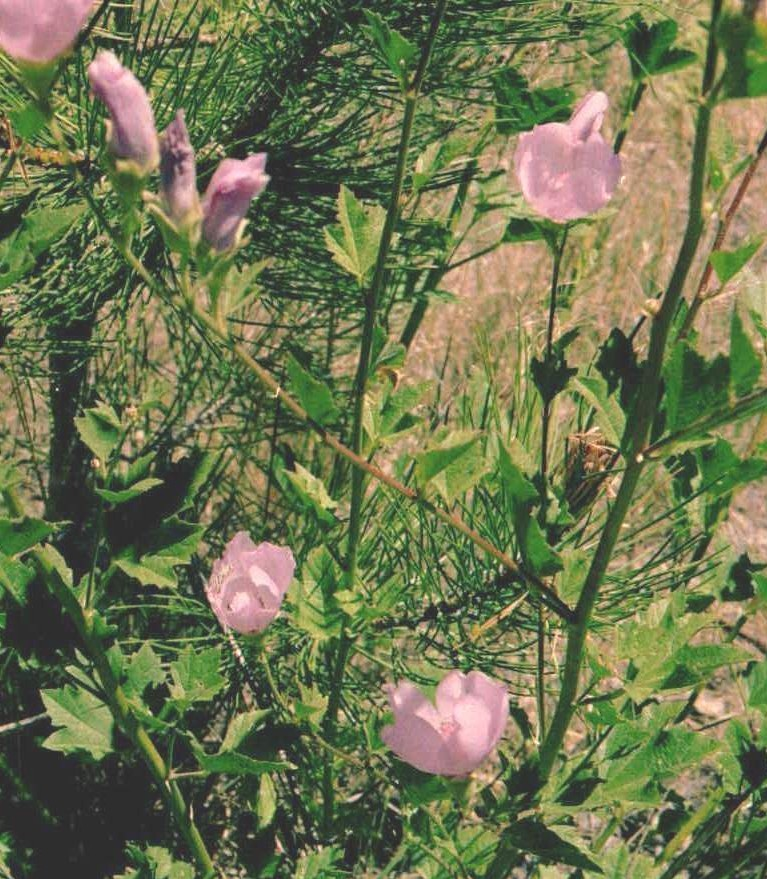

Scientific classification
- Kingdom: Plantae
- Clade: Tracheophytes
- Clade: Angiosperms
- Clade: Eudicots
- Clade: Rosids
- Order: Malvales
- Family: Malvaceae
- Genus: Iliamna
- Species: I. bakeri

Binomial name
- Iliamna bakeri (Jeps.) Wiggins

= Iliamna bakeri =

Species of flowering plant

Iliamna bakeri is an uncommon species of flowering plant in the mallow family known by the common names Baker's globe mallow and Baker's wild hollyhock.

It is endemic to northeastern California and southeastern Oregon. It grows in the Southern Cascade Range and Modoc Plateau forests and woodlands on volcanic soils.

== Description ==
This is a perennial herb with a densely hairy stem growing from a woody caudex to heights between 30 and 70 centimetres (11 5/6 and 27 1/2 in). It produces rough-haired, three-pointed leaves on thick petioles, each 1 to 5 centimetres (1/3 to 2 in) centimeters long.

It blooms in abundant cup-shaped pink-lavender flowers with five petals each 1 to 3 centimetres (1/3 to 1 1/6 in) long. The fruit is a small, bristly capsule.

== Conservation ==
This species is endangered on the state level in Oregon. Threats to its existence include wildland fire suppression and forest habitat destruction by human activity such as logging.
