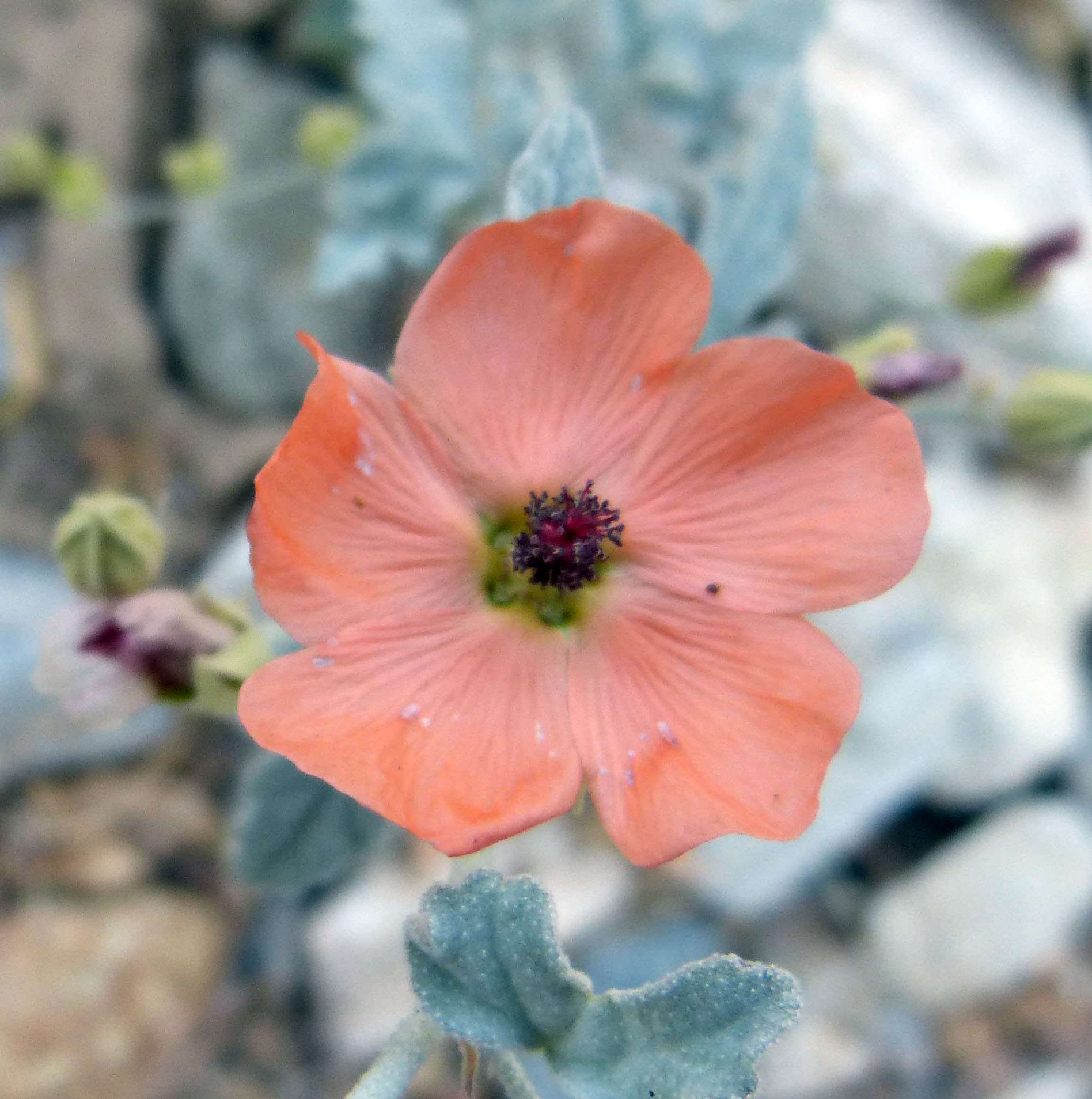

Scientific classification
- Kingdom: Plantae
- Clade: Tracheophytes
- Clade: Angiosperms
- Clade: Eudicots
- Clade: Rosids
- Order: Malvales
- Family: Malvaceae
- Genus: Sphaeralcea
- Species: S. laxa

Binomial name
- Sphaeralcea laxa Wooton & Standl.

Synonyms
- Sphaeralcea ribifolia Wooton & Standl.

= Sphaeralcea laxa =

Species of flowering plant

Sphaeralcea laxa, with the common name caliche globemallow, is a desert plant in the mallow family (Malvaceae).
