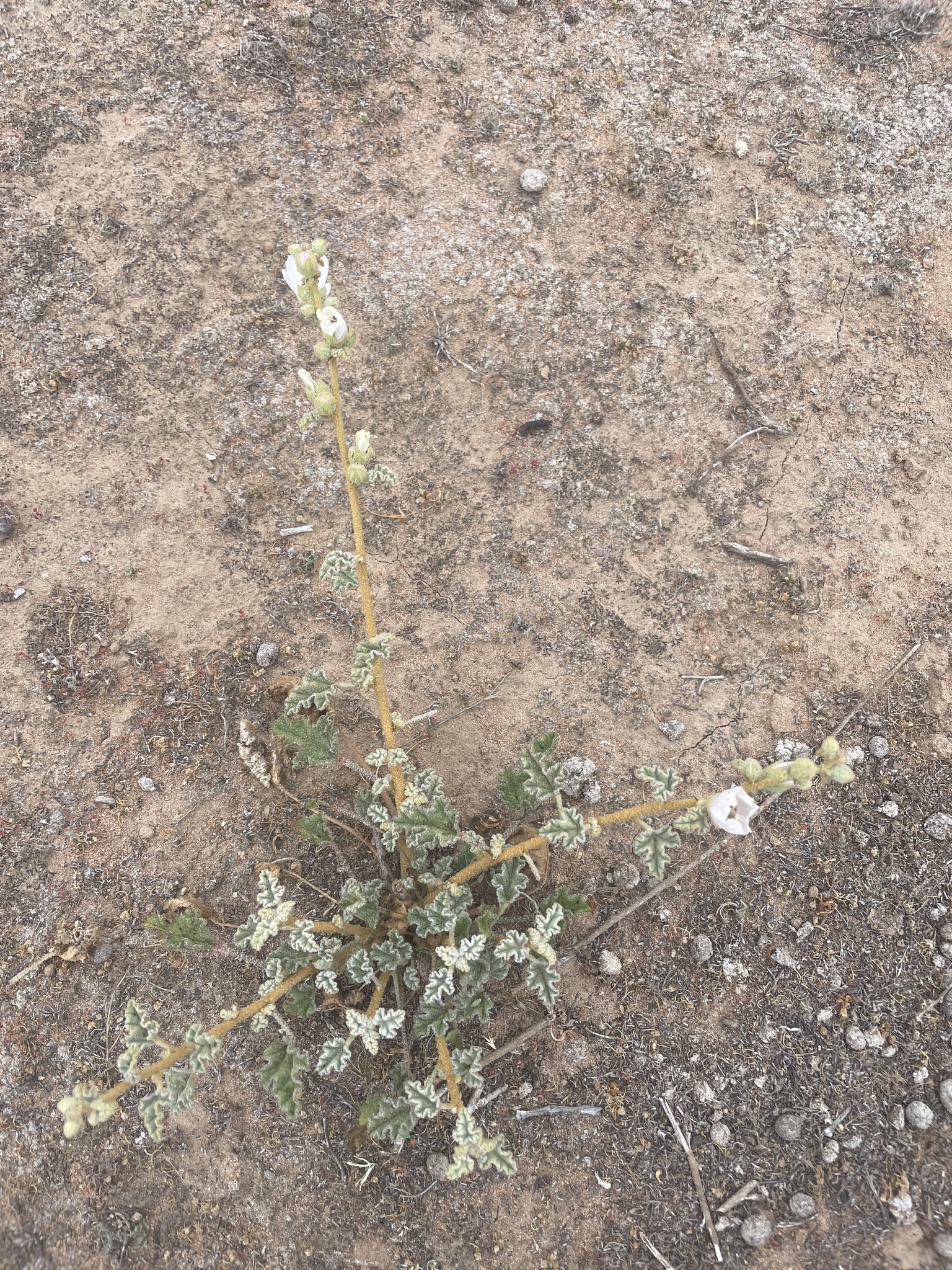
- Desert mallow Sphaeralcea fulva

Scientific classification
- Kingdom: Plantae
- Clade: Tracheophytes
- Clade: Angiosperms
- Clade: Eudicots
- Clade: Rosids
- Order: Malvales
- Family: Malvaceae
- Genus: Sphaeralcea
- Species: S. fulva

Binomial name
- Sphaeralcea fulva Greene

= Sphaeralcea fulva =

Desert mallow

Species of flowering plant in the mallow family

Sphaeralcea fulva, commonly known as desert mallow, is a species of flowering plant in the family Malvaceae. It is native to northwestern Mexico.

== Description ==
Sphaeralcea fulva is a perennial shrub which grows to 2–4 feet (0.61–1.22 m) high. It was described by Greene as growing erect and stout, sparingly branching, suffrutescent, and covered with a yellowish stellate pubescence. Leaves are small, triangular-lanceolate in shape, thick and firm in texture, and coarsely toothed. The calyx is cleft below the middle into triangular acute segments. The corolla is 3/4 inch (1.9 cm) long, light scarlet in color.

== Taxonomy ==
Sphaeralcea fulva was first formally described by American botanist Edward Lee Greene in his first volume of Pittonia, published in 1889. It was one of several species described from types from Albert Kellogg's unpublished work.

== Habitat ==
In Isla Natividad, it was observed to be common in canyons and canyon bottoms in the northern portion of the island. It has also been described as growing in clay soil.
