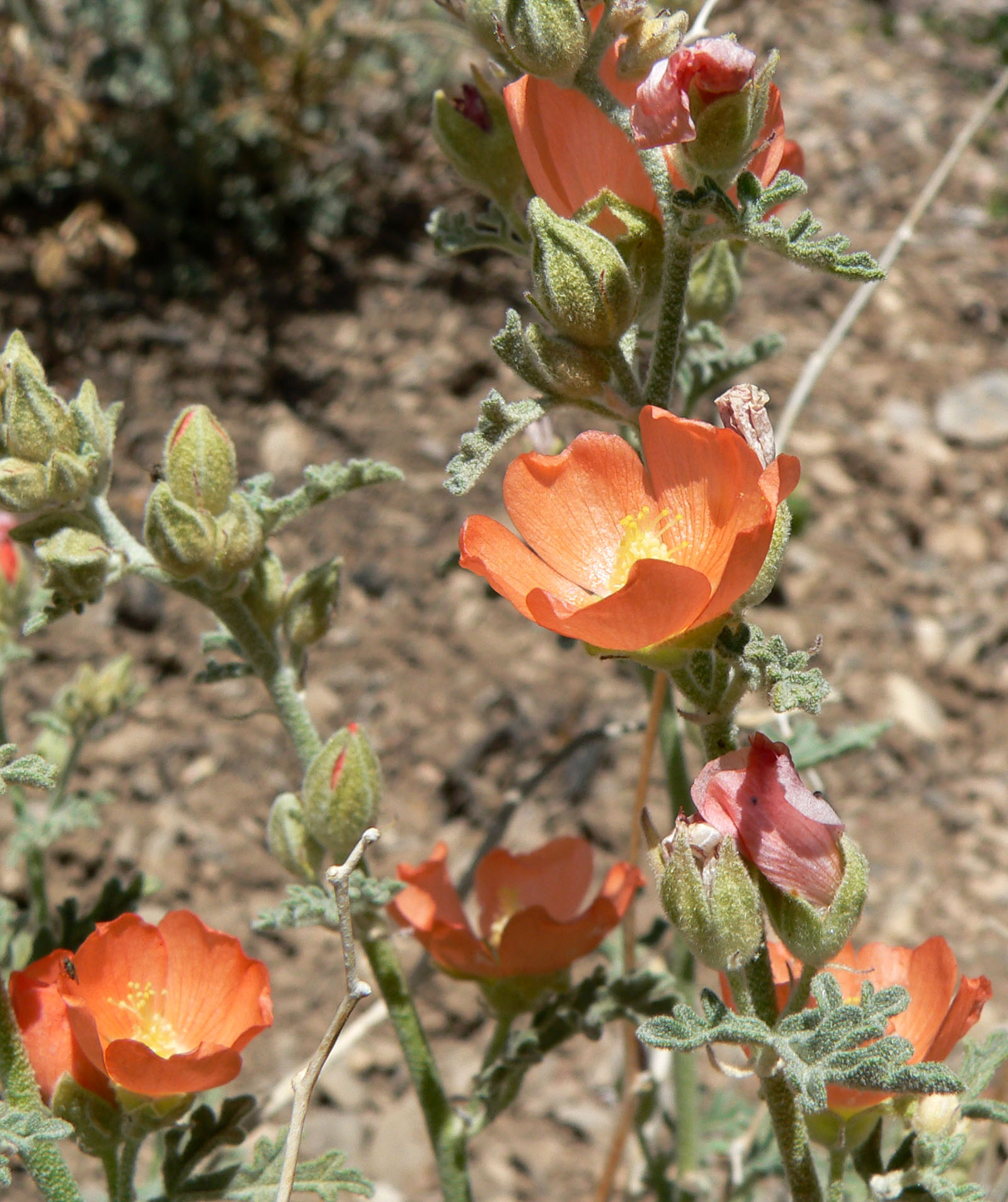

Scientific classification
- Kingdom: Plantae
- Clade: Tracheophytes
- Clade: Angiosperms
- Clade: Eudicots
- Clade: Rosids
- Order: Malvales
- Family: Malvaceae
- Genus: Sphaeralcea
- Species: S. grossulariifolia

Binomial name
- Sphaeralcea grossulariifolia (Hook. & Arn.) Rydb.

= Sphaeralcea grossulariifolia =

Species of flowering plant

Sphaeralcea grossulariifolia is a species of flowering plant in the mallow family known by the common name gooseberryleaf globemallow. It is native to the western United States, where it can be found in the Great Basin and surrounding regions. It grows in sagebrush, woodlands, playas, and the canyons of the upper Colorado River. It is common in disturbed areas, such as habitat recently cleared by wildfire.

== Description ==
Sphaeralcea grossulariifolia is a perennial herb that produces erect stems up to 1 m. (3 ft.) tall from a woody base. The root system is large, constituting a stout, tough taproot and a spreading fibrous root network.

The herbage is usually woolly in texture, but hairless specimens are known, and it is gray-green to purplish in color. The leaves have three-lobed blades with toothed or lobed edges, measuring up to 3.5 centimeters long. As the plant's name suggests, the leaves are sometimes shaped like those of plants in the family Grossulariaceae, the currants and gooseberries.

Flowers occur in a raceme-like inflorescence. Each flower has five red-orange petals each 1 to 2 centimeters long. The flowers are pollinated by many bee species and by wasps of the genus Ammoplanus.
