= Langham Island =

Island in Illinois, United States

Coordinates: 41°11′17″N 87°57′53″W

Langham Island is a river island located in the Kankakee River, Kankakee County, Illinois, United States.

== Plant life ==
The plant Iliamna remota is endemic only on Langham Island.
