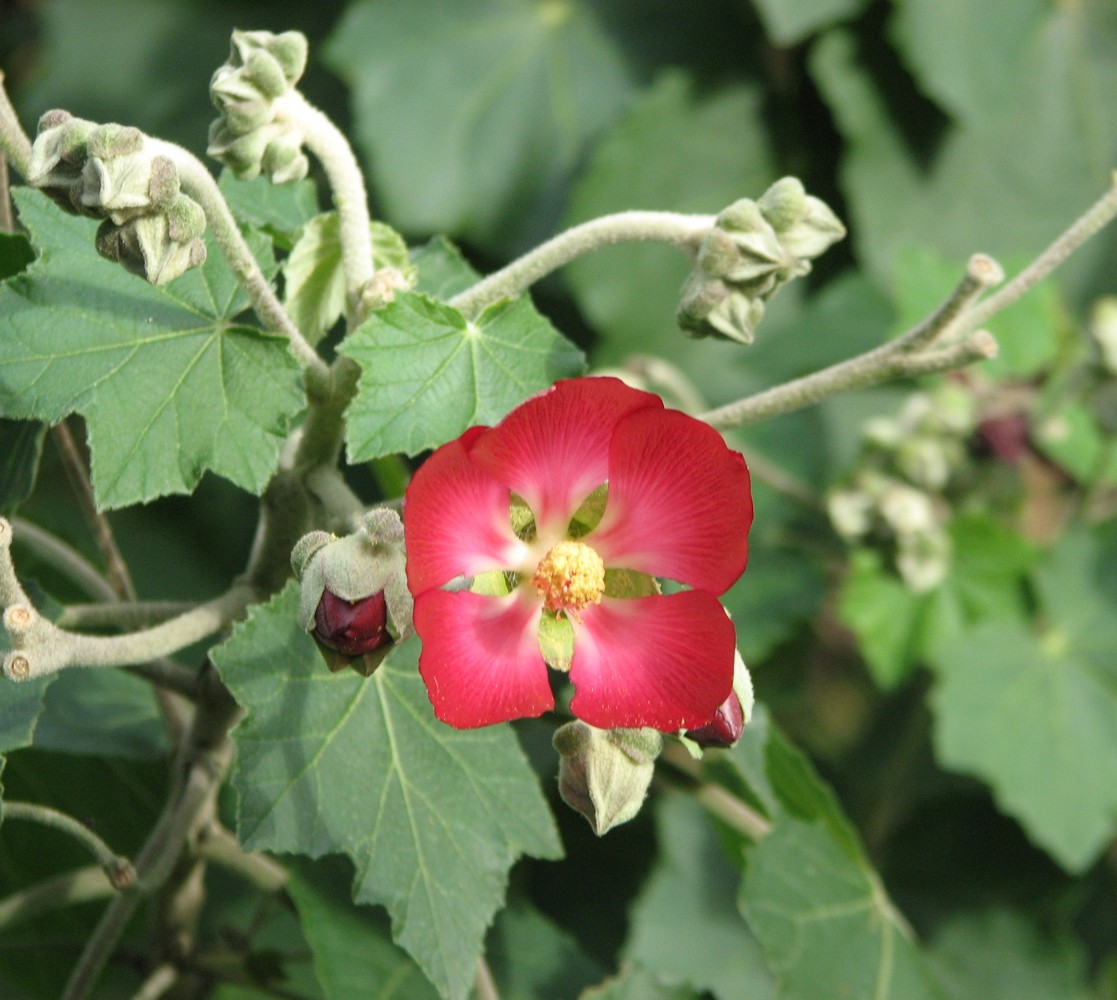

Conservation status
- Least Concern (IUCN 3.1)

Scientific classification
- Kingdom: Plantae
- Clade: Tracheophytes
- Clade: Angiosperms
- Clade: Eudicots
- Clade: Rosids
- Order: Malvales
- Family: Malvaceae
- Genus: Phymosia
- Species: P. umbellata

Binomial name
- Phymosia umbellata (Cav.) Kearney

Synonyms
- Malva umbellata Cav; Sphaeralcea umbellata (Cav.) G.Don

= Phymosia umbellata =

Species of flowering plant

Phymosia umbellata is a species of flowering plant in the family Malvaceae. It is native to Mexico and is cultivated as an ornamental plant.

This tropical evergreen shrub grows to 3 m (9.8 ft) in height, with cup shaped scarlet flowers produced mainly in summer.

In temperate areas it requires a warm, sheltered position.
