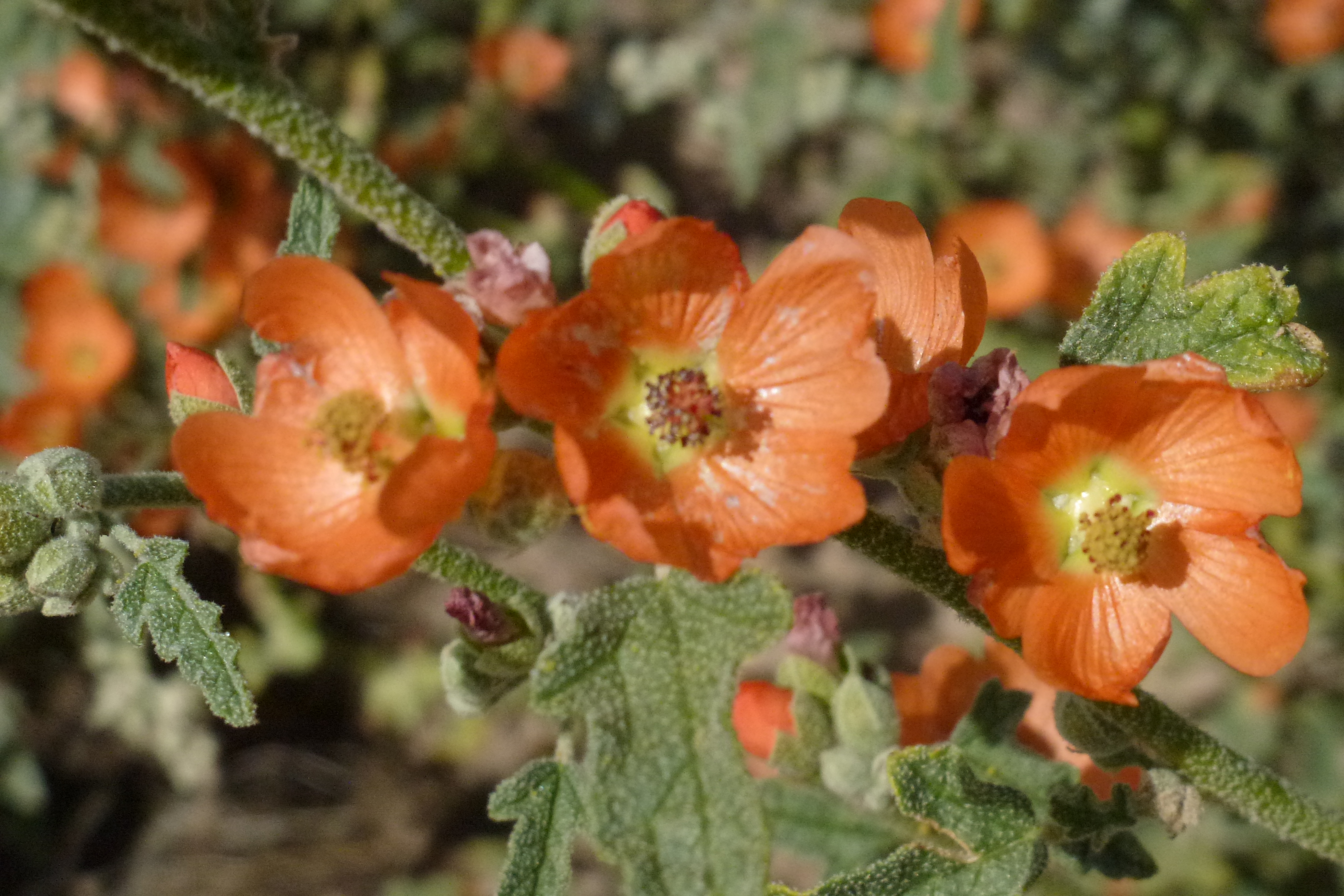

Scientific classification
- Kingdom: Plantae
- Clade: Tracheophytes
- Clade: Angiosperms
- Clade: Eudicots
- Clade: Rosids
- Order: Malvales
- Family: Malvaceae
- Genus: Sphaeralcea
- Species: S. emoryi

Binomial name
- Sphaeralcea emoryi Torr. ex A.Gray

= Sphaeralcea emoryi =

Species of flowering plant

Sphaeralcea emoryi is a species of flowering plant in the mallow family known by the common name Emory's globemallow. It is native to the Southwestern United States, California and Northwestern Mexico. It grows in desert habitat and sometimes disturbed areas such as roadsides.

== Description ==
Sphaeralcea emoryi can be similar to its relative, copper globemallow (Sphaeralcea angustifolia).

It has woolly erect stems that can exceed two meters in height. The gray-green leaf blades are oval to triangular, usually lobed on the edges, and up to 5.5 centimeters long.

The showy inflorescence bears clusters of flowers each with five petals around a centimeter long. The petals are usually orange, or sometimes lavender.
