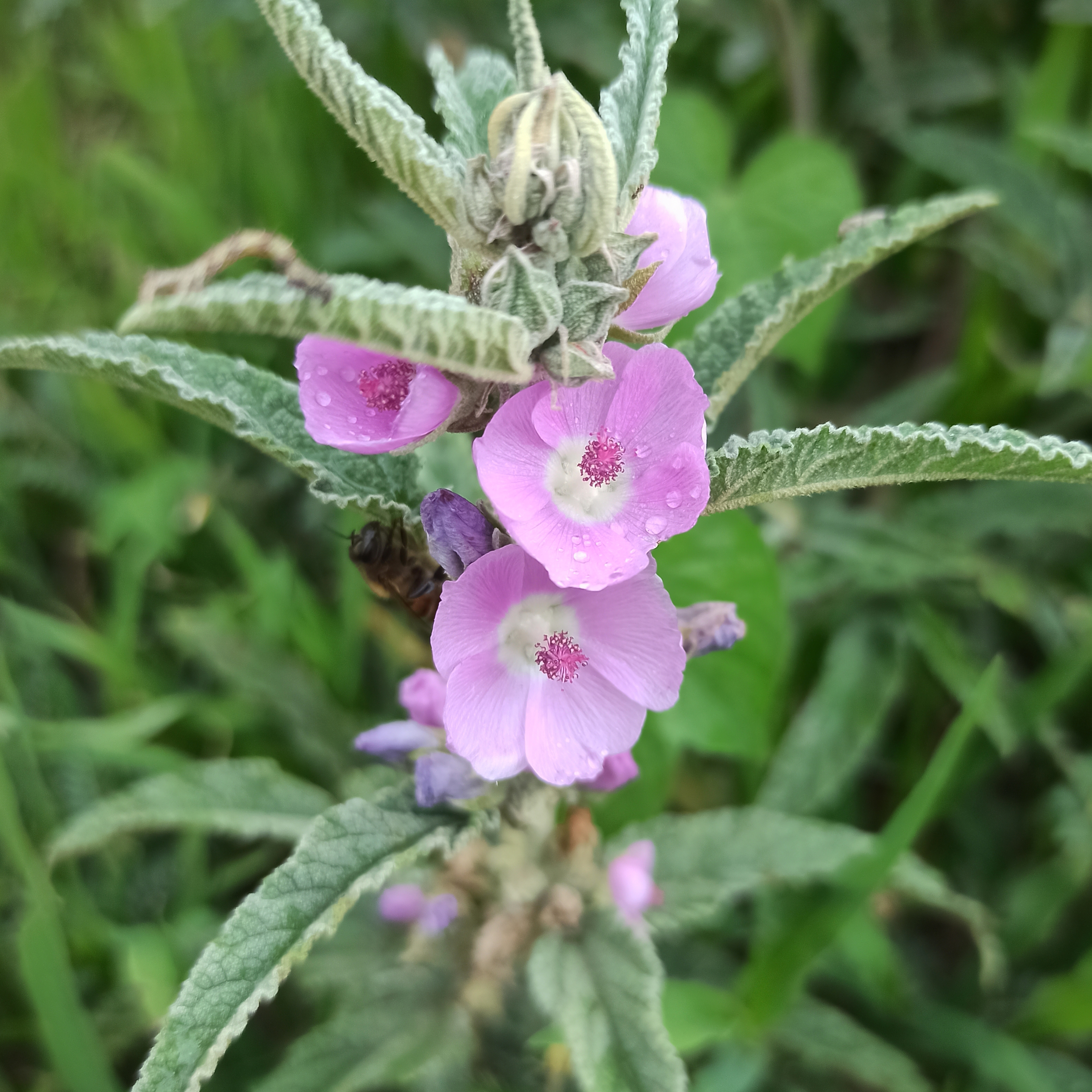

Conservation status
- Secure (NatureServe)

Scientific classification
- Kingdom: Plantae
- Clade: Tracheophytes
- Clade: Angiosperms
- Clade: Eudicots
- Clade: Rosids
- Order: Malvales
- Family: Malvaceae
- Genus: Sphaeralcea
- Species: S. angustifolia

Binomial name
- Sphaeralcea angustifolia (Cav.) G.Don

Varieties
- S. angustifolia var. angustifolia; S. angustifolia var. oblongifolia

Synonyms
- List: Malva angustifolia Cav.; Malvastrum angustifolium (Cav.) Hemsl.; Malveopsis angustifolia (Cav.) Kuntze; Sphaeroma angustifolium (Cav.) Schltdl.

= Sphaeralcea angustifolia =

Plant species in the family

Sphaeralcea angustifolia is a species of flowering plant in the mallow family known by the common names copper globemallow and narrow-leaved globemallow. It is native to the southwestern United States as well as northern and central Mexico, where it grows in desert and plateau habitat. It produces many erect stems, approaching three meters in maximum height. It is woolly or felt-like in texture. The gray-green leaf blades are lance-shaped and measure up to about 5 cm long. They have wavy or slightly lobed edges. The leafy inflorescence bears several flowers each with five wedge-shaped orange petals just under 1 cm in length, and yellow anthers.
