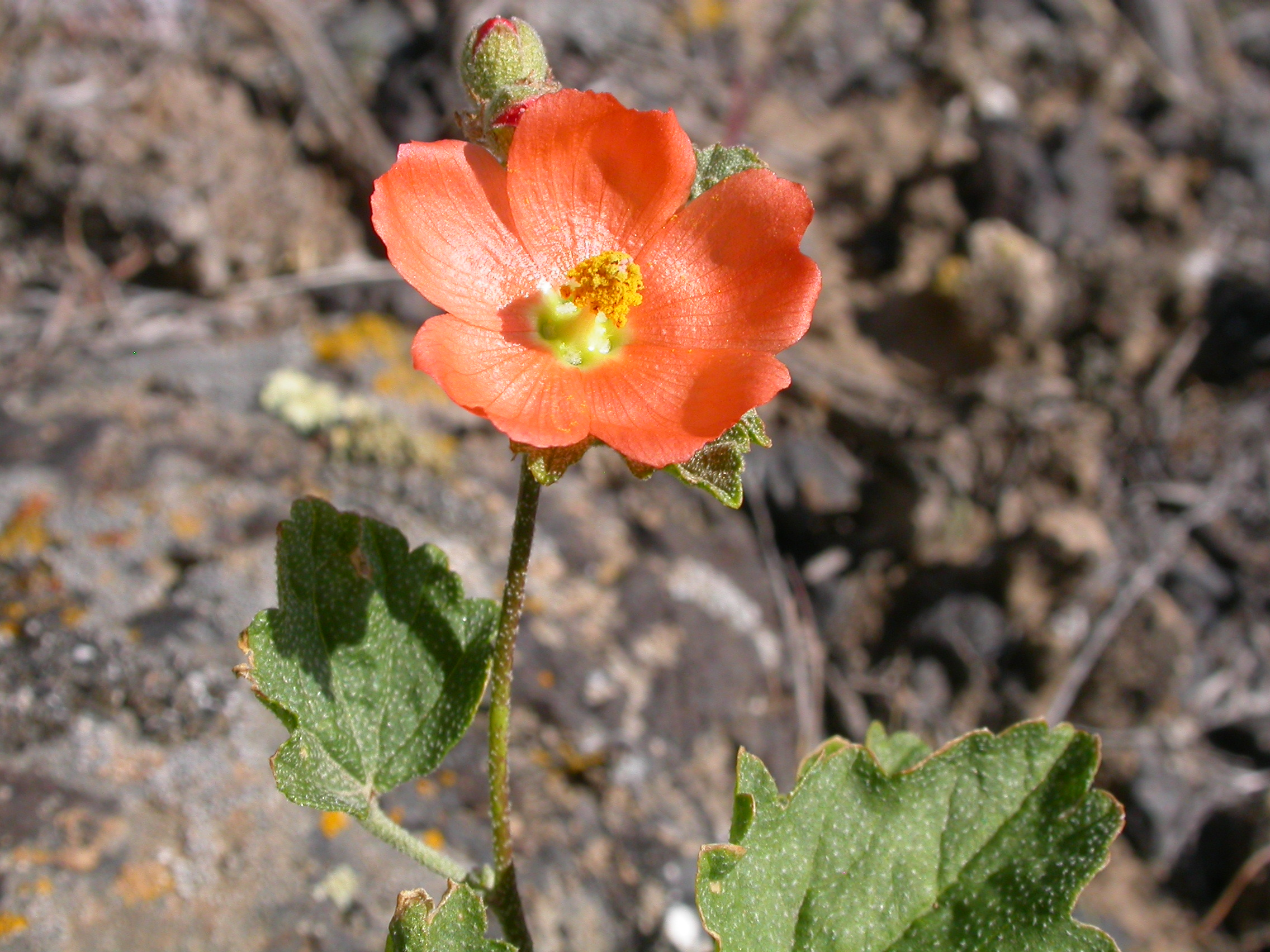

Conservation status
- Apparently Secure (NatureServe)

Scientific classification
- Kingdom: Plantae
- Clade: Embryophytes
- Clade: Tracheophytes
- Clade: Spermatophytes
- Clade: Angiosperms
- Clade: Eudicots
- Clade: Rosids
- Order: Malvales
- Family: Malvaceae
- Genus: Sphaeralcea
- Species: S. munroana

Binomial name
- Sphaeralcea munroana (Douglas ex Lindl.) Spach

Synonyms
- List: Malva munroana Douglas ex Lindl.; Malvastrum munroanum (Douglas ex Lindl.) A.Gray; Malveopsis munroana (Douglas ex Lindl.) Kuntze; Nuttallia munroana (Douglas ex Lindl.) Nutt.; Sphaeralcea subrhomboidea Rydb.

= Sphaeralcea munroana =

Plant species in the mallow family

Sphaeralcea munroana is a species of flowering plant in the mallow family known by the common names Munro's globemallow, Munro's desert-mallow and orange globe mallow. It is native to the western United States, where it can be found in the Great Basin, the Columbia Plateau and surrounding regions. It grows in shrub-steppe, desert flats, mountain slopes, and prefers moderately sandy or rocky sites. This perennial herb produces erect stems up to about 80 centimetres (31 in) tall from a thick root system. It is woolly and gray-green in color. The alternately arranged leaves have triangular blades up to 6 cm long, usually edged with large lobes and a toothed margin. Flowers occur in clusters on a raceme along upper stems, which are leafless at the top. The flower has five apricot to red-orange petals each just over 1 cm long.
