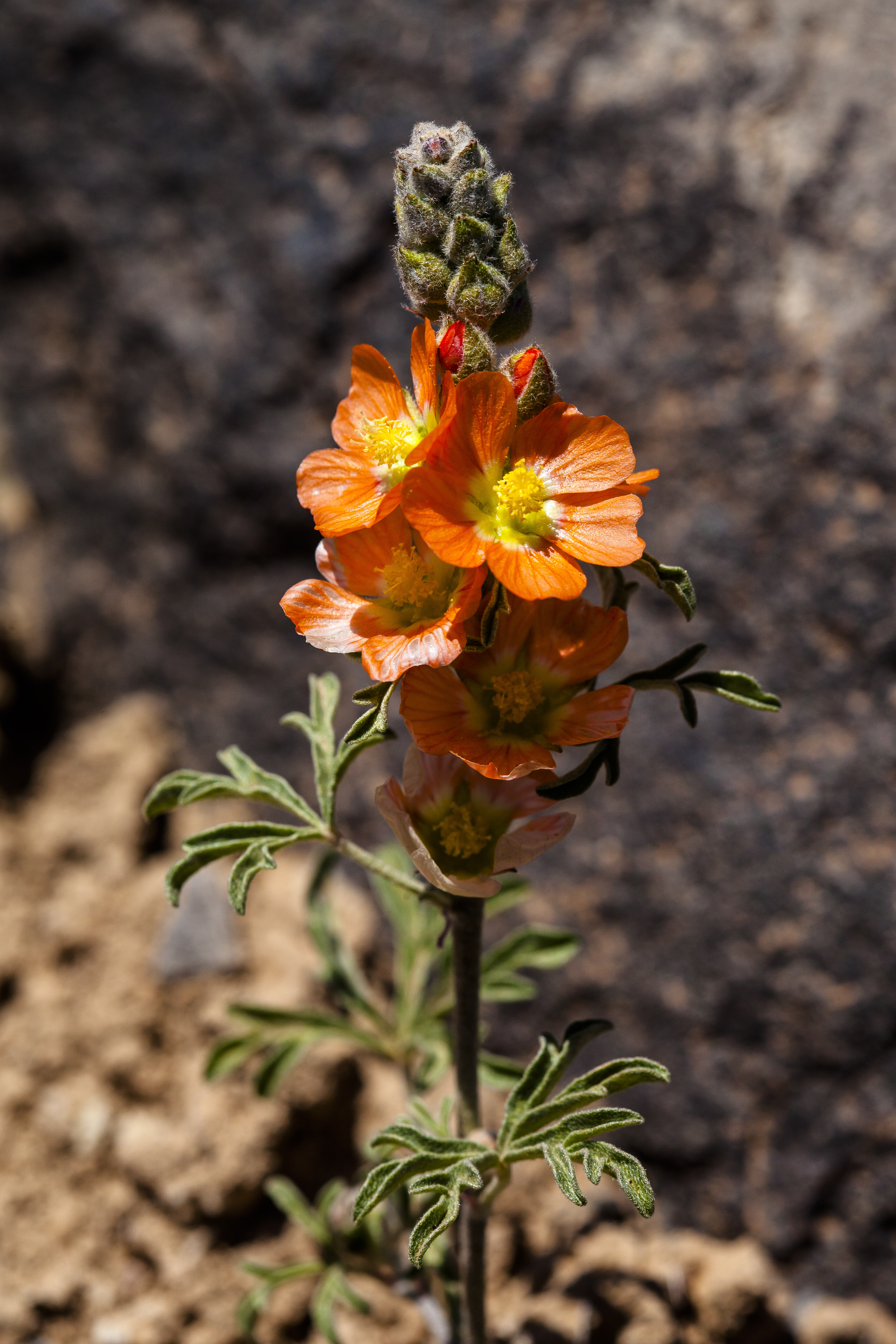

Conservation status
- Secure (NatureServe)

Scientific classification
- Kingdom: Plantae
- Clade: Tracheophytes
- Clade: Angiosperms
- Clade: Eudicots
- Clade: Rosids
- Order: Malvales
- Family: Malvaceae
- Genus: Sphaeralcea
- Species: S. coccinea

Binomial name
- Sphaeralcea coccinea (Nutt.) Rydb.

Varieties
- S. coccinea var. coccinea; S. coccinea var. elata

Synonyms
- List: Cristaria coccinea (Nutt.) Pursh; Malva coccinea Nutt.; Malvastrum coccineum (Nutt.) A.Gray; Malveopsis coccinea (Nutt.) Kuntze; Nototriche coccinea (Nutt.) Nieuwl. & Lunell; Sida coccinea (Nutt.) DC.

= Sphaeralcea coccinea =

Scarlet globemallow

Plant species in the mallow family

Sphaeralcea coccinea, commonly known as the scarlet globemallow, scarlet mallow, cowboy's delight, prairie mallow, red false mallow, or simply as globe mallow is a perennial plant growing 10–30 cm tall from spreading rhizomes with a low habit. They have grayish stems with dense, star-shaped hairs and alternately arranged leaves. The leaf blades are 2–5 cm long, palmately shaped, and deeply cut, with 3–5 main wedge-shaped segments. The undersides of the leaves have gray hairs. The 1–2.5 cm wide flowers are reddish-orange and saucer-shaped, with 5 notched, broad petals, in small terminal clusters. It produces numerous stamen which surround the pistils as a tube. Plants flower from May to October in southern regions and May to July in northern regions. The plant produces a dry "fruit" called a schizocarp, which after maturity, breaks into roughly 10 or more seed segments.

This species is native to dry grasslands, prairies, and badlands of the Great Plains and western regions of northern North America. It thrives along roadsides in drier conditions and sandy soils. The plant releases its seeds upon being disturbed, allowing it to further spread to new areas.

== Uses ==
Scarlet globemallow is recorded with a traditional use by the people of the Blackfoot Confederacy as a cooling agent, with it being ground up or mashed into a mixture applied to wounds and burns. Additionally, while on the course of his expedition, near the Marias River, Meriwether Lewis collected a specimen of this species.

The plant can also be used today as ground-cover along roadsides and fields to prevent erosion. Due to its fast spreading nature, it can quickly spread, creating more stability in the soil.
