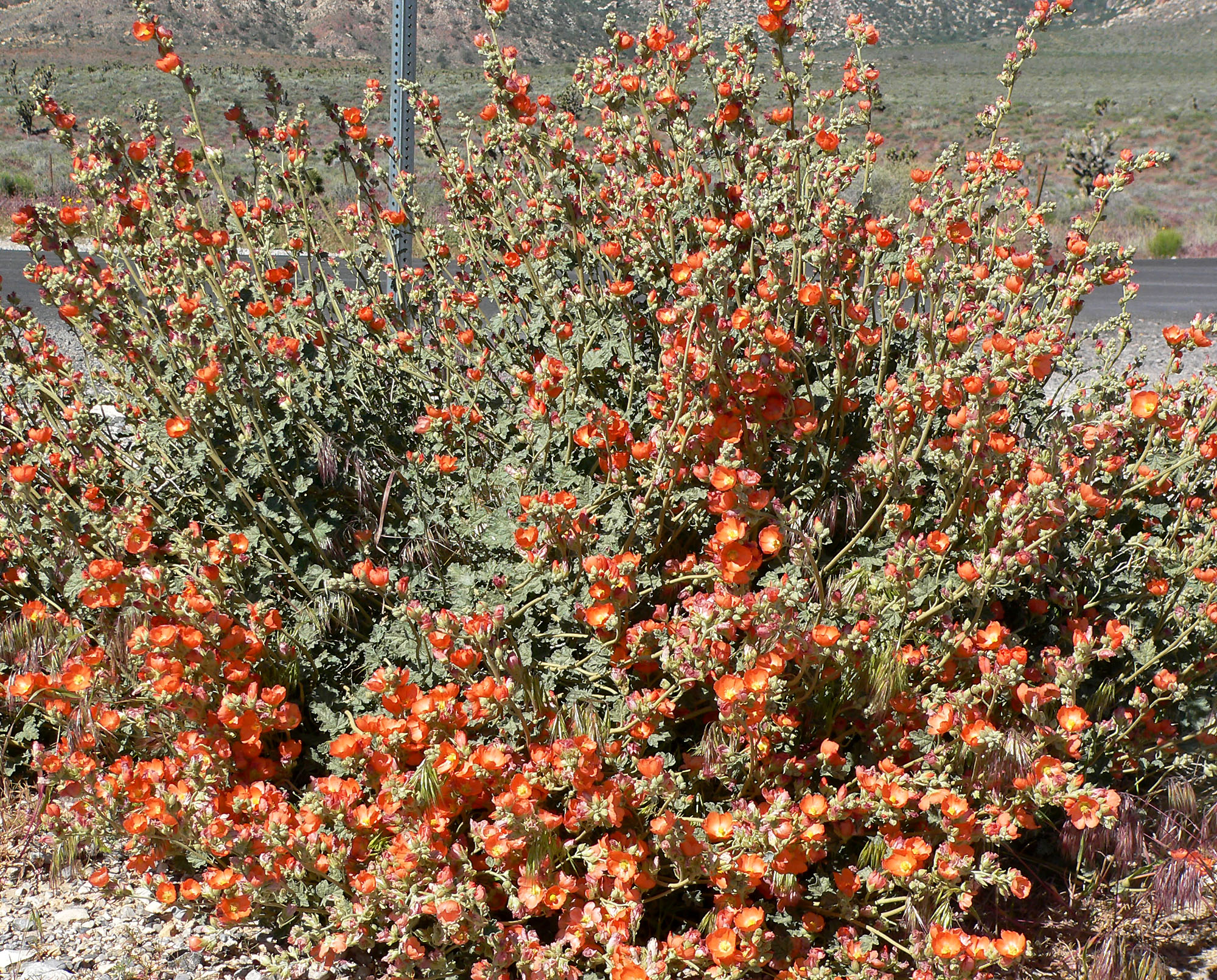
- Desert globemallow Sphaeralcea ambigua

Scientific classification
- Kingdom: Plantae
- Clade: Tracheophytes
- Clade: Angiosperms
- Clade: Eudicots
- Clade: Rosids
- Order: Malvales
- Family: Malvaceae
- Subfamily: Malvoideae
- Tribe: Malveae
- Genus: Sphaeralcea; A.St.-Hil.

Species
- 40-60, see text

Synonyms
- Sphaeroma (DC.) Schltdl.

= Sphaeralcea =

Genus of flowering plants

Sphaeralcea is a genus of flowering plants in the mallow family (Malvaceae). There are about 40-60 species, including annuals, perennials, and shrubs. Most originate in the drier regions of North America, with some known from South America. They are commonly known as globemallows, globe mallows, false mallows or falsemallows. The name of the genus is derived from the Greek words σφαῖρα (sphaira), meaning "sphere," and αλκεα (alkea), meaning "mallow."

The leaves of these plants are spirally arranged, and usually palmate or toothed. Both stems and leaves are downy. Like other Malvaceae, the flowers are saucer- or cup-shaped, with the stamens joined into a column in the center.

Sphaeralcea species are used as food plants by the larvae of some Lepidoptera species including Schinia olivacea, which has been recorded on S. lindheimeri.

== Species ==
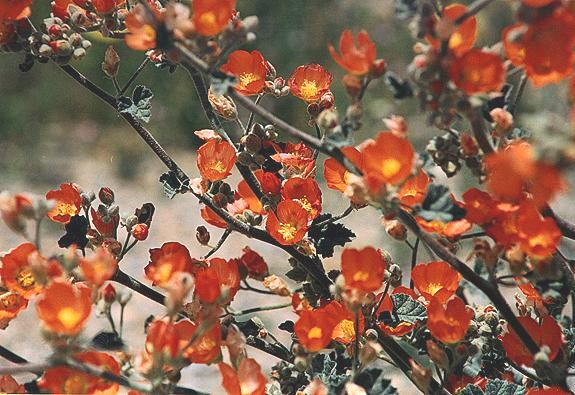
Munro's globemallow Sphaeralcea munroana

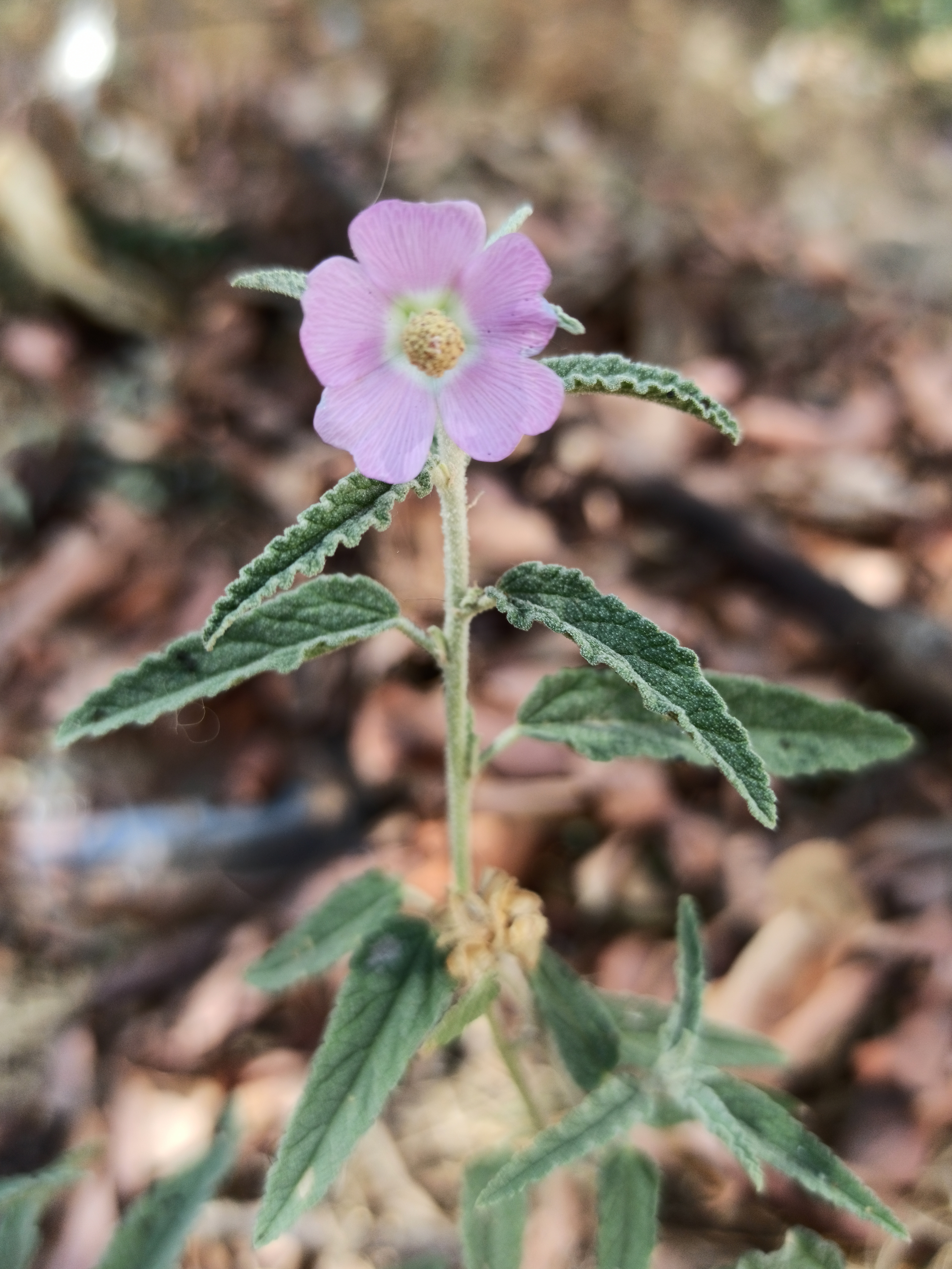
Copper globemallow Sphaeralcea angustifolia

49 species are accepted.

- Sphaeralcea ambigua A.Gray – Desert globemallow
- Sphaeralcea angustifolia (Cav.) G.Don – Copper globemallow, narrowleaf desertmallow
- Sphaeralcea australis Spegazzini - Southern globemallow
- Sphaeralcea axillaris S.Watson
- Sphaeralcea bonariensis (Cav.) Griseb. – Latin globemallow
- Sphaeralcea brevipes (Phil.) Krapov.
- Sphaeralcea caespitosa M.E.Jones – Tufted globemallow
- Sphaeralcea chenopodifolia Rodrigo
- Sphaeralcea coccinea (Nutt.) Rydb. – Scarlet globemallow, red globemallow, red falsemallow
- Sphaeralcea cordobensis Krapov.
- Sphaeralcea coulteri (S.Watson) A.Gray – Coulter's globemallow
- Sphaeralcea crispa Hook. ex Baker f.
- Sphaeralcea decipiens (A.St.-Hil. & Naudin) Krapov.
- Sphaeralcea digitata (Greene) Rydb. – Juniper globemallow, slippery globemallow
- Sphaeralcea emoryi Torr. ex A.Gray – Emory's globemallow
- Sphaeralcea endlichii Ulbr.
- Sphaeralcea fendleri A.Gray – Fendler's globemallow, thicket globemallow
- Sphaeralcea fulva Greene – desert mallow
- Sphaeralcea fumariensis (S.L.Welsh & N.D.Atwood) N.D.Atwood & S.L.Welsh
- Sphaeralcea gierischii N.D.Atwood & S.L.Welsh – Gierisch mallow
- Sphaeralcea grossulariifolia (Hook. & Arn.) Rydb. – Gooseberryleaf globemallow, currantleaf globemallow
- Sphaeralcea hainesii Brandegee
- Sphaeralcea hastulata A.Gray – Spear globemallow, spreading globemallow
- Sphaeralcea incana Torr. ex A.Gray – Gray globemallow, soft globemallow, azeentliini
- Sphaeralcea janeae (S.L.Welsh) S.L.Welsh – Jane's globemallow
- Sphaeralcea laciniata (K.Schum.) Krapov.
- Sphaeralcea laxa Wooton & Standl. – Caliche globemallow
- Sphaeralcea leptophylla (A.Gray) Rydb. – Scaly globemallow
- Sphaeralcea lindheimeri A.Gray – Woolly globemallow
- Sphaeralcea mendocina Phil.
- Sphaeralcea miniata (Cav.) Spach
- Sphaeralcea moorei (S.L.Welsh) N.D.Atwood & S.L.Welsh
- Sphaeralcea munroana (Douglas ex Lindl.) Spach ex A.Gray – Munro's globemallow, whitestem globemallow
- Sphaeralcea obtusiloba (Hook.) G.Don
- Sphaeralcea orcuttii Rose – Carrizo Creek globemallow
- Sphaeralcea palmeri Rose
- Sphaeralcea parvifolia A.Nelson – Smallflower globemallow, littleleaf globemallow
- Sphaeralcea pedatifida (A.Gray) A.Gray – Palmleaf globemallow
- Sphaeralcea philippiana Krapov.
- Sphaeralcea polychroma La Duke – Hot Springs globemallow
- Sphaeralcea procera Ced.Porter – Luna County globemallow
- Sphaeralcea psoraloides S.L.Welsh – Psoralea globemallow
- Sphaeralcea purpurata (Lindl.) Krapov.
- Sphaeralcea reflexa Fryxell, Valdés-Reyna & Villarreal
- Sphaeralcea rusbyi A.Gray – Rusby's globemallow, cutleaf globemallow
- Sphaeralcea sulphurea S.Watson
- Sphaeralcea tehuelches (Speg.) Krapov.
- Sphaeralcea velutina C.Presl
- Sphaeralcea wrightii A.Gray – Wright's globemallow

=== Formerly placed here ===
- Iliamna rivularis (Douglas) Greene (as S. acerifolia Torr. & A.Gray and S. rivularis (Douglas) Torr.)
- Phymosia umbellata (Cav.) Kearney (as S. umbellata (Cav.) G.Don)
