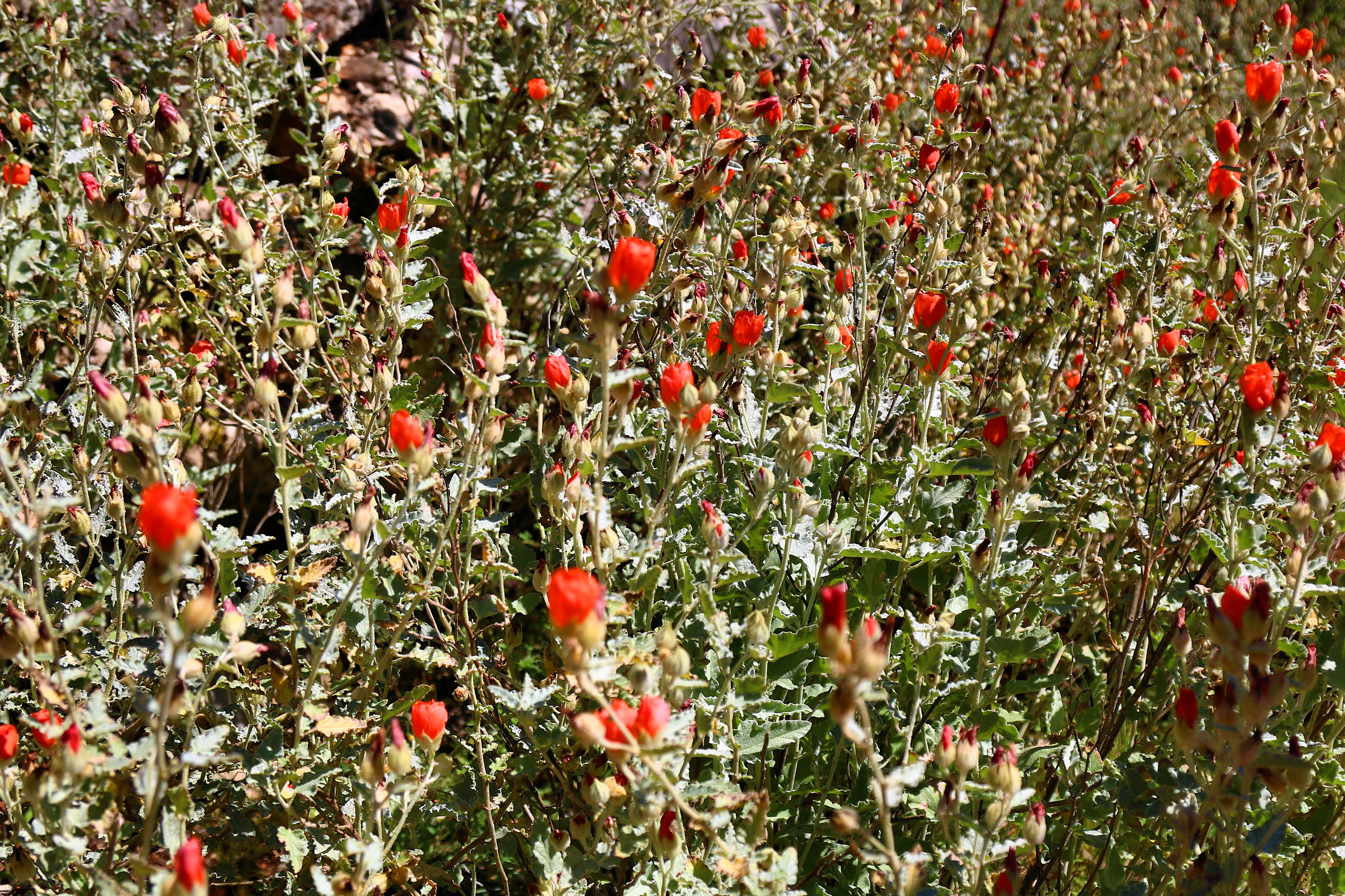

Scientific classification
- Kingdom: Plantae
- Clade: Tracheophytes
- Clade: Angiosperms
- Clade: Eudicots
- Clade: Rosids
- Order: Malvales
- Family: Malvaceae
- Genus: Sphaeralcea
- Species: S. incana

Binomial name
- Sphaeralcea incana Torr. ex A.Gray

= Sphaeralcea incana =

Species of flowering plant

Sphaeralcea incana, with the common names gray globemallow and soft globemallow, is a desert plant in the mallow family (Malvaceae).

== Distribution ==
The plant is native to Chihuahuan Desert and Sonoran Desert ecoregions of the Southwestern United States and northern Mexico. It is found in the states of Arizona, Chihuahua, New Mexico, Sonora, and Texas.

== Description ==
Sphaeralcea incana is a perennial subshrub with a large taproot. It has several to many erect stems, emerging from a stout woody crown, growing 3–6 feet (0.91–1.83 m) in height. The gray leaves are very dense with short scurfy hairs.

The flowers are a brilliant orange, appearing from June through October. There are also pink, and white, flowering forms. In some locales the plants can form 'carpets of flowers' after a heavy winter rainy season.

=== Subspecies ===
Subspecies include:

- Sphaeralcea incana ssp. cuneata — soft globemallow — endemic to New Mexico and Arizona.
- Sphaeralcea incana ssp. incana — gray globemallow.

== Uses ==
The plant's flowers are of special value to native species of bees and butterflies.

=== Medicinal plant ===
Sphaeralcea incana has been used as a medicinal plant, traditionally by Native Americans, and by others.

The Hopi peoples traditionally used the plant to treat diarrhea.

The leaves and flowers of the plant can be made into an herbal tea used for respiratory irritations and flu.

The roots and leaves are demulcent and emollient. A poultice of fresh crushed leaves has been used for skin injuries or inflammations.

=== Cultivation ===
Sphaeralcea incana is cultivated as an ornamental plant by specialty plant nurseries. It is used in native plant, water conserving, and wildlife gardens, and for natural landscaping projects.
