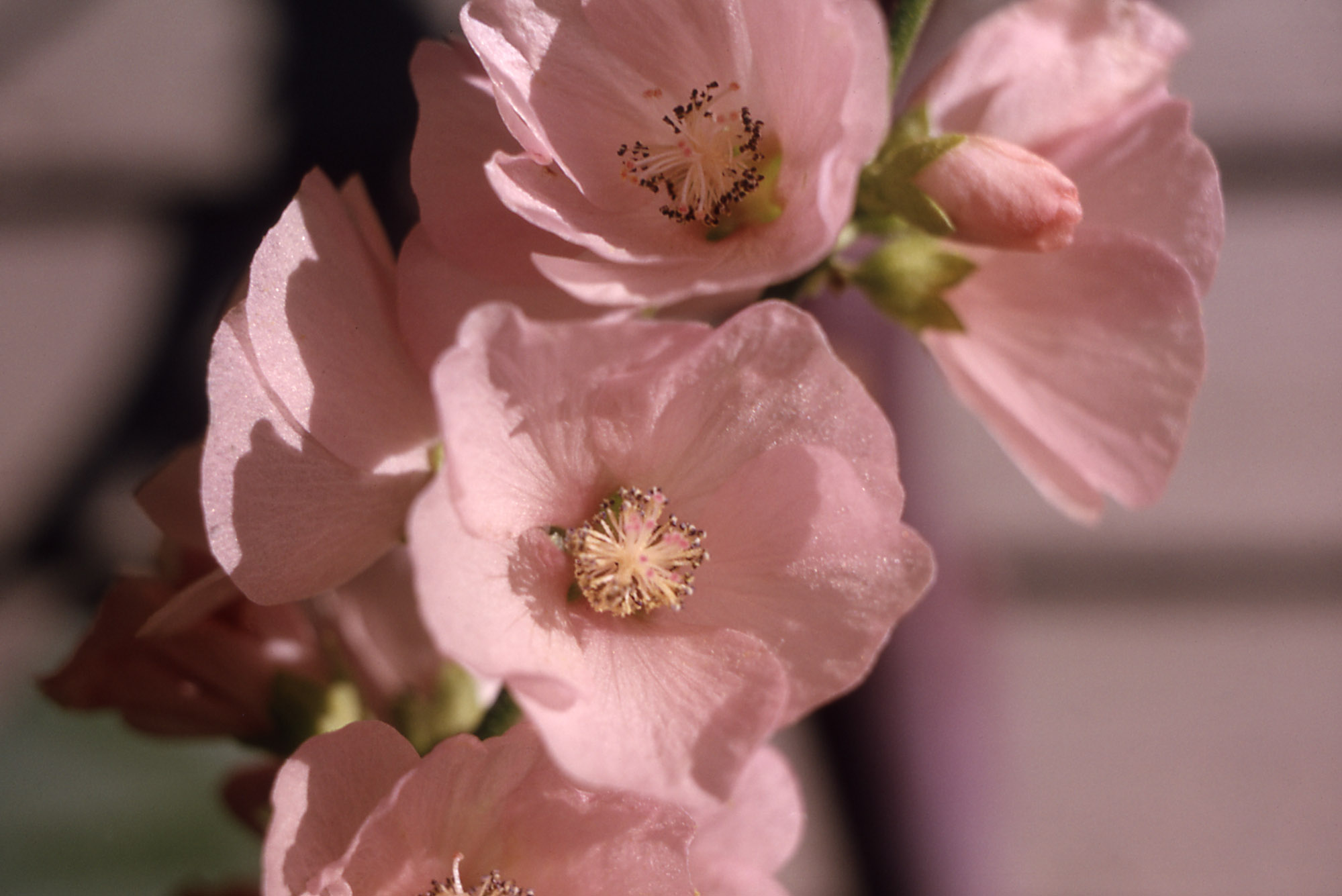

Scientific classification
- Kingdom: Plantae
- Clade: Tracheophytes
- Clade: Angiosperms
- Clade: Eudicots
- Clade: Rosids
- Order: Malvales
- Family: Malvaceae
- Genus: Iliamna
- Species: I. rivularis

Binomial name
- Iliamna rivularis (Douglas) Greene

Synonyms
- List: Iliamna acerifolia (Nutt.) Greene; Iliamna rivularis subsp. diversa (A.Nelson) Wiggins; Iliamna rivularis var. diversa (A.Nelson) C.L.Hitchc.; Malva acerifolia Nutt. ex Walp.; Malva rivularis Douglas; Phymosia acerifolia (Nutt.) Rydb.; Phymosia rivularis (Douglas) Rydb.; Sphaeralcea acerifolia Nutt.; Sphaeralcea rivularis (Douglas) Torr.; Sphaeralcea rivularis var. diversa A.Nelson; Sphaeroma rivulare (Douglas) Kuntze

= Iliamna rivularis =

Species of plant in the mallow family

Iliamna rivularis, known by the common name streambank wild hollyhock, is a perennial plant species in the family Malvaceae.

== Description ==
The plant typically grows 3 to 6 feet (0.9 to 1.8 m) tall from a woody caudex and produces dense racemes of soft lavender-pink flowers. Plants bloom from June through August. They have five- to seven-lobed, cordate leaves. Seeds have a very hard coat and can remain viable in the soil for more than 50 years; seed germination is often triggered after a wildfire.

== Distribution ==
This species is native to sunny mountain streambanks, meadows, and open forest slopes from east of the Cascade Range, from British Columbia and Alberta to Montana and south to Oregon and Colorado.

Iliamna rivularis var. rivularis, which is often called Iliamna remota and has the common name Kankakee globe-mallow, has suffered drastic population declines in the Eastern United States, largely from an altered fire regimen caused by long-term fire suppression which has changed the forest canopy structure. Shading limits plant growth and seed germination and the seeds germinate after scarification by fire.
