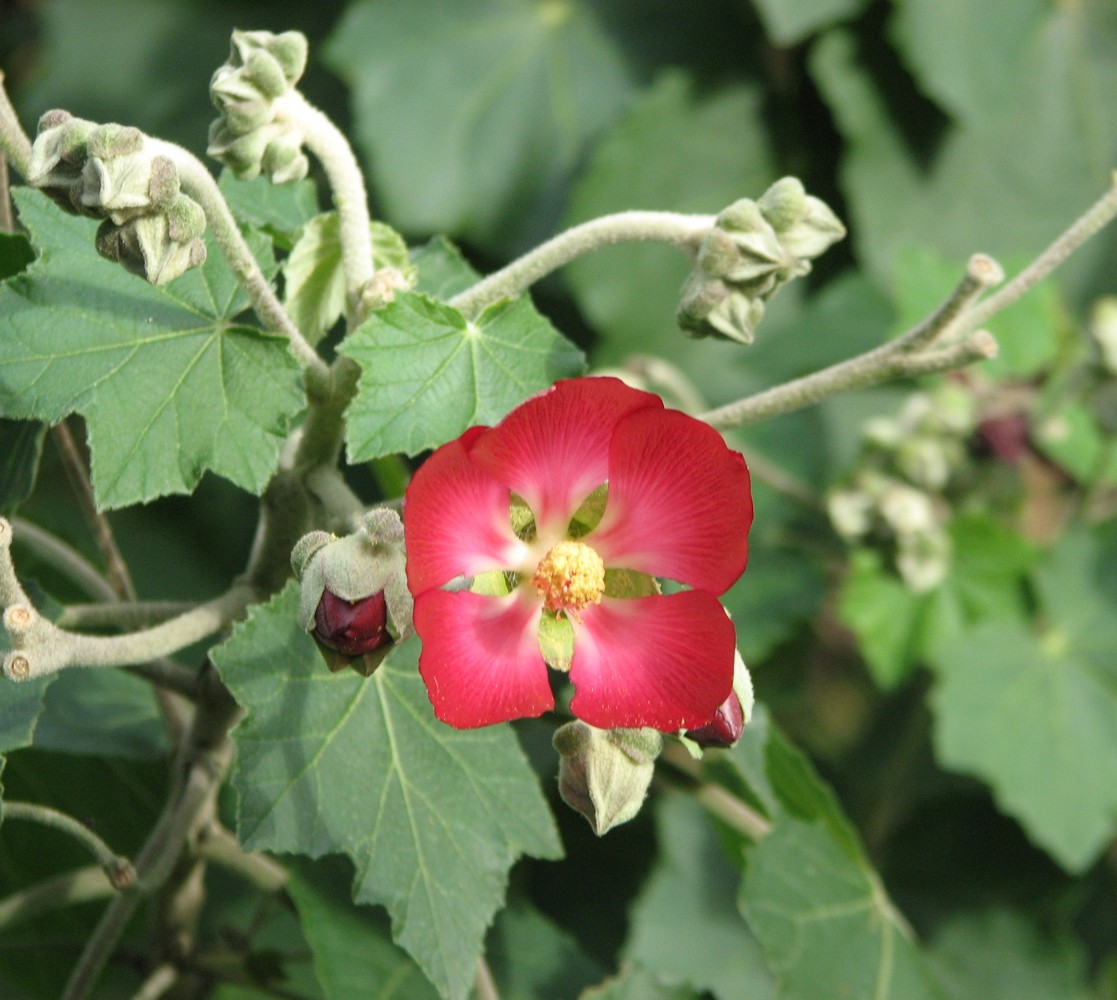
- Phymosia umbellata

Scientific classification
- Kingdom: Plantae
- Clade: Tracheophytes
- Clade: Angiosperms
- Clade: Eudicots
- Clade: Rosids
- Order: Malvales
- Family: Malvaceae
- Subfamily: Malvoideae
- Tribe: Malveae
- Genus: Phymosia; Desv.

Synonyms
- Meliphlea Zucc.

= Phymosia =

Genus of flowering plants

Phymosia is a genus of flowering plants in the family Malvaceae. It includes five species native to Mexico, Guatemala, El Salvador, Hispaniola, and the Bahamas.

== Species ==
Five species are accepted.

- Phymosia abutiloides (L.) Desv. ex Ham.
- Phymosia anomala Fryxell
- Phymosia crenulata (Brandegee) Fryxell
- Phymosia floribunda (Schltdl.) Fryxell
- Phymosia pauciflora (Baker f.) Fryxell
- Phymosia rosea (DC.) Kearney – El Salvador, Guatemala and Mexico
- Phymosia rzedowskii Fryxell
- Phymosia umbellata (Cav.) Kearney – Mexico
