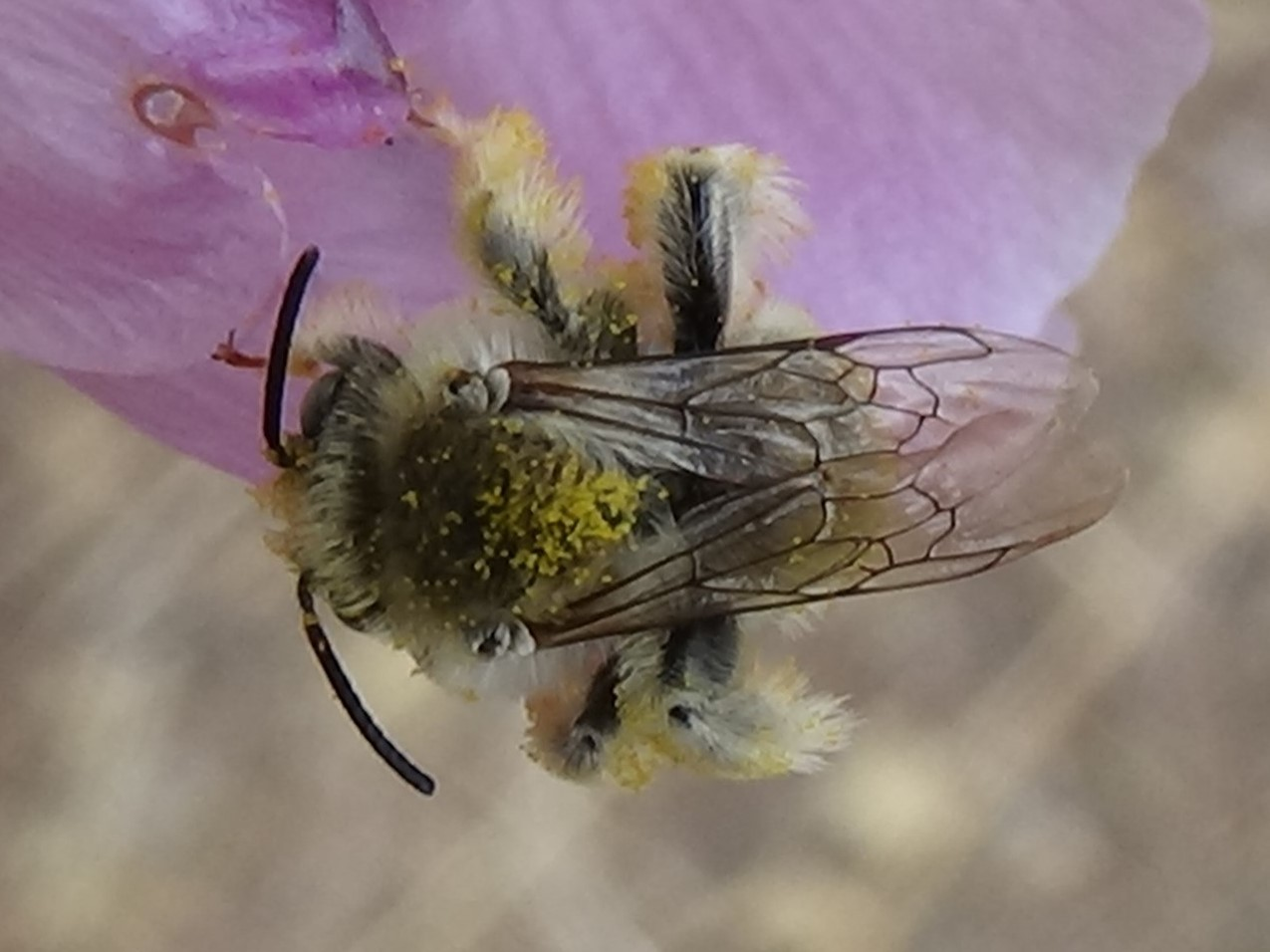

Scientific classification
- Kingdom: Animalia
- Phylum: Arthropoda
- Clade: Pancrustacea
- Class: Insecta
- Order: Hymenoptera
- Family: Apidae
- Tribe: Emphorini
- Genus: Diadasia
- Species: D. ochracea

Binomial name
- Diadasia ochracea (Cockerell, 1903)

= Diadasia ochracea =

Species of bee

Diadasia ochracea, commonly known as the ochraceous chimney bee, is a species of solitary bee in the family Apinae, tribe Emphorini. It is native to North America and middle American, including the southwestern United States, Mexico, and Manitoba, Canada. The species is primarily oligolectic, specializing in pollen collection from plants in the mallow family (Malvaceae), particularly Sphaeralcea species.

== Taxonomy ==
Diadasia ochracea was originally described by Cockerell in 1903 as Dasiapis ochracea. Synonyms include Dasiapis ochracea and Diadasia blaisdelli.It is classified in the subgenus Dasiapis, which includes small-to moderate-sized, oligolectic species specializing in Malvaceae pollen.

== Description ==
Members of Diadasia ochracea are medium-small bees with lush, pale-gold or ochraceous hairs. Females have conspicuous blond scopal hairs on their hind legs for pollen collection, with additional brushes on their front-leg tibiae. The inner hind tibia may have black or dark reddish-orange hairs. Males have a pale yellow clypeus and occasionally pale labrum. Wings are light brown with brown veins. Eyes are green or blue-green. Adult females are approximately 8 mm long, while males are about 7 mm.

Distinctive morphological features include:

- Hair pattern and coloration on thorax and abdomen
- Antennal and leg structure
- Size range
- Unique mandible and genitalia features for species identification

These traits differentiate D. ochracea from other Dasiapis species such as D. diminuta, D. rinconis, and D. tropicalis.

== Distribution and habitat ==
Diadasia ochracea occurs from Texas through the southwestern United States, west to California and Washington, and south into Puebla, Mexico. It has also been recorded in southern Manitoba, Canada. It inhabits well-vegetated deserts, desert-grasslands, arid grasslands, and areas with hard-packed or sandy soils. The species is common in the Lower Rio Grande Valley during spring and fall.

== Diet and floral associations ==
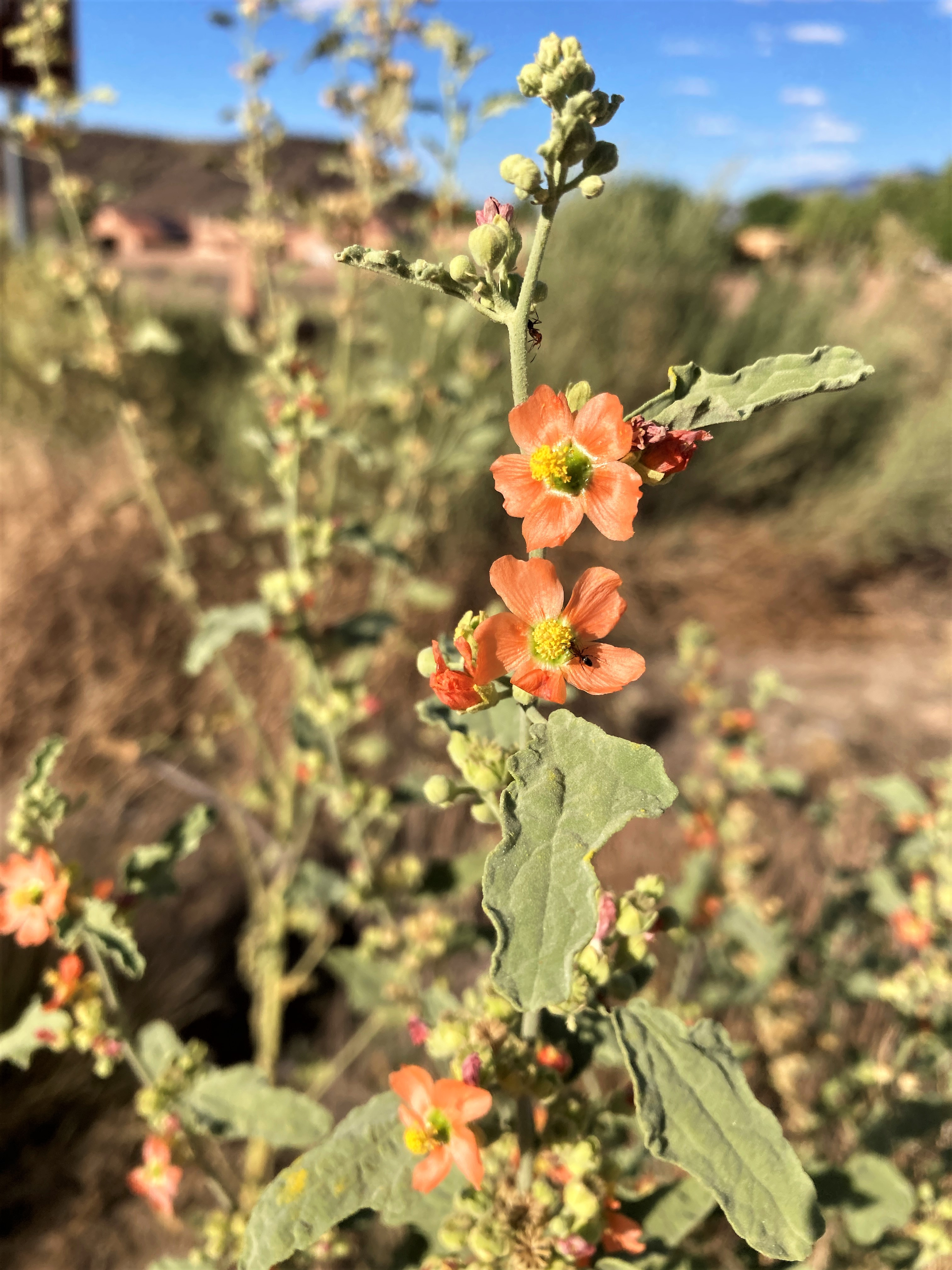
Genus Sphaeralcea

The species is oligolectic on Malvaceae, especially Sphaeralcea species. Other pollen hosts include Malvastrum americanum, Abutilon hypolecum, and Herissantia crispa. Nectar is collected from Cirsium taxanum (Texas thistle) and Ruellia nudiflora var. runyonii (wild petunia). Both males and females primarily forage on Malvaceae, rarely visiting other plants families.

== Nesting and behavior ==
Diadasia ochracea is a solitary ground-nesting bee. Females construct shallow vertical burrows in the soil, often forming small chimney-shaped turrets at the entrances, giving the common name "chimney bee." Nests may be aggregated in areas with suitable soil. The species overwinters as a mature larva.

== Ecology ==
As an oligolectic pollinator, D. ochracea plays a specialist role in pollinating Malvaceae plants. Studies in the Mojave Desert have identified this species as specializing on Spheralcea ambigua pollen. Its abundance is influenced not only by floral availability but also by soil-nesting conditions and floral resources quality. No evidence suggests evolutionary host switching at the family level; Malvaceae specialization appears stable over evolutionary time within the Emphorini tribe.
