= Ptilothrix tricolor =

Scientific classification
- Kingdom: Animalia
- Phylum: Arthropoda
- Clade: Pancrustacea
- Class: Insecta
- Order: Hymenoptera
- Family: Apidae
- Genus: Ptilothrix
- Species: P. tricolor

Binomial name
- Ptilothrix tricolor (Friese, 1906)

Synonyms
- Ancyloscelis tricolor Friese, 1906

Species of insect

Ptilothrix tricolor is a species of solitary bee in the genus Ptilothrix. Like other members of the genus, it is a ground-nesting bee exhibiting morphological and ecological adaptations for pollen collection.

== Taxonomy and nomenclature ==
The species was described by the German entomologist Heinrich Friese in the early 20th century as part of his contributions to South American bee taxonomy. The specific epithet tricolor ("three-coloured") likely refers to a pattern in the integument or pubescence, similar to other insect names with this epithet, though the original Latin diagnosis has not been widely republished in online sources.

== Description ==
Members of the genus Ptilothrix are robust, medium-sized bees with a strong body form typical of chimney or turret bees. Their hind legs have scopae, dense, long hairs used for collecting pollen.

Identification of this species compared to other Argentine Ptilothrix often relies on detailed examination of integument coloration patterns, setal distribution, wing venation, and genitalia structure, usually requiring examination under magnification and comparison with type specimens and keys.

== Distribution and habitat ==
Specimen records in global biodiversity databases indicate that Ptilothrix tricolor has been collected in Argentina, consistent with the predominantly South American distribution of many Ptilothrix species. Like other Ptilothrix bees, it inhabits open areas with hard-packed soils suitable for nesting and floral resources from preferred plant families. Members of this genus are known from a wide range of habitats across the Americas.

== Biology and behaviour ==
As with related Ptilothrix species, P. tricolor is solitary: each female constructs and provisions her own nest without worker castes. Nests are typically excavated in soil, and females provision brood cells with pollen and nectar.

Bees in the tribe Emphorini often exhibit pollen specialization (oligolecty), visiting a narrow range of host plants — particularly in the families Malvaceae, Convolvulaceae, Onagraceae, Cactaceae, and Asteraceae, although specific host associations for P. tricolor have not been published.

== Similar species ==
Within the genus Ptilothrix, many species are superficially similar and require careful taxonomic work to differentiate:

- Ptilothrix bombiformis, a North/Central American species known as the hibiscus bee, with distinctive pale pubescence on the head and mesosoma.
- Ptilothrix sumichrasti and others — South American Ptilothrix species that also nests in soil with turret entrances.

Comparisons between species often use coloration, body proportions, and male genitalia in taxonomic keys.
