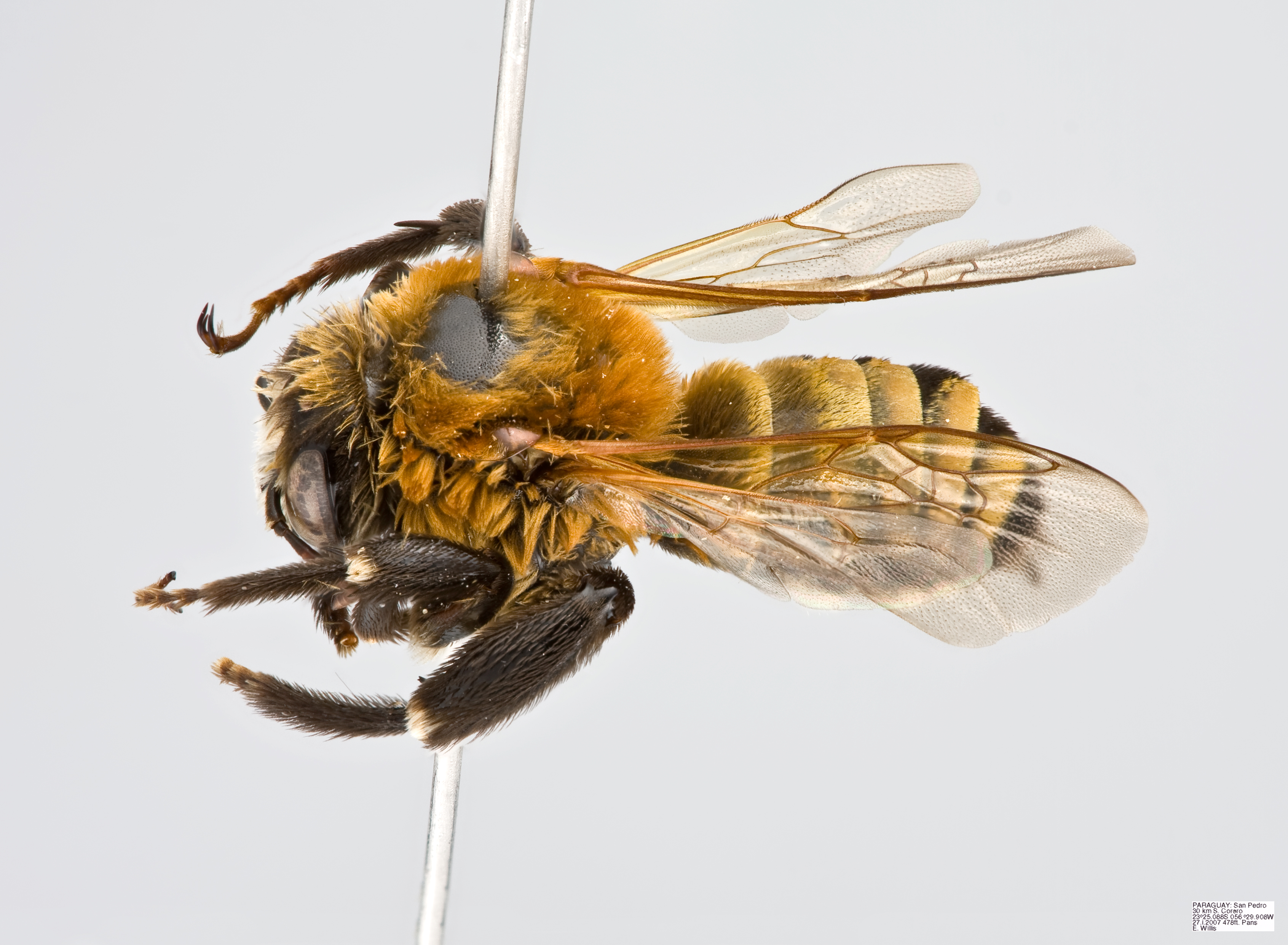
- P. relata male

Scientific classification
- Kingdom: Animalia
- Phylum: Arthropoda
- Clade: Pancrustacea
- Class: Insecta
- Order: Hymenoptera
- Family: Apidae
- Tribe: Emphorini
- Genus: Ptilothrix; Smith, 1853.

= Ptilothrix =

Genus of bees

Ptilothrix is a genus within the tribe Emphorini of the family Apidae (bumblebees, euglossines, honeybees, stingless bees). Bees of this genus can range from 7 to 15 mm (0.28 to 0.59 in). Ptilothrix species are solitary, ground-nesting bees. These bees have especially prominent hairs in the scopae of their hind legs, to help gather pollen to provision their nests. Ptilothrix species specialize on certain families of plants for their pollen, including the families Malvaceae, Convolvulaceae, Onagraceae, Cactaceae, Pontederiaceae, and Asteraceae. The genus is found in the New World, with species ranging across the Americas.

== Species ==
The genus contains these species:

- Ptilothrix albidohirta
- Ptilothrix bombiformis (hibiscus bee, rose-mallow bee, eastern digger bee)
- Ptilothrix chacoensis
- Ptilothrix chiricahua (2023)
- Ptilothrix concolor
- Ptilothrix corrientium
- Ptilothrix fructifera
- Ptilothrix fuliginosa
- Ptilothrix heterochroa
- Ptilothrix lynchii
- Ptilothrix nemoralis
- Ptilothrix nigerrima
- Ptilothrix plumata
- Ptilothrix relata
- Ptilothrix scalaris
- Ptilothrix sumichrasti
- Ptilothrix tricolor
- Ptilothrix vulpihirta
- Ptilothrix zacateca (2023)

== Life History ==
Bees of the genus Ptilothrix are solitary. Unlike honeybees or other eusocial bee species, the members of Ptilothrix do not form a hive or have division of labor of individuals. Females nest individually in hard-packed soil and oviposit eggs into brood cells provisioned with masses of pollen and nectar, which provide nutrients for their offspring. The adults emerge from the nest, which is sometimes covered with a layer of soil to prevent predation. Predation in the larval stage is most commonly from parasitoid wasps, fire ants, and assassin flies, whose life cycles are synchronized with P. plumata. Due to the threat of predators and adverse environmental conditions, pupae can exhibit pupal diapause, or the ability to delay maturation until favorable environmental conditions occur. Some species will build their nests in dense aggregations in the same area.

Males wait for females at flowers, where they attempt to mate. Multiple studies have suggested that male aggression and mating behavior at flowers may contribute more to pollination of their host flowers than female visitation. One study found that while males accounted for 5% of pollen visits to Hibiscus flowers, they contributed over 20% of pollen grains deposited on anthers. Therefore, male aggression contributes to increased pollination and seed set among Hibiscus.

== Morphology ==
Bees of this genus are large and can range from 7 to 15 mm (0.28 to 0.59 in).

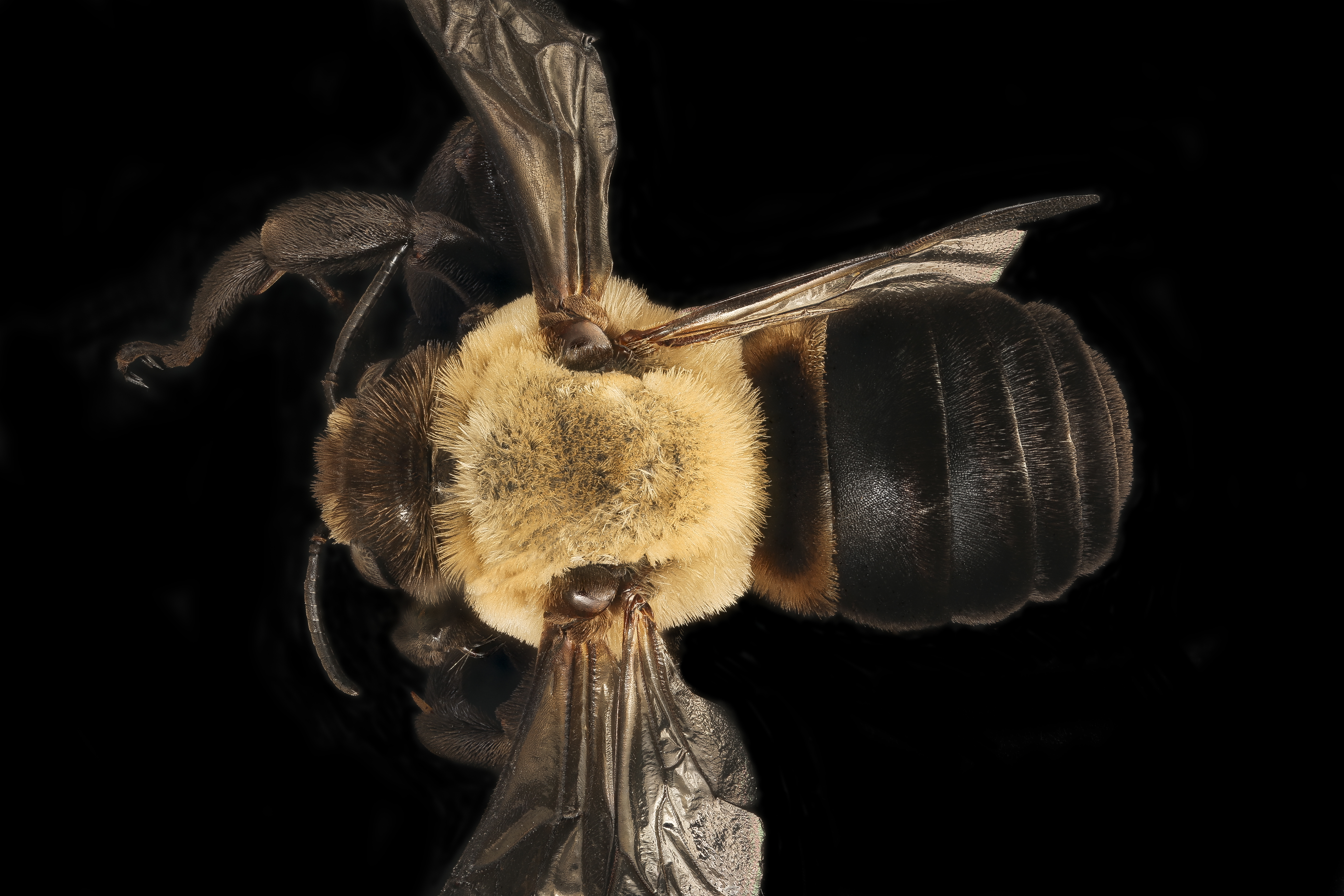
Ptilothrix bombiformis male. As the species name suggests, P. bombiformis look similar to Bombus species.

The coarse and long-haired scopae of the genus Ptilothrix aid them in collecting large-grained pollen, such as is found in the family Malvaceae. This may allow Ptilothrix species to thrive alongside other introduced species, such as honeybees, as it may reduce interspecific competition for pollen resources. Scopae are thought to have advantages in evapotranspiration and reflecting sunlight to keep bees cool in hot, arid environments in contrast to other members in the Apidae, such as honeybees and bumblebees, that have hairless pollen baskets (corbiculae) to carry their pollen on their legs. Ptilothrix species are able to walk on the surface of water while being supported by their legs.

== Range ==
Species of this genus are found in North and South America. Ptilothrix bombiformis is the only species east of the Mississippi River in North America. As with most bee taxa, they are most abundant at latitudes outside of the tropics.

== Nest construction ==
Ptilothrix species are also referred to as the chimney bees, referring to the small chimney or turret of the nest entrance that can be seen on the soil surface. While specific nesting behavior varies by species, female members of this genus create ground nests in hard-packed soil. Nests can contain one to many brood cells, and in most species, the female transports water to her nesting site to soften the soil for excavation. The female bee then digs a single-celled or multi-celled burrow, and lines the interior with wax or feces for support.

A comprehensive comparison of nest construction and behavior between species can be found in Rust (1980) and Martins et al. (1996). For P. bombiformis populations, nest survivorship averages about 57% of all nests created in a given season. The major causes of mortality in these populations appeared to be fungal pathogens or failure of the egg to hatch. Among P. plumata in Brazil, nest mortality rates of about 88% occur among nests that are completed in a season. Predation by fire ants and other parasites is cited as the most likely cause. Females can make multiple nests and tend to avoid making nests in the rainy season.

Females of this genus have evolved multiple behaviors to avoid predation. P. plumata showed a delayed dormancy in nests, with a bimodal presence of hatching existing in nests. This dormancy is in response to environmental conditions and predation. If a female noticed parasites or predators while constructing or visiting a nest, she would cover the nest or shake her body at the entrance to protect it. Females have also been observed creating nests and abandoning construction before nests are complete.

== Pollination ==
Bees exhibit a variety of behaviors for gathering pollen, with oligolecty being the typical behavior in Ptilothrix species. P. plumata, for example, is oligolectic towards pollen from plants in the family Malvaceae, with aroun 90% of pollen grains found in P. plumata nests from Pavonia species.

Just because a bee is oligolectic to a particular plant does not mean that it is the plant's main pollinator. Not surprisingly, the effectiveness of oligoleges as pollinators depends on the species. In some cases where pollen grains are large, they are more effectively carried by the specialist Ptilothrix. In other cases, generalist bees are just as, if not more, effective; pollination effectiveness may have less to do with female pollen provisioning and more to do with male mating competition. In some cases, generalist Bombus species are more effective pollinators of Malvaceae flowers than the specialist P. bombiformis. Also, it may not be in the specialist's best interest to be an efficient pollinator, since they typically want to provision as much pollen as possible in their nests and not lose it brushing up against a flower.
