= Ptilothrix chiricahua =

Scientific classification
- Kingdom: Animalia
- Phylum: Arthropoda
- Class: Insecta
- Order: Hymenoptera
- Family: Apidae
- Genus: Ptilothrix
- Species: P. chiricahua

Binomial name
- Ptilothrix chiricahua Flórez-Gómez & Danforth, 2023

Species of bee

Ptilothrix chiricahua is a species of solitary ground-nesting bee. It was described in 2023. The holotype was collected in 2002 in New Mexico from a flower in the genus Kallstroemia. Like other Ptilothrix bees, they are noted for their ability to walk on water. They do this to retrieve water to soften the ground for nest excavation.

== Description ==
Ptilothrix chiricahua is 8 to 11 mm in length, i.e. slightly smaller than a European honeybee worker (11–12 mm). It has striking, marbled, steel gray-blue eyes that are topped by shiny black bald patches on the head. This bare ocellocular region also occurs in the most similar Ptilothrix species, but this region is smoothest in P. chiricahua and appears heavily punctured in other species. In P. chiricahua, there are only a few punctures near the edge abutting the eye.

The bee has yellowish to white appressed (lying flat rather than bushy) hairs on their legs, head, thorax, and forming a stripe at the bottom (apical end) of each of the large first four segments (T1-T4) of the metasoma. The final segments (T3-T5) have short black hairs. In most individuals, the top of the thorax has rust-colored hair rather than yellowish.

== Range ==
Ptilothrix chiricahua is restricted to the Chihuahuan desert region: southern New Mexico, southern Arizona, western Texas, and northern Mexico including Sonora.

== Habitat ==
This bee is found in mixed desert grasslands in the Chihuahuan desert.

== Ecology ==
It is frequently found collecting pollen from Kallstroemia grandiflora, and based on examination of pollen found on this animal, it is likely a specialist of this flower species, although there are reports that this species also visits introduced cotton flowers (Gossypium). The flight time is late summer to fall, corresponding with the bloom of K. grandiflora.

== Etymology ==
The species epithet chiricahua is for "the Chiricahua Apache people whose historical homeland encompasses the area where this bee now occurs."

== Taxonomy ==
Until 2023, this species was considered to be part of Ptilothrix sumichrasti, but taxonomic revision split P. sumichrasti into P. chiricahua, P. zacateca, and P. sumichrasti. P. sumichrasti occurs in southern Mexico and Guatemala.
