= H. crispa =

H. crispa may refer to:

- Helvella crispa, a fungus species
- Hennedya crispa, an alga species in the genus Hennedya
- Herissantia crispa, a flowering plant species
- Heteractis crispa, a sea anemone species

== See also ==
- Crispa (disambiguation)
