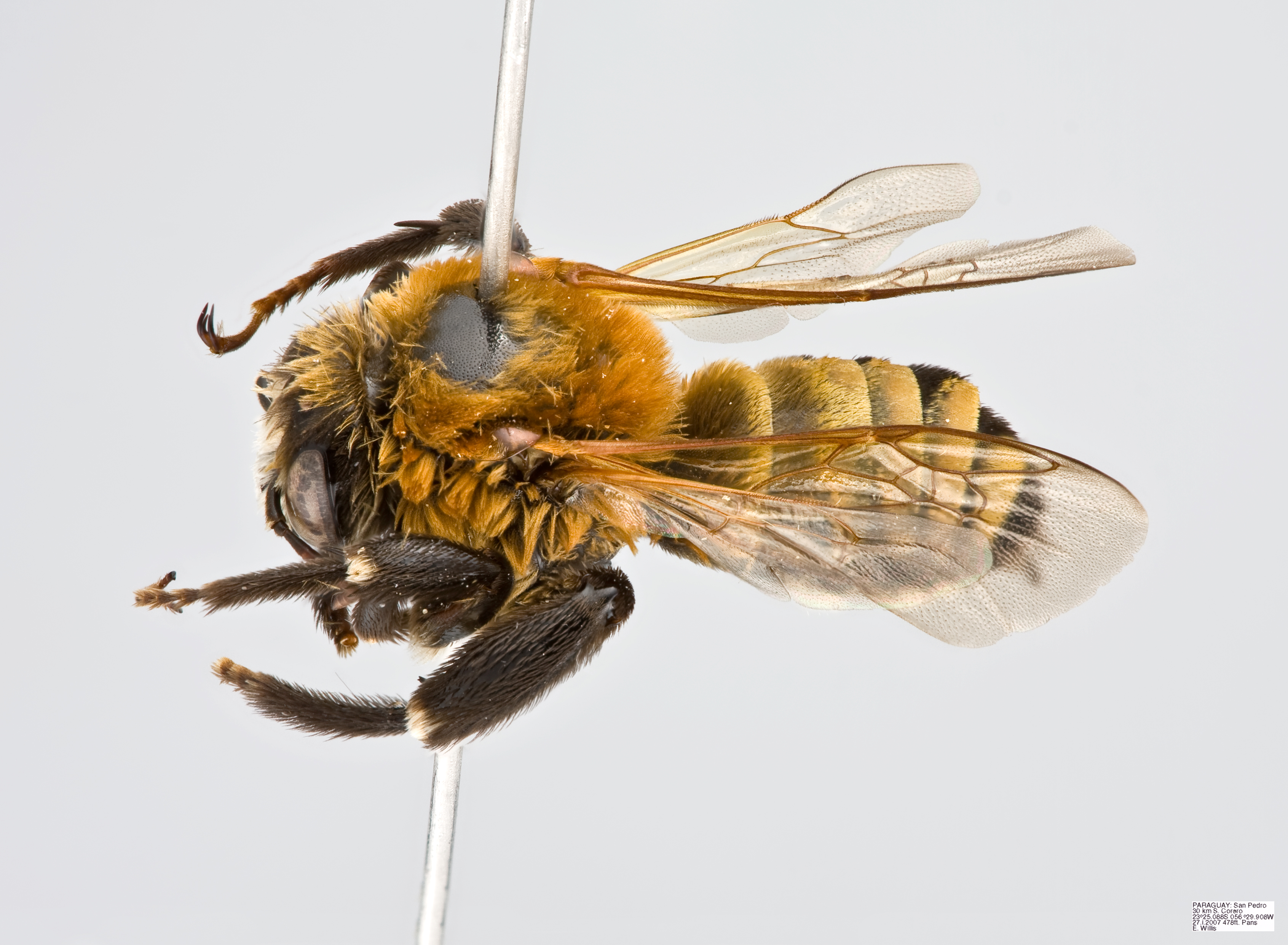
- P. relata male

Scientific classification
- Domain: Eukaryota
- Kingdom: Animalia
- Phylum: Arthropoda
- Class: Insecta
- Order: Hymenoptera
- Family: Apidae
- Genus: Ptilothrix
- Species: P. relata

Binomial name
- Ptilothrix relata (Holmberg, 1903)

= Ptilothrix relata =

Species of bee

Ptilothrix relata is a species of chimney bee in the family Apidae. It is found in South America.
