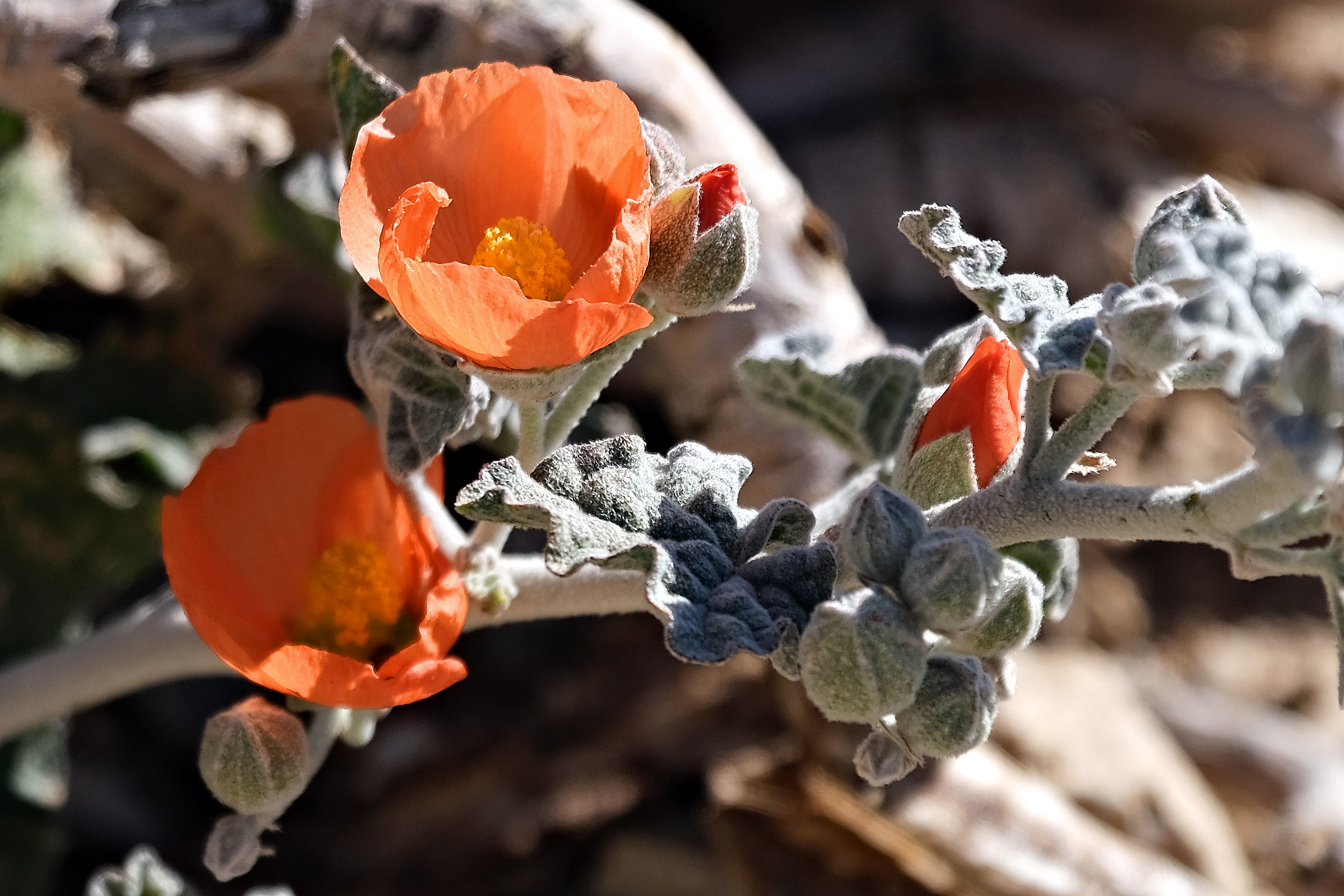
- Desert globemallow Sphaeralcea ambigua var. ambigua

Scientific classification
- Kingdom: Plantae
- Clade: Tracheophytes
- Clade: Angiosperms
- Clade: Eudicots
- Clade: Rosids
- Order: Malvales
- Family: Malvaceae
- Genus: Sphaeralcea
- Species: S. ambigua

Binomial name
- Sphaeralcea ambigua A.Gray

= Sphaeralcea ambigua =

Desert globemallow

Species of flowering plant

Sphaeralcea ambigua is a species of flowering plant commonly known as desert globemallow or apricot mallow, for its predominantly orange blooms. It has fuzzy, grey-green leaves. It is a member of the genus Sphaeralcea in the mallow family (Malvaceae).

It is a perennial shrub native to the Southwestern United States and northwest Mexico. S. ambigua is a prevalent species in desert habitat and helps provide food and habitat for other species

One of its main uses is in native, pollinator, or drought-tolerant gardens, but it is also used by the Shoshoni peoples as a medicinal plant and as a buffer against invasive species.

== Description ==
Sphaeralcea ambigua grows to 3 ft (0.91 m) in height and spreads to 2–3 ft (0.61–0.91 m) in width. The leaves (see image) are fuzzy with white hairs on both sides, lobed, palmately veined, and on long stems, the number of which increases with age. The fruit is a brown capsule containing numerous seeds, first quite spherical as implied by the genus name, later flattening to a disk. The flowers are bowl-shaped, five-petaled, apricot to orange in color (although morphs may be white or light pink), and blooming in the spring.

S. ambigua is also a larval host to several species of butterflies, such as the common checkered skipper, northern white skipper, painted lady, small checkered skipper, and West Coast lady.

=== Varieties ===
S. ambigua A. Gray has eight or nine named varieties:

- S. a. var. ambigua
- S. a. var. aculeata Jeps. (synonym for S. a. var. ambigua)
- S. a. var. rosacea (Munz & I.M. Johnst.) Kearney
- S. a. var. rugosa (Kearney) Kearney

== Habitat ==
=== Native habitat ===
Desert globemallow is native to parts of California, Nevada, Utah, Arizona, and New Mexico in the United States and Sonora and Baja California in northwest Mexico. It grows well in alkaline soils, both sandy and clay, usually in the company of creosote bush scrub and desert chaparral habitats, at 150–2,500 m (490–8,200 ft) in elevation. It is found in the Mojave, Great Basin, and Sonoran desert ecoregions.

=== Pollinators ===
Numerous bee pollinators visit this flower. The solitary ground-dwelling bee Diadasia ochracea is a specialist pollinator of this mallow.

=== Cultivation ===
S. ambigua is cultivated as an ornamental plant by specialty plant nurseries for use in desert and drought-tolerant gardens, and a native plant its desert region's natural landscaping and habitat restoration projects. It requires full sun and can do well with natural rainfall, although supplemental watering increases flowering. Sandy, desert soil with good drainage is preferred, but it is tolerant of some clay. It is winter hardy in USDA Zones 6–10, withstanding temperatures as low as -10°F. General maintenance is low. Plants may be periodically cut back to maintain a vegetative look. Propagation is easy by seed, but tricky by vegetative cuttings.

== Uses ==
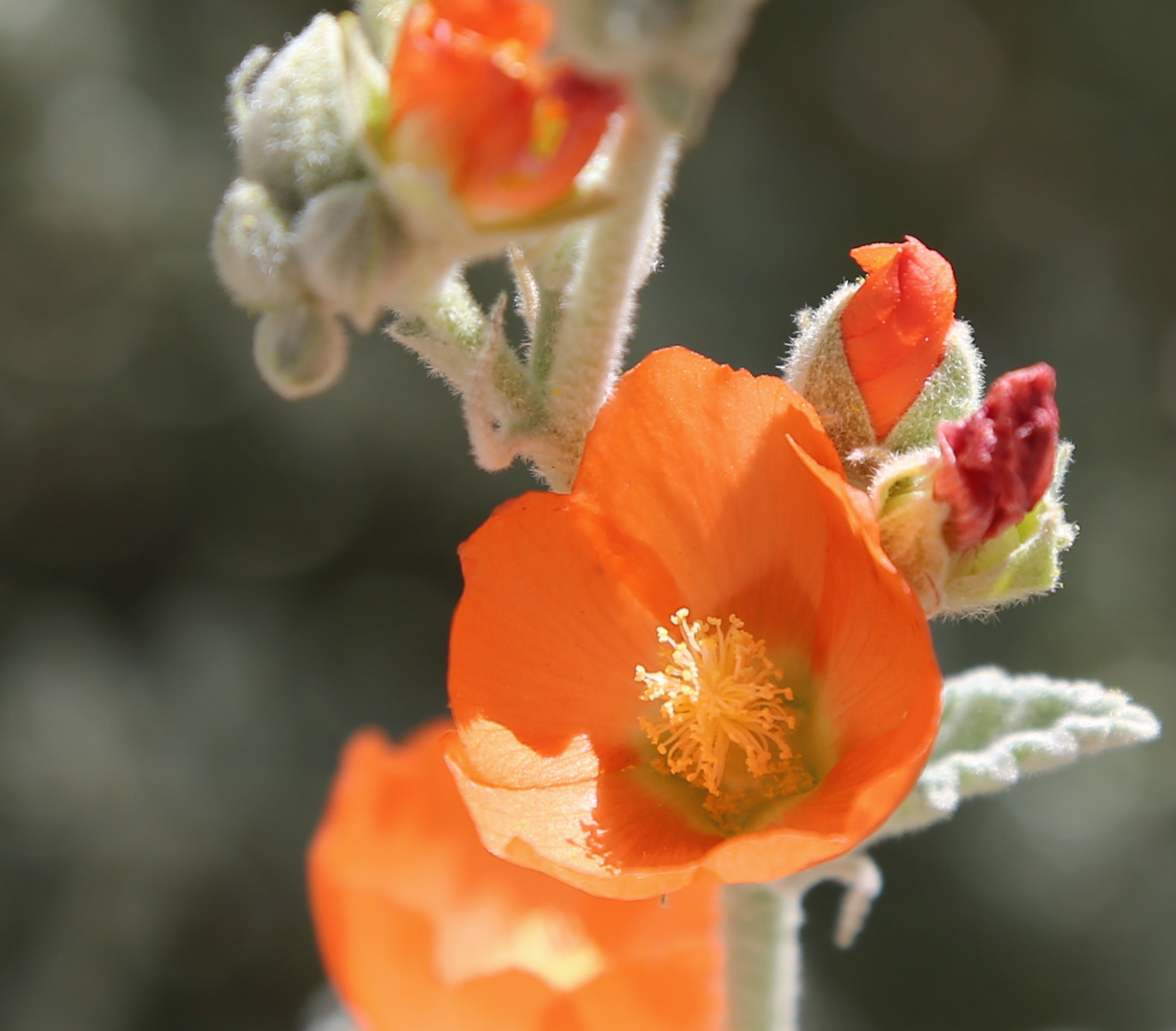
Apricot mallow flower closeup

=== Native peoples use ===
The plant is used by members of the Shoshoni tribe of Native Americans, as well as other indigenous people and settlers in the region, as a food source and medicinal plant.

=== Against invasive species ===
S. ambigua has been proven as a good competitor of invasive species (such as cheatgrass), where it is a native plant. This is partially due to globemallow being a relatively fast grower with widespread populations.
