= Melitoma marginella =

Scientific classification
- Domain: Eukaryota
- Kingdom: Animalia
- Phylum: Arthropoda
- Class: Insecta
- Order: Hymenoptera
- Family: Apidae
- Genus: Melitoma
- Species: M. marginella

Binomial name
- Melitoma marginella (Cresson, 1872)

Species of bee

Melitoma marginella is a species of chimney bee in the family Apidae. It is found in Central America and North America.
