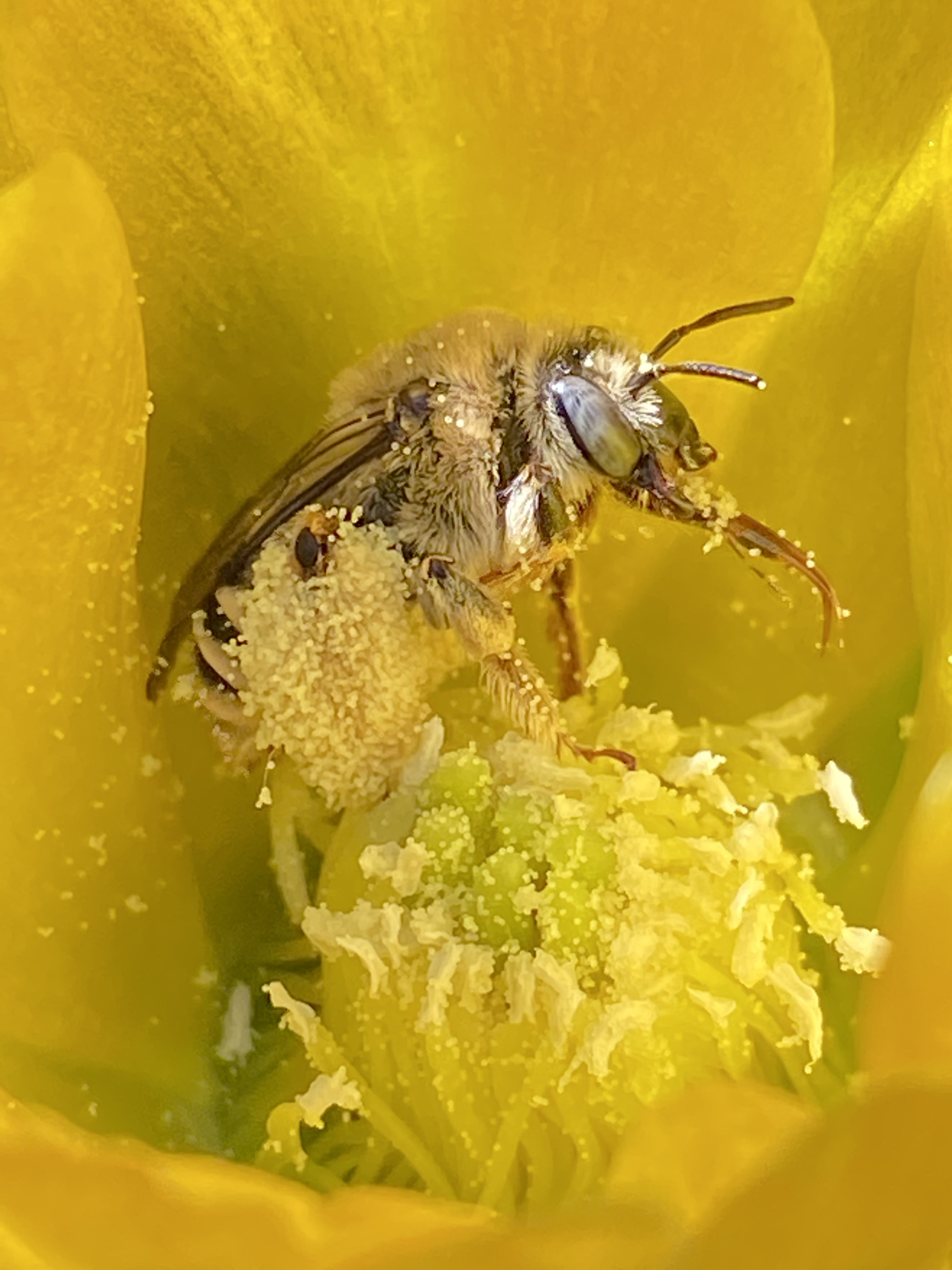
- Diadasia bee on opuntia blossom

Scientific classification
- Kingdom: Animalia
- Phylum: Arthropoda
- Clade: Pancrustacea
- Class: Insecta
- Order: Hymenoptera
- Family: Apidae
- Tribe: Emphorini
- Genus: Diadasia; Patton, 1879

= Diadasia =

Genus of bees

Diadasia is a genus of bees in the family Apidae. Its species are oligolectic, specialized on a relatively small number of plant species.

Their host plants include asters, bindweeds, cacti, mallows, and willowherbs, although mallows are the most common and likely ancestral host plant for the whole genus. Its tribe is Emphorini. In the Sonoran Desert, Diadasia rinconis is considered the "cactus bee" as it feeds almost exclusively on a number of Sonoran Desert cactus species, its life cycle revolving around the flowering of the native species of cacti.

Members of this genus are often attacked by a variety of parasitoids from the families Bombyliidae, Mutillidae, Ripiphoridae and Meloidae.

== Species ==
These 42 species belong to the genus Diadasia.

- Diadasia afflicta (Cresson, 1878)
- Diadasia afflictula Cockerell, 1910
- Diadasia albovestita Provancher, 1896
- Diadasia andina (Holmberg, 1903)
- Diadasia angusticeps Timberlake, 1939
- Diadasia australis (Cresson, 1878)
- Diadasia baeri (Vachal, 1904)
- Diadasia baraderensis (Holmberg, 1903)
- Diadasia bituberculata (Cresson, 1878)
- Diadasia bosqi (Moure, 1947)
- Diadasia chilensis (Spinola, 1851)
- Diadasia consociata Timberlake, 1939
- Diadasia diminuta (Cresson, 1878) (globe mallow bee)
- Diadasia distinguenda (Spinola, 1851)
- Diadasia enavata (Cresson, 1872) (sunflower chimney bee)
- Diadasia friesei Cockerell, 1898
- Diadasia hirta (Jörgensen, 1912)
- Diadasia knabiana Cockerell, 1917
- Diadasia laticauda Cockerell, 1905
- Diadasia lutzi Cockerell, 1924
- Diadasia lynchii (Brèthes, 1910)
- Diadasia martialis Timberlake, 1940
- Diadasia megamorpha Cockerell, 1898
- Diadasia mendozana (Brèthes, 1910)
- Diadasia mexicana Timberlake, 1956
- Diadasia nigrifrons (Cresson, 1878)
- Diadasia nitidifrons Cockerell, 1905
- Diadasia ochracea (Cockerell, 1903) (ochraceous chimney bee)
- Diadasia olivacea (Cresson, 1878)
- Diadasia opuntiae Cockerell, 1901
- Diadasia palmarum Timberlake, 1940
- Diadasia patagonica (Brèthes, 1910)
- Diadasia pereyrae (Holmberg, 1903)
- Diadasia piercei Cockerell, 1911
- Diadasia rinconis Cockerell, 1897
- Diadasia ruficruris (Vachal, 1909)
- Diadasia sphaeralcearum Cockerell, 1905
- Diadasia toluca (Cresson, 1878)
- Diadasia tropicalis (Cockerell, 1918)
- Diadasia tuberculifrons Timberlake, 1939
- Diadasia vallicola Timberlake, 1940
- Diadasia willineri (Moure, 1947)
