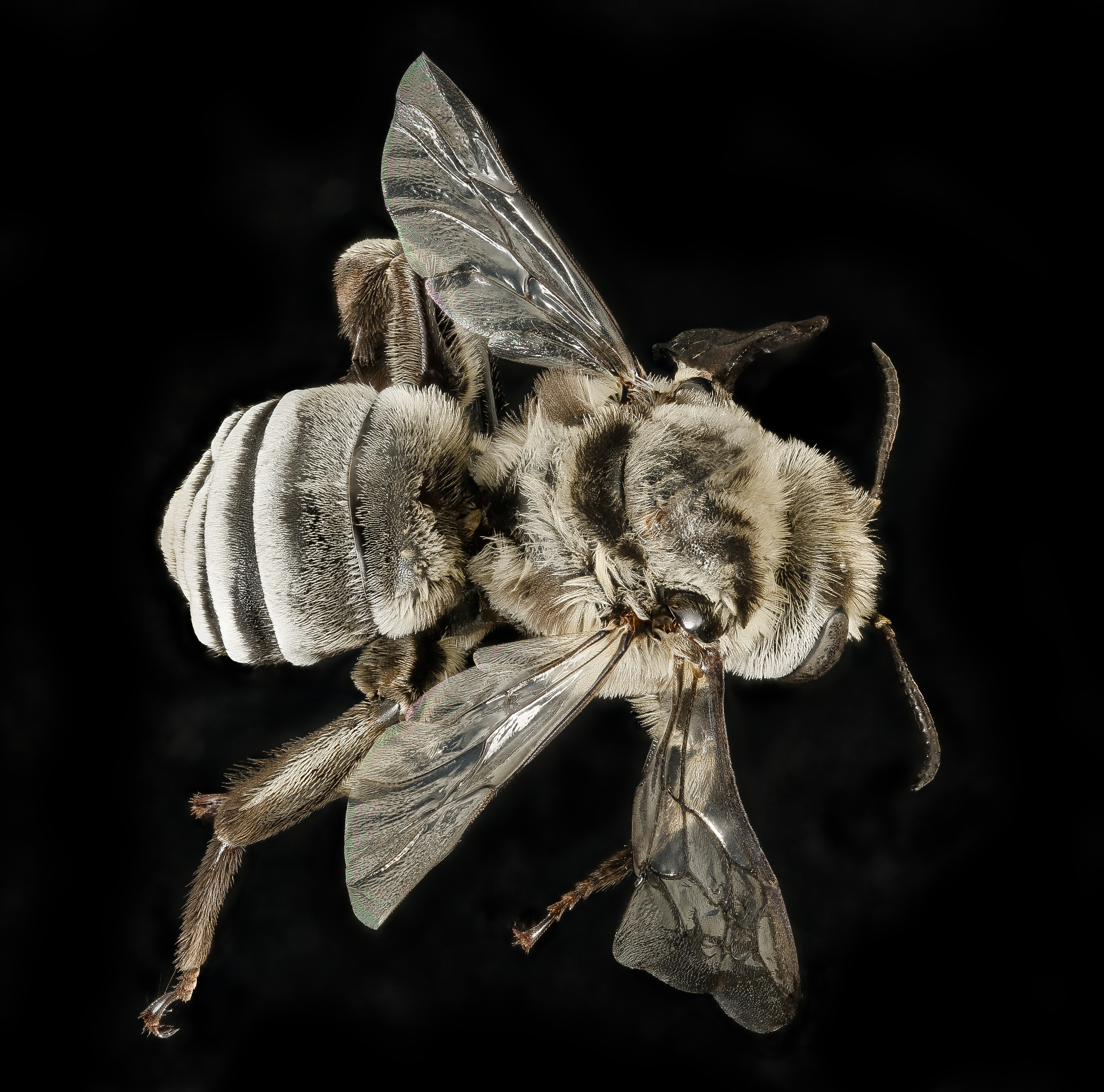
- Melitoma taurea

Scientific classification
- Kingdom: Animalia
- Phylum: Arthropoda
- Class: Insecta
- Order: Hymenoptera
- Family: Apidae
- Tribe: Emphorini
- Genus: Melitoma; Lepeletier & Serville, 1828

= Melitoma =

Genus of bees

Melitoma is a genus of chimney bees in the family Apidae. There are about 13 described species in Melitoma. Found in the Nearctic and Neotropics.

== Species ==
These 11 species belong to the genus Melitoma:

- Melitoma ameghinoi (Holmberg, 1903)^{i c g}
- Melitoma bifax Vachal, 1909^{i c g}
- Melitoma grisella (Cockerell & Porter, 1899)^{i c g}
- Melitoma ipomoearum Ducke, 1913^{i c g}
- Melitoma marginella (Cresson, 1872)^{i c g b}
- Melitoma nudicauda Cockerell, 1949^{i c g}
- Melitoma nudipes (Burmeister, 1876)^{i c g}
- Melitoma osmioides (Ducke, 1908)^{i c g}
- Melitoma segmentaria (Fabricius, 1804)^{i c g}
- Melitoma strenua (Holmberg, 1903)^{i c g}
- Melitoma taurea (Say, 1837)^{i c g b} (mallow bee)

Data sources: i = ITIS, c = Catalogue of Life, g = GBIF, b = Bugguide.net
