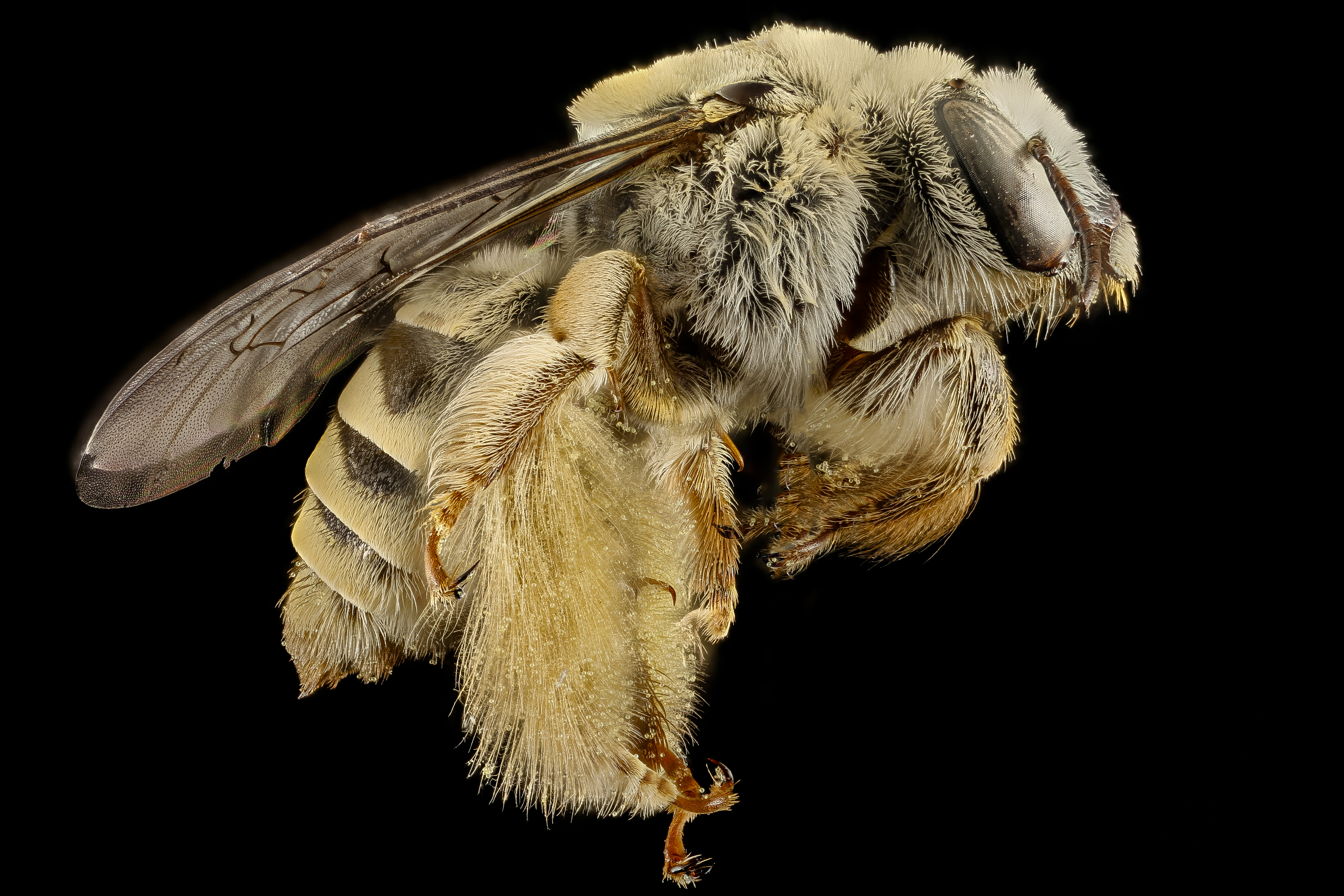

Scientific classification
- Kingdom: Animalia
- Phylum: Arthropoda
- Class: Insecta
- Order: Hymenoptera
- Family: Apidae
- Tribe: Emphorini
- Genus: Diadasia
- Species: D. rinconis

Binomial name
- Diadasia rinconis Cockerell, 1897

= Diadasia rinconis =

Species of bee

Diadasia rinconis is a species of chimney bee in the family Apidae. It is found in Central America and North America. In the Sonoran Desert, D. rinconis is considered the "cactus bee" as it feeds almost exclusively on a number of Sonoran Desert cactus species, its life cycle revolving around the flowering of the native species of cacti. These bees exhibit a tawny coloration, with abdomens either striped with pale bands or covered with pale-gold hairs. Female Diadasia species possess bushy pollen-collecting hairs on their hind legs and distinctive brushes of long hairs on their forelegs. Males often have elongated hind legs.

== Subspecies ==
These two subspecies belong to the species Diadasia rinconis:

- Diadasia rinconis mimetica Cockerell, 1924
- Diadasia rinconis rinconis Cockerell, 1897
