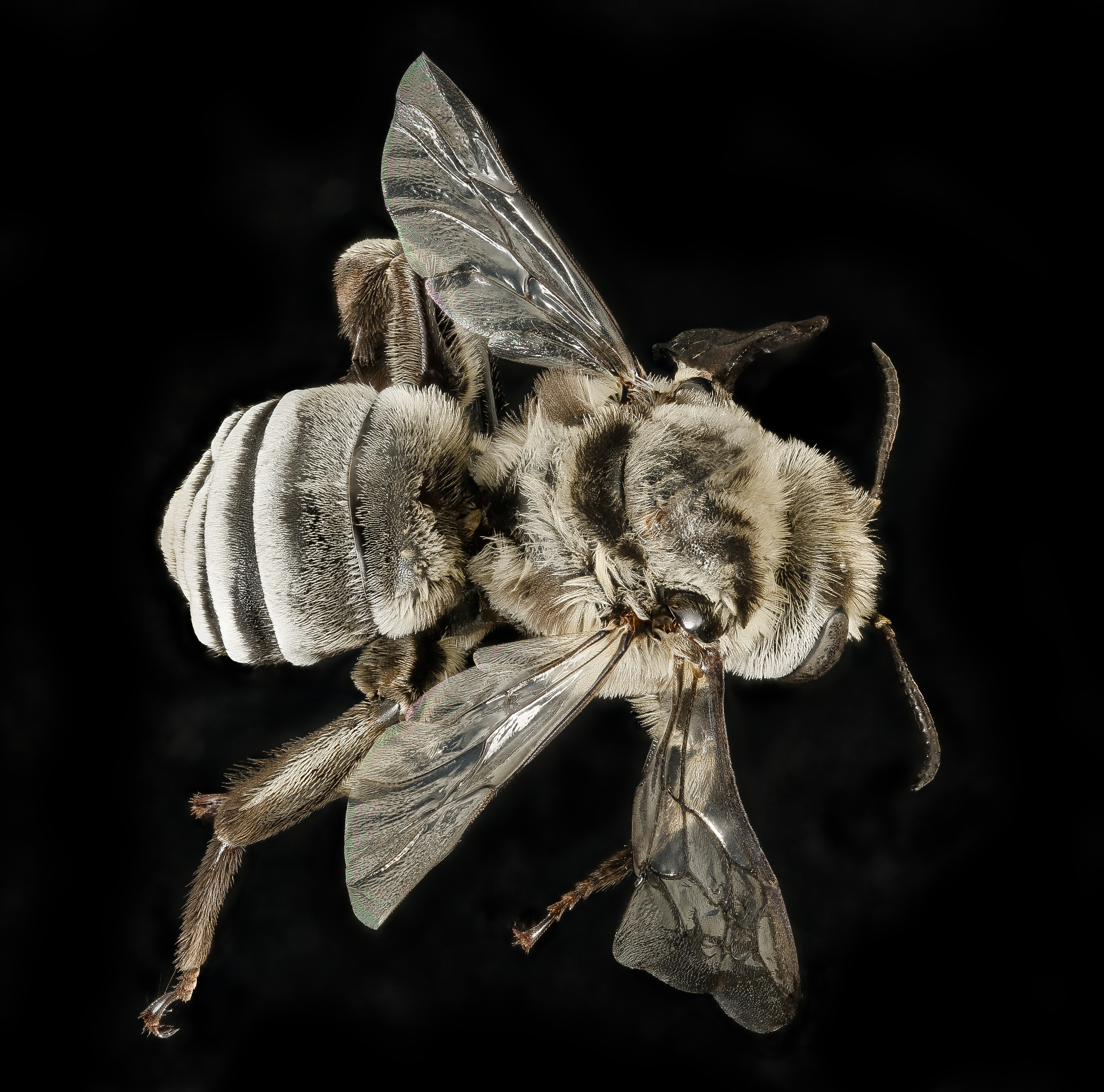

Scientific classification
- Domain: Eukaryota
- Kingdom: Animalia
- Phylum: Arthropoda
- Class: Insecta
- Order: Hymenoptera
- Family: Apidae
- Genus: Melitoma
- Species: M. taurea

Binomial name
- Melitoma taurea (Say, 1837)

= Melitoma taurea =

Species of bee

Melitoma taurea, the mallow bee, is a species of chimney bee in the family Apidae. It is found in North America. It has strong white bands on its abdomen, but is not as hairy as the genera Melissodes and Eucera. Uniquely, the species has a long tongue that, even when folded, reaches all the way to the abdomen.
