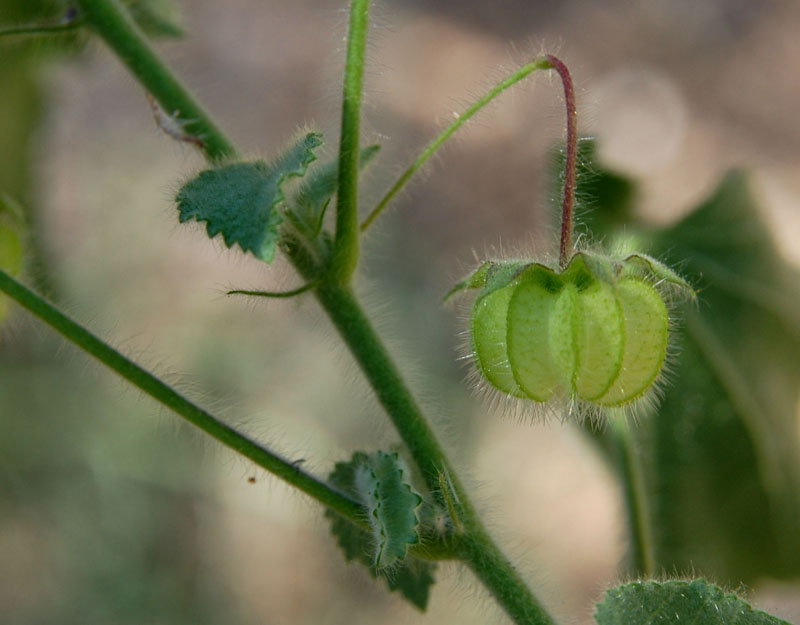
- Herissantia crispa

Scientific classification
- Kingdom: Plantae
- Clade: Tracheophytes
- Clade: Angiosperms
- Clade: Eudicots
- Clade: Rosids
- Order: Malvales
- Family: Malvaceae
- Subfamily: Malvoideae
- Tribe: Malveae
- Genus: Herissantia; Medik.

Species
- About 5, see text

Synonyms
- Bogenhardia Rchb.; Gayoides (Endl.) Small; Pseudobastardia Hassl.

= Herissantia =

Genus of flowering plants

Herissantia is a small genus of flowering plants in the mallow family sometimes referred to as bladder mallows. These are five species of annual and perennial herbs with trailing stems and bladderlike fruits. They are native to the tropical and warm temperate Americas. The most widely distributed species is Herissantia crispa, which can be found on other continents as an introduced species.

Species include:

- Herissantia crispa (L.) Briz.
- Herissantia dressleri Fryxell
- Herissantia intermedia (Hassl.) Krapov.
- Herissantia nemoralis (A. St.-Hil., Juss. & Cambess.) Briz.
- Herissantia tiubae (K. Schum.) Brizicky

Synonyms:

- Herissantia crispa (L.) Medic., ambiguous synonym for Herissantia crispa (L.) Briz.
- Herissantia trichoda (A. Rich.) P.A. Fryxell, synonym for Herissantia crispa (L.) Briz.

Some species have synonymy in genus Abutilon.
