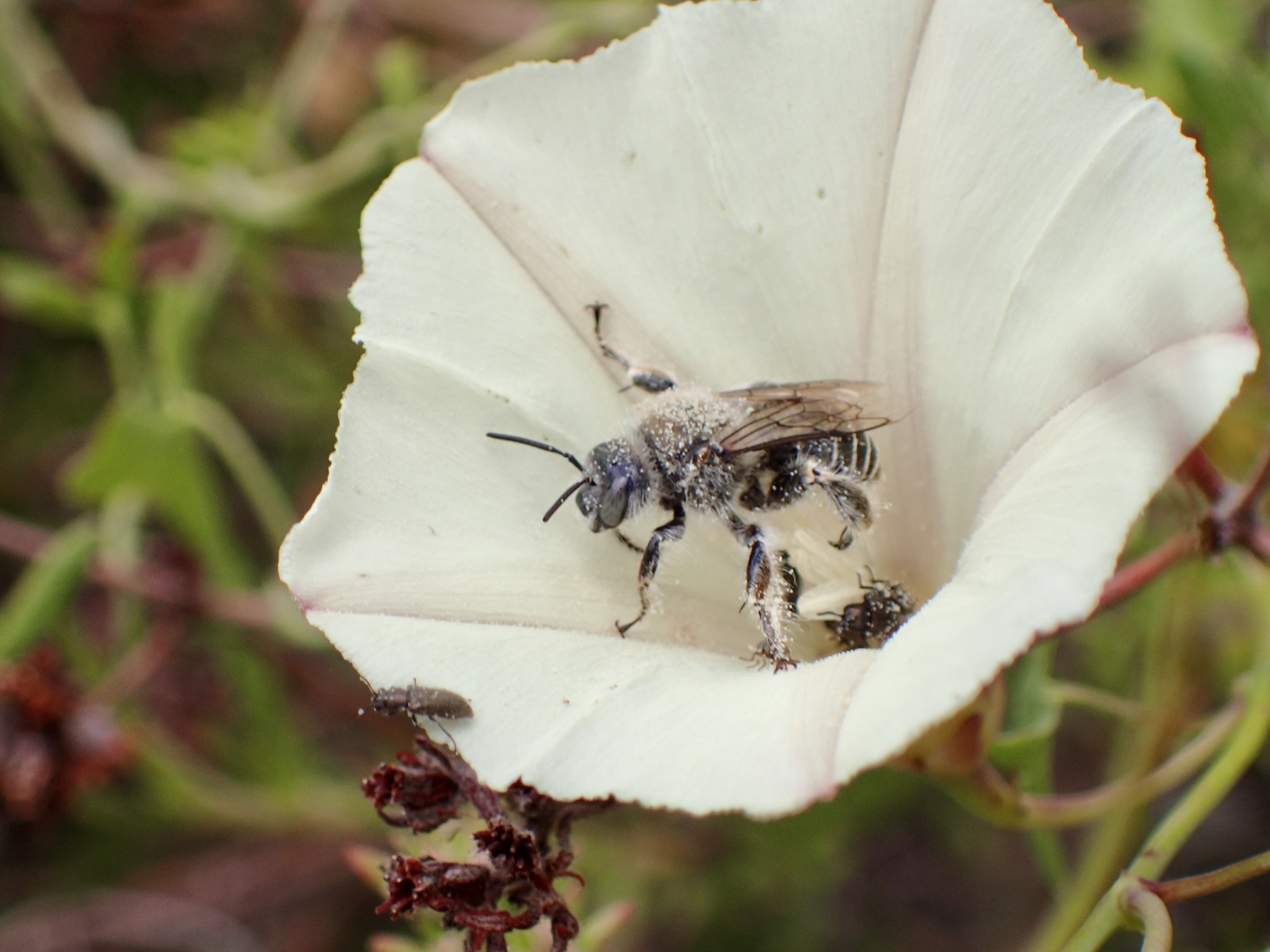

Scientific classification
- Kingdom: Animalia
- Phylum: Arthropoda
- Class: Insecta
- Order: Hymenoptera
- Family: Apidae
- Genus: Diadasia
- Species: D. bituberculata

Binomial name
- Diadasia bituberculata (Cresson, 1878)

= Diadasia bituberculata =

Species of bee

Diadasia bituberculata, also known as bindweed turret bee, and bindweed bee is a species of chimney bee in the family Apidae. The bindweed turret bee is found on the West Coast of Mexico and North America.

== Distribution and habitat ==
The bindweed turret bee's range extends through both Central and North America, but it is found primarily on the West Coast of the United States, especially in California. Colonies have been found as far North as Oregon and as far south as Baja California, Mexico.

== Life Cycle ==
This bee species starts out as an egg, usually laid 1-2 to a nest. After hatching into larva, they feed upon pollen provided by their mothers until they reach the adult stage. At this time, they will leave the nest in search of a mate. Adult bees are typically active for only a few months, between April and July. During this period the bees will mate, build their nests, gather food and lay eggs. Towards the end of spring and into early summer, they seal off their nests. For the remaining months of the year, the bee eggs will hatch and the larva will grow until they reach the adult stage and exit their nests in early spring, starting the cycle again.

== Behavior ==
Bindweed turret bees are a solitary species of bee that build individual nests rather than residing in colonies. However, they often nest in large groups with other bees of the same species. They tend to build their nests in dry areas on flat, bare ground such as parking lots or trails. The bees nests are formed out of soil and take the form of turrets or tubes that protrude above the ground, providing entrance to small underground tunnels.

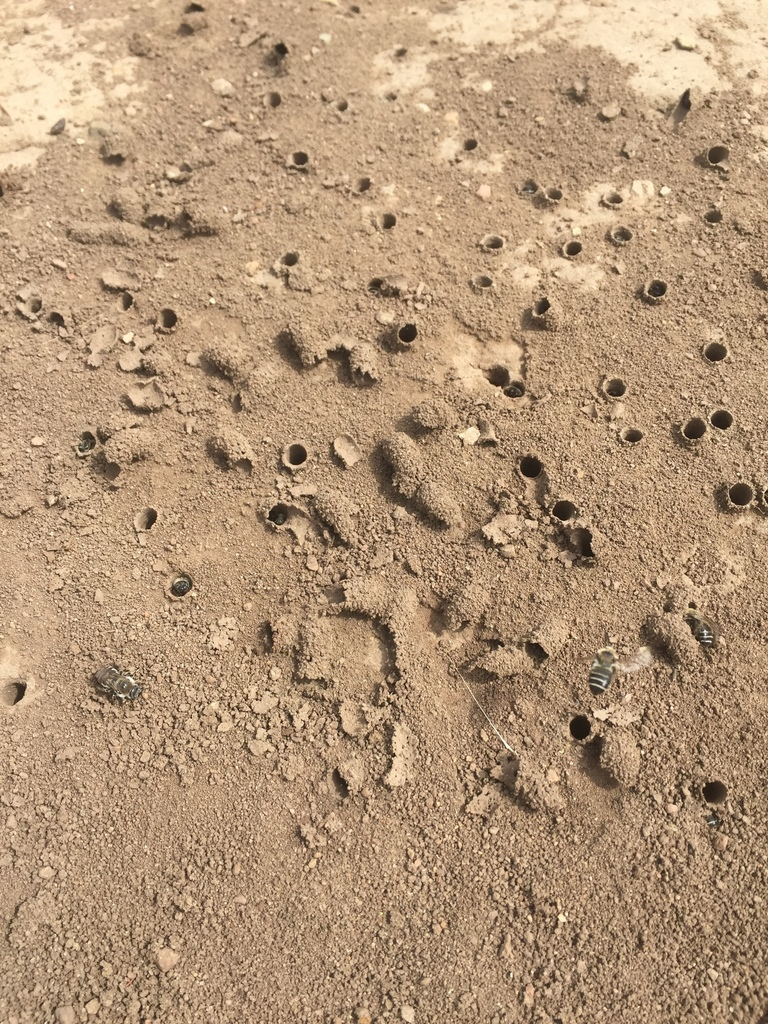
Aggregated nests of bindweed turret bees (Diadasia bituberculata)

It is hypothesized that these tube-like structures offer protection from one of the bees' primary predators, Bombyliidae, whose larvae feed parasitically on the bee larva. These bees are known to feed on island false bindweed, showy penstemon, cobwebby thistle, and butterfly mariposa lily. From these flowers they both gather nectar, which they use to soften earth to build their turrets, and pollen, which they use to feed their young.
