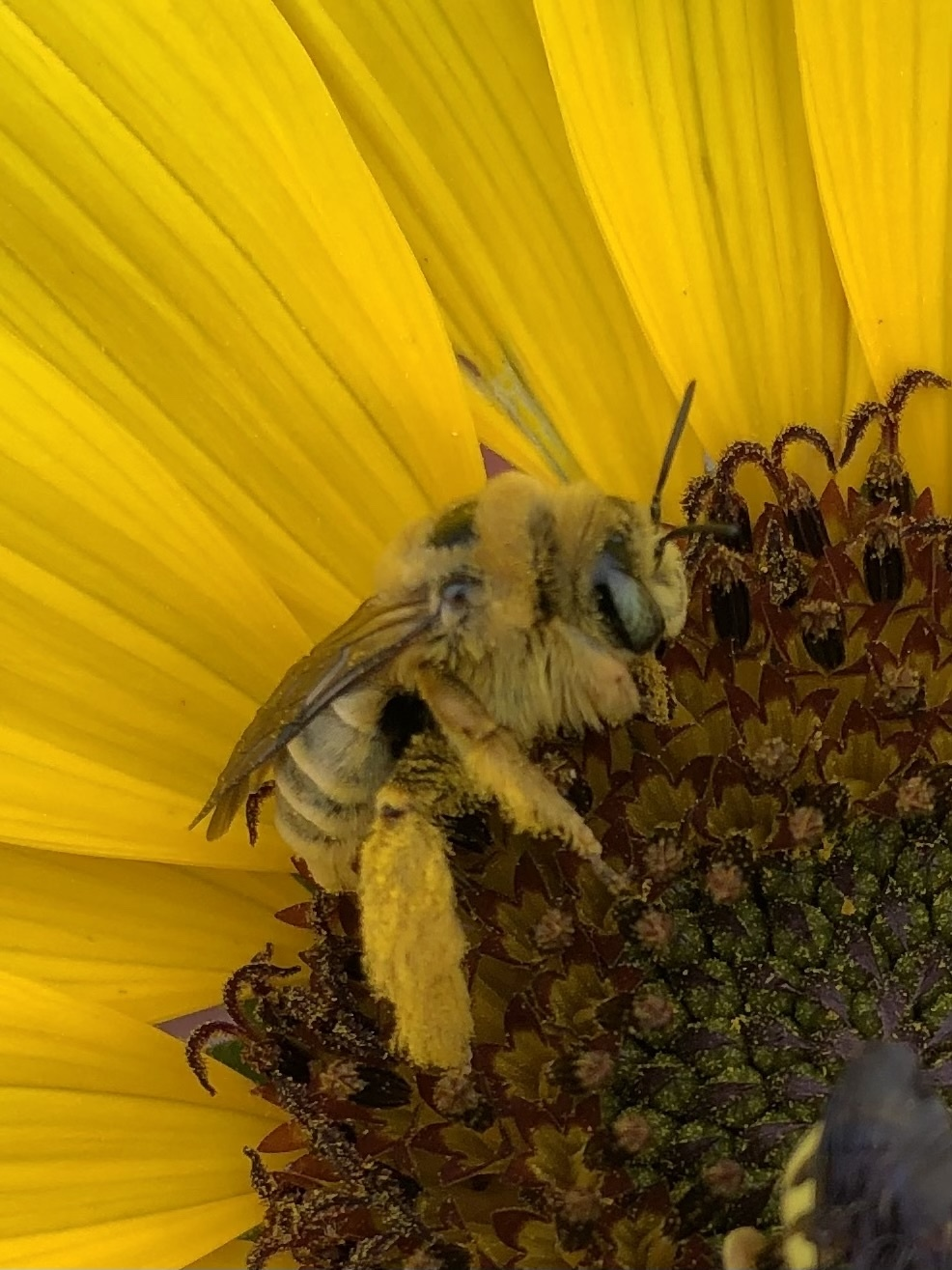

Scientific classification
- Kingdom: Animalia
- Phylum: Arthropoda
- Class: Insecta
- Order: Hymenoptera
- Family: Apidae
- Genus: Diadasia
- Species: D. enavata

Binomial name
- Diadasia enavata (Cresson, 1872)

= Diadasia enavata =

Species of bee

Diadasia enavata, the sunflower chimney bee, is a species of chimney bee in the family Apidae. It is found in Central America and North America. It is a pollinator restricted to plants of the Asteraceae family. It has been observed pollinating Coreopsis tinctoria.

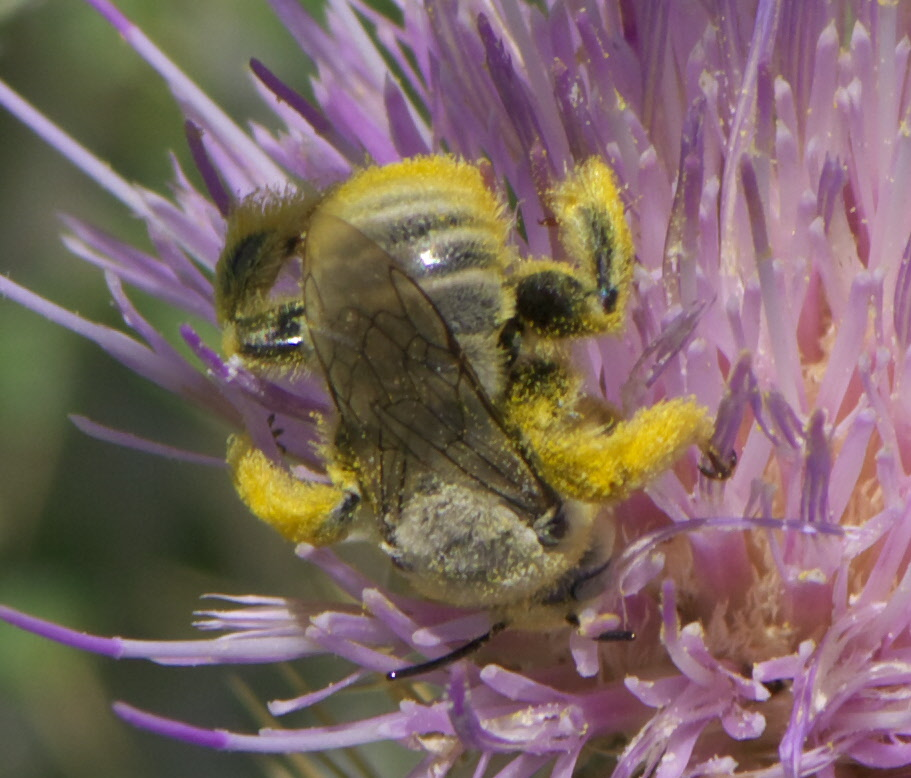
Sunflower chimney bee, Diadasia enavata
