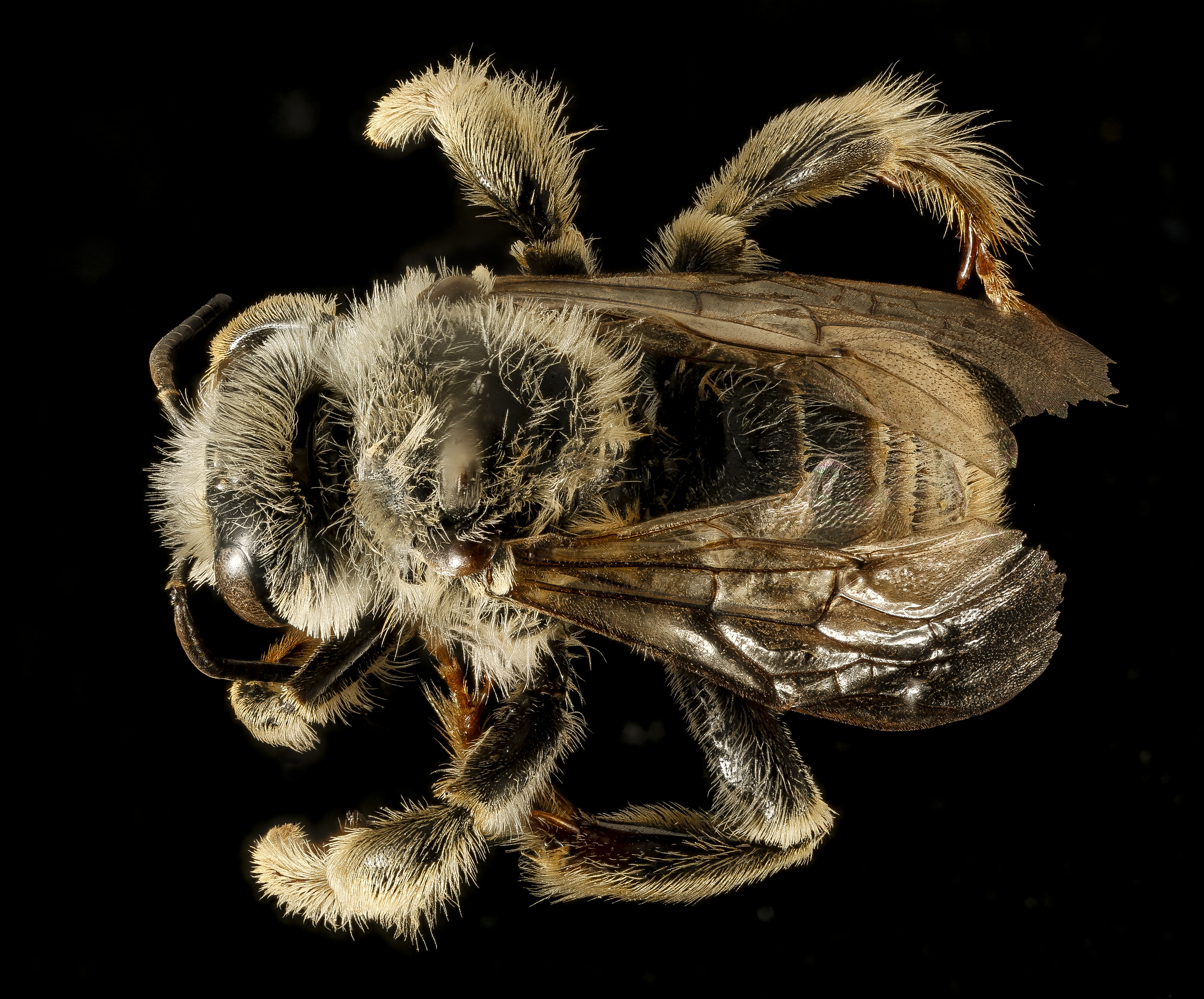

Scientific classification
- Domain: Eukaryota
- Kingdom: Animalia
- Phylum: Arthropoda
- Class: Insecta
- Order: Hymenoptera
- Family: Apidae
- Genus: Diadasia
- Species: D. australis

Binomial name
- Diadasia australis (Cresson, 1878)

= Diadasia australis =

Species of bee

Diadasia australis is a species of chimney bee in the family Apidae. It is found in Central America and North America.

== Subspecies ==
These three subspecies belong to the species Diadasia australis:

- Diadasia australis australis (Cresson, 1878)
- Diadasia australis californica (Cresson, 1878)
- Diadasia australis knabiana Cockerell
