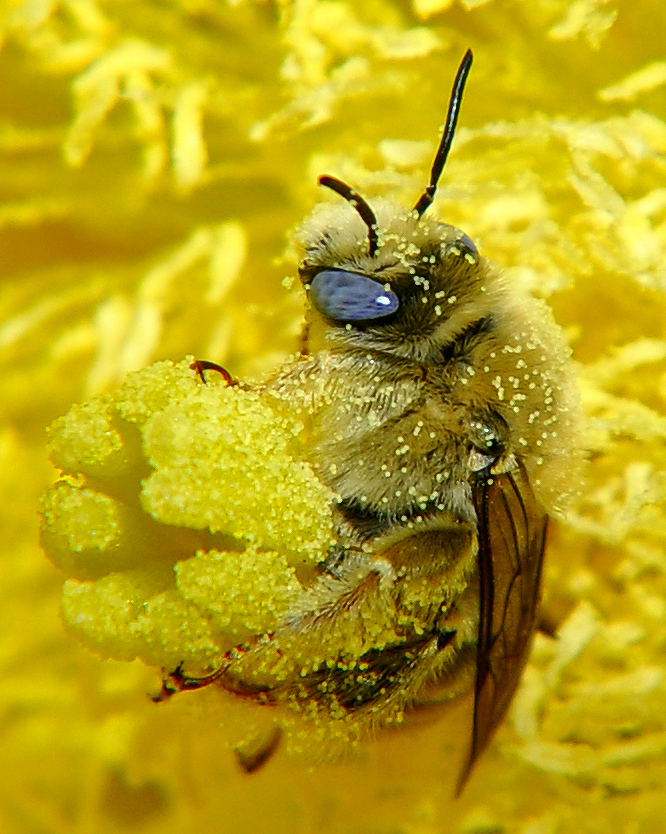

Scientific classification
- Domain: Eukaryota
- Kingdom: Animalia
- Phylum: Arthropoda
- Class: Insecta
- Order: Hymenoptera
- Family: Apidae
- Genus: Diadasia
- Species: D. diminuta

Binomial name
- Diadasia diminuta (Cresson, 1878)

= Diadasia diminuta =

Species of bee

Diadasia diminuta, the globe mallow bee, is a species of chimney bee in the family Apidae. It is found in Central America and North America.

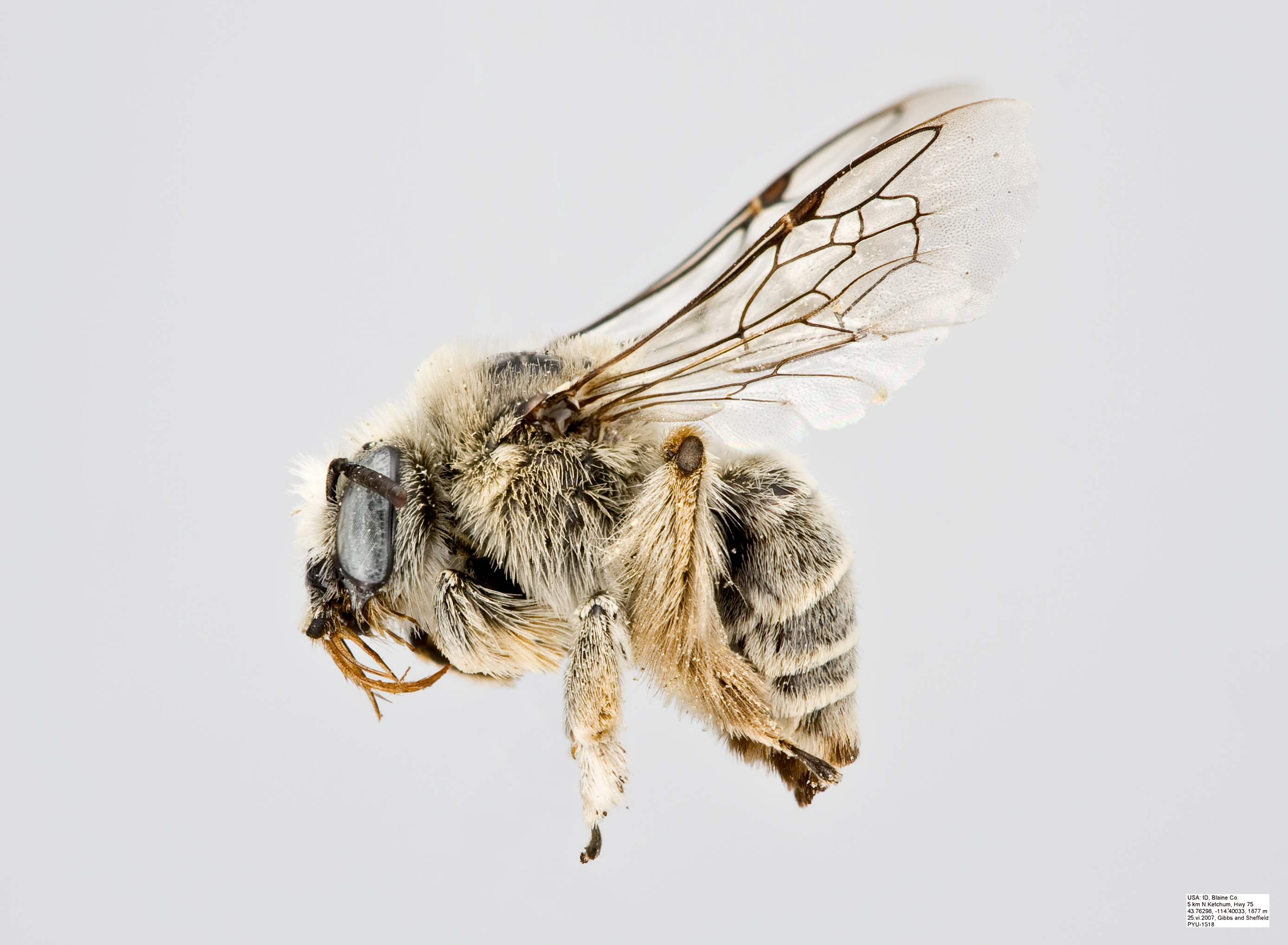
Globe mallow bee, Diadasia diminuta
