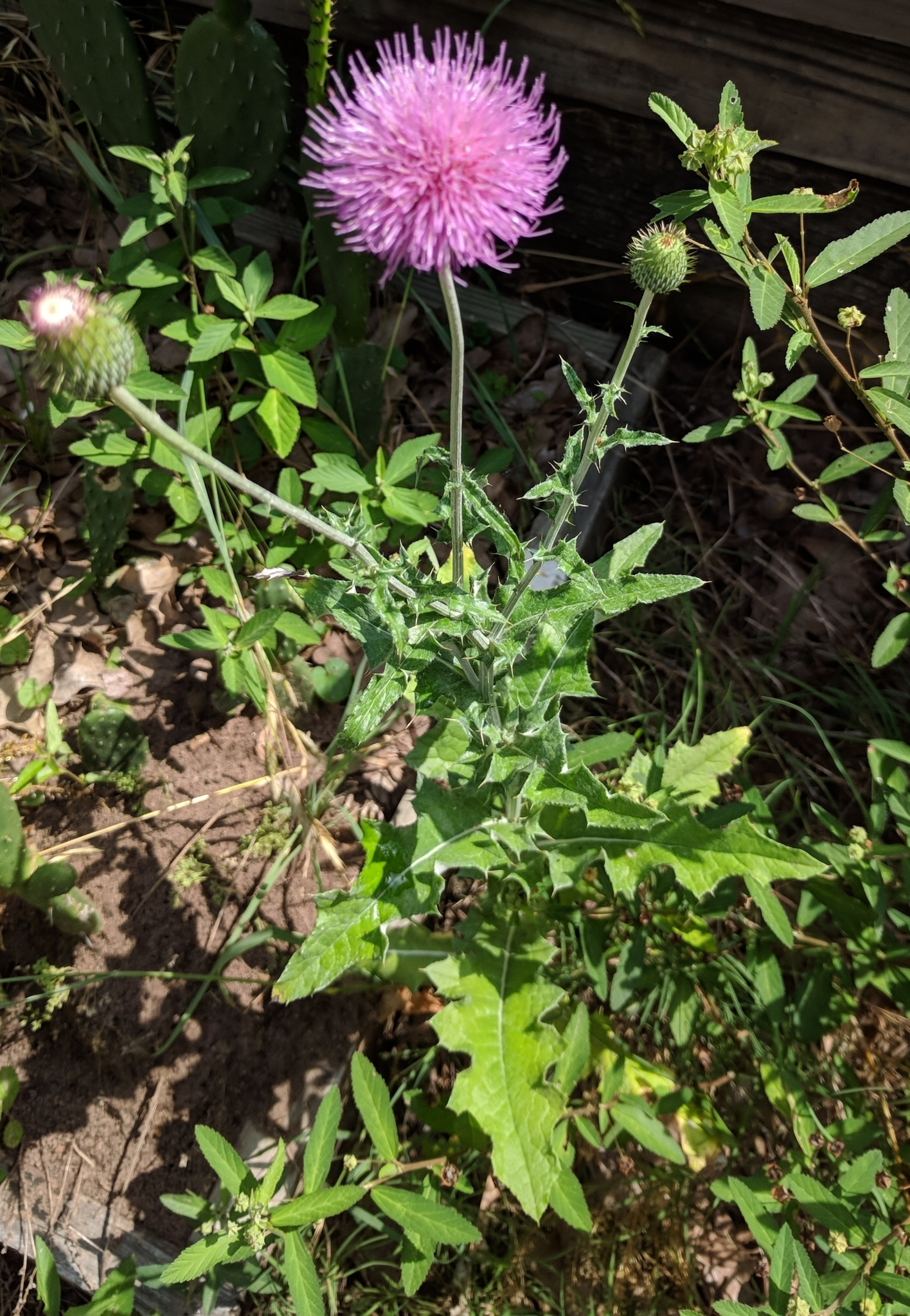

Scientific classification
- Kingdom: Plantae
- Clade: Tracheophytes
- Clade: Angiosperms
- Clade: Eudicots
- Clade: Asterids
- Order: Asterales
- Family: Asteraceae
- Genus: Cirsium
- Species: C. texanum

Binomial name
- Cirsium texanum Buckley

Synonyms
- Carduus austrinus Small; Carduus filipendulus (A.Gray) Rydb.; Carduus helleri Small; Cirsium austrinum (Small) E.D.Schulz; Cirsium helleri (Small) Cory

= Cirsium texanum =

Species of thistle

Cirsium texanum is a species of plant in the tribe Cardueae within the family Asteraceae found in North America. Common names include Texas thistle, Texas purple thistle or southern thistle. The species is native to northern Mexico (Coahuila, Durango, Nuevo León, San Luis Potosí, Tamaulipas) and the southern Great Plains of the south-central United States (primarily Texas, Oklahoma, and eastern New Mexico with additional populations in Louisiana, Arkansas, and Missouri). It grows in prairies and roadsides.

Cirsium texanum is a biennial or perennial herb up to 80 cm (32 inches) tall. Leaves have small, narrow spines along the edges. Flower heads are sometimes produced one at a time, sometimes in small groups, each head with light purple disc florets but no ray florets.

The flowers of Cirsium texanum provide nectar for butterflies and the foliage is used as a source of food for the larvae of the painted lady butterfly. Goldfinches also use the seeds as a food source.
