= Ptilothrix sumichrasti =

Scientific classification
- Domain: Eukaryota
- Kingdom: Animalia
- Phylum: Arthropoda
- Class: Insecta
- Order: Hymenoptera
- Family: Apidae
- Genus: Ptilothrix
- Species: P. sumichrasti

Binomial name
- Ptilothrix sumichrasti (Cresson, 1878)

Species of insect

Ptilothrix sumichrasti is a species of chimney bee in the family Apidae. It is found in South America.
