= Scopa (biology) =

Feature of bee anatomy

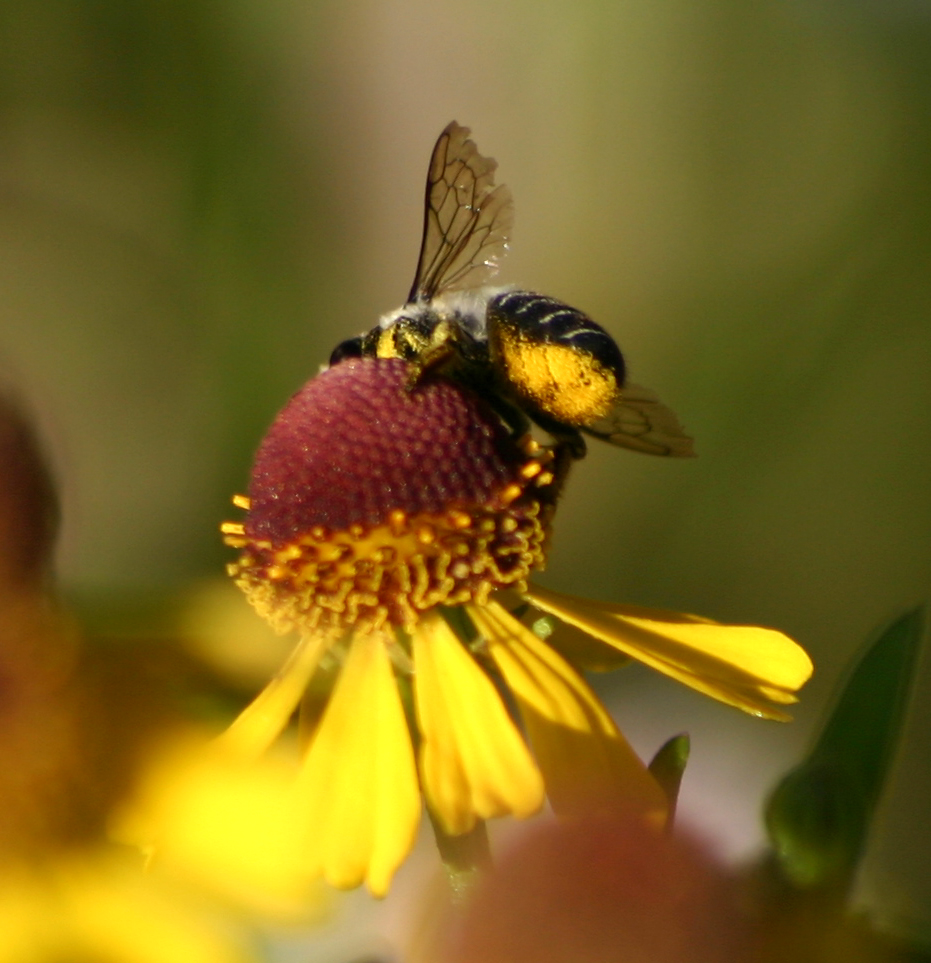
Abdominal scopa of Megachile on the pseudanthium of a composite

A scopa (plural scopae; Latin for "broom") is any of a number of different modifications on the body of a non-parasitic bee that form a pollen-carrying apparatus. In most species of bees, the scopa is simply a dense mass of elongated, often branched, hairs (or setae) on the hind leg. When present on the hind legs, the modified hairs are, at a minimum, on the tibia, but some bees also have modified hairs on the femur and/or trochanter. A few bees have, in addition to the leg hairs, many modified hairs on the ventral surface of the abdomen which are also used in pollen transport; one family of bees, the Megachilidae, lack modified leg hairs, but have an extensive scopa on the underside of the abdomen (see photo).

Honey bees and bumblebees have a more highly developed structure than the scopa: the corbicula, or pollen basket. Various species of bees have other types of modified hairs that collect pollen, floral oils, or other chemicals from plants; such hairs may be borne on the face, mouthparts, or the front or middle legs, but such hairs are not called scopae. The term "scopa" is restricted to hairs adapted to the transport of pollen.

Some species of bees transport pollen internally in the crop, and they lack a scopa, as do kleptoparasitic bees, which do not gather their own pollen.

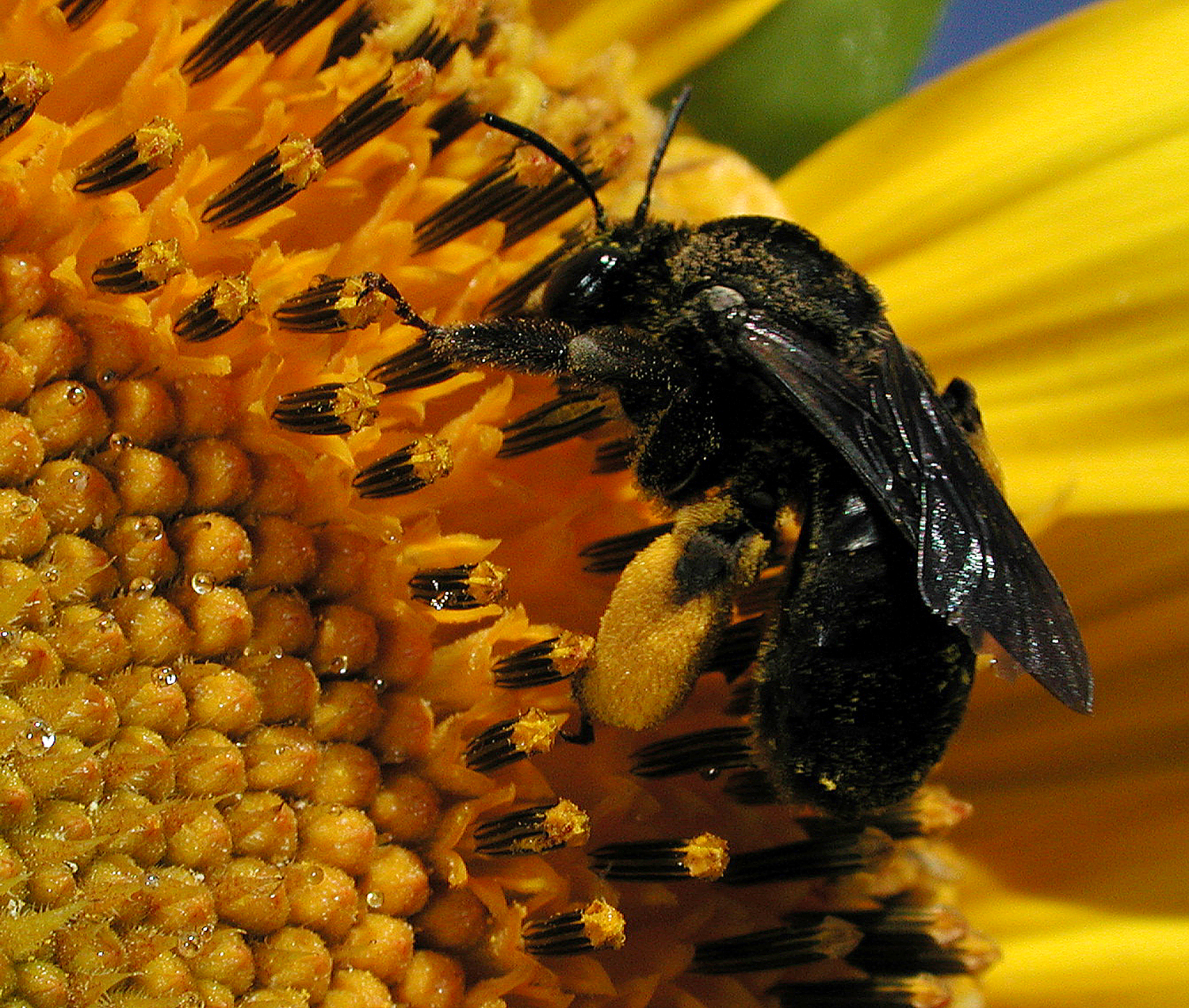
Scopa of a Melissodes (family Apidae) on a sunflower; only the hind tibia carries pollen

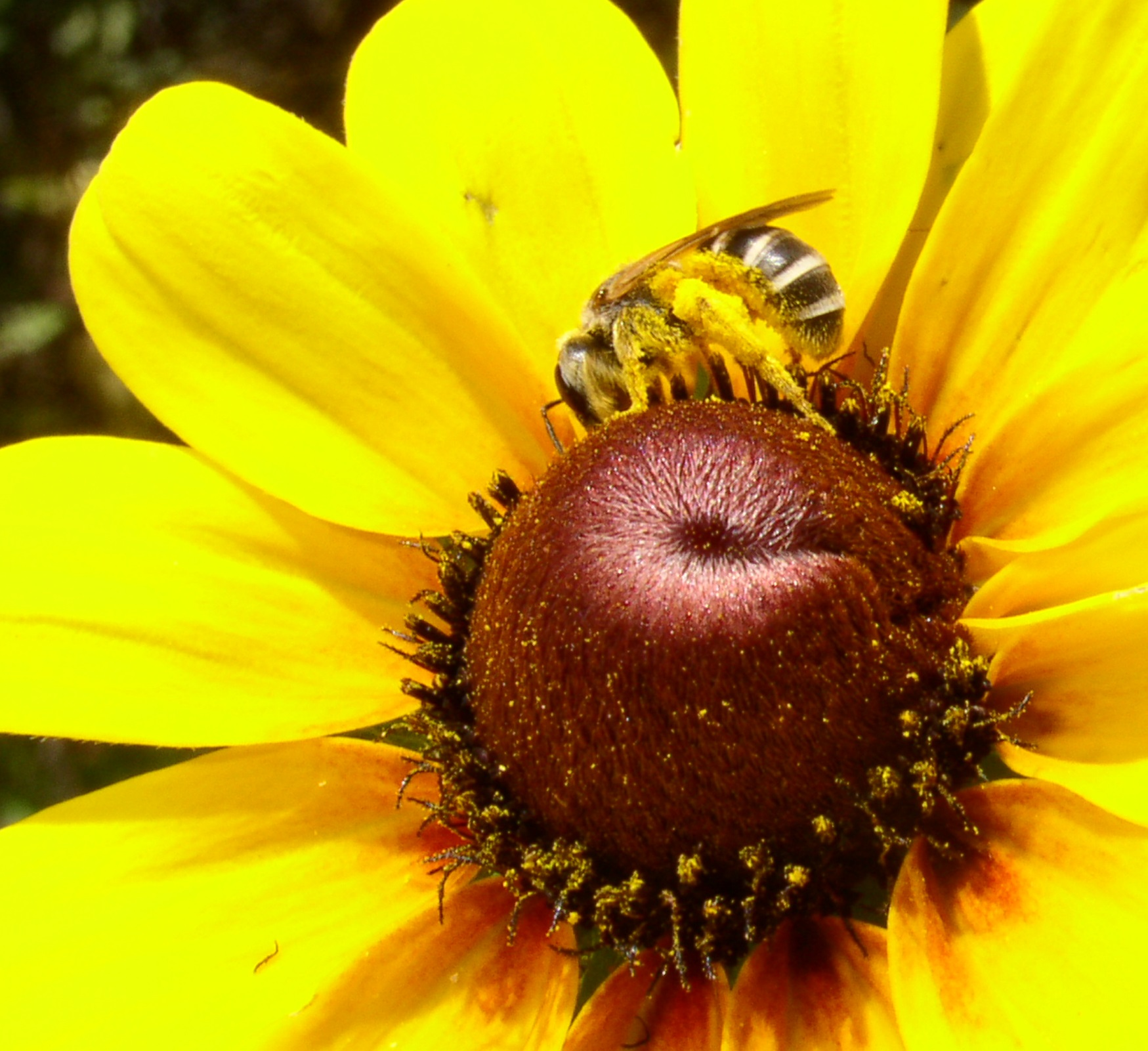
Scopa of a Halictid bee; the entire hind leg and abdomen carry pollen

== See also ==
- Corbicula
