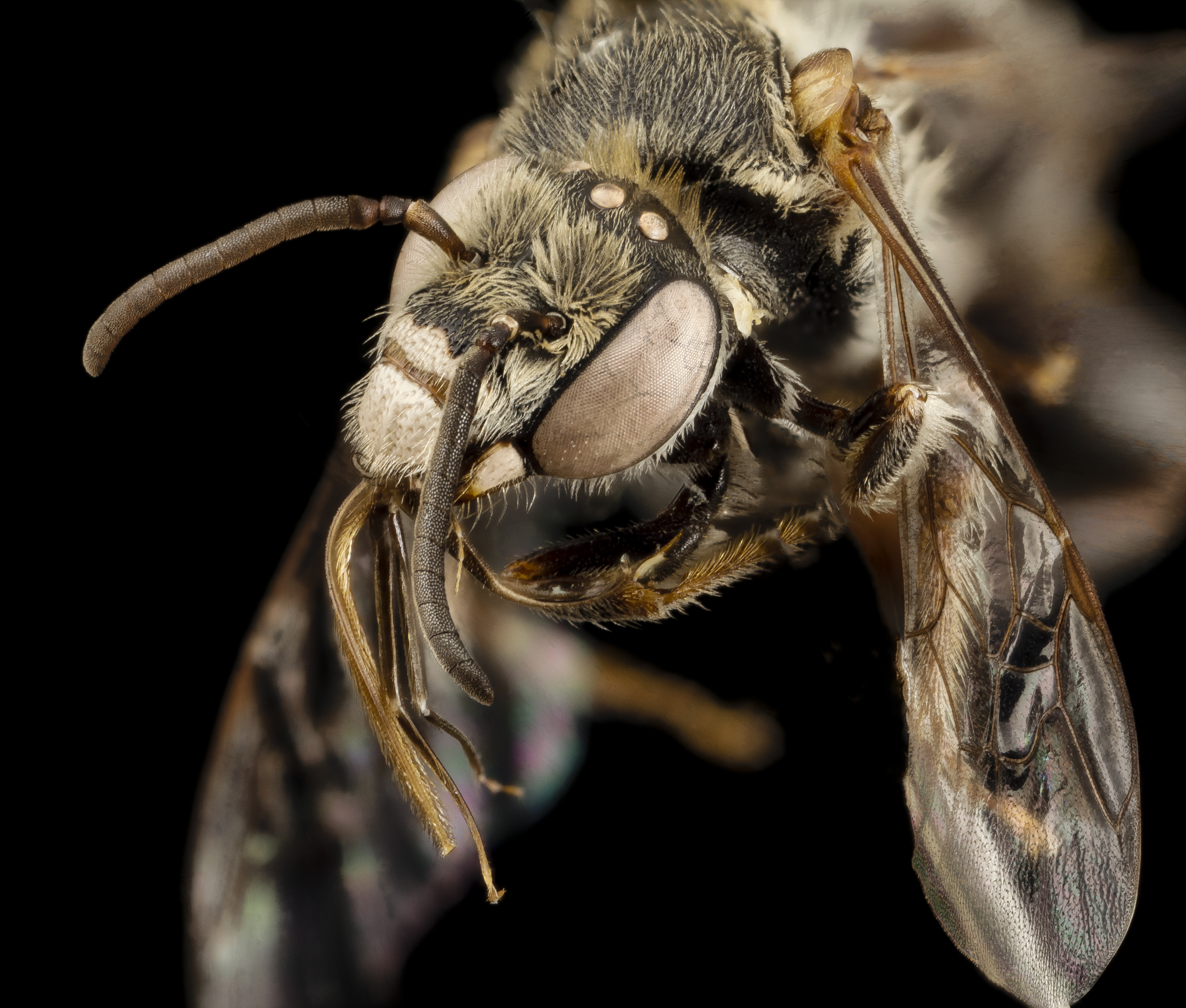
- Head of Ancyloscelis apiformis

Scientific classification
- Kingdom: Animalia
- Phylum: Arthropoda
- Clade: Pancrustacea
- Class: Insecta
- Order: Hymenoptera
- Family: Apidae
- Subfamily: Apinae
- Tribe: Emphorini; Robertson, 1904

Genera
- see text

= Emphorini =

Tribe of bees

The Emphorini are a tribe of apid bees.

== Genera ==
- Alepidosceles Moure, 1947
- Diadasia Patton, 1879
- Diadasina Moure, 1950
  - Diadasina (Diadasina)
  - Diadasina (Leptometriella) Roig-Alsina, 1998
- Meliphilopsis Roig-Alsina, 1994
- Melitoma Lepeletier and Serville, 1828
- Melitomella Roig-Alsina, 1998
- Ptilothrix Smith 1853
- Toromelissa Roig-Alsina, 1998
