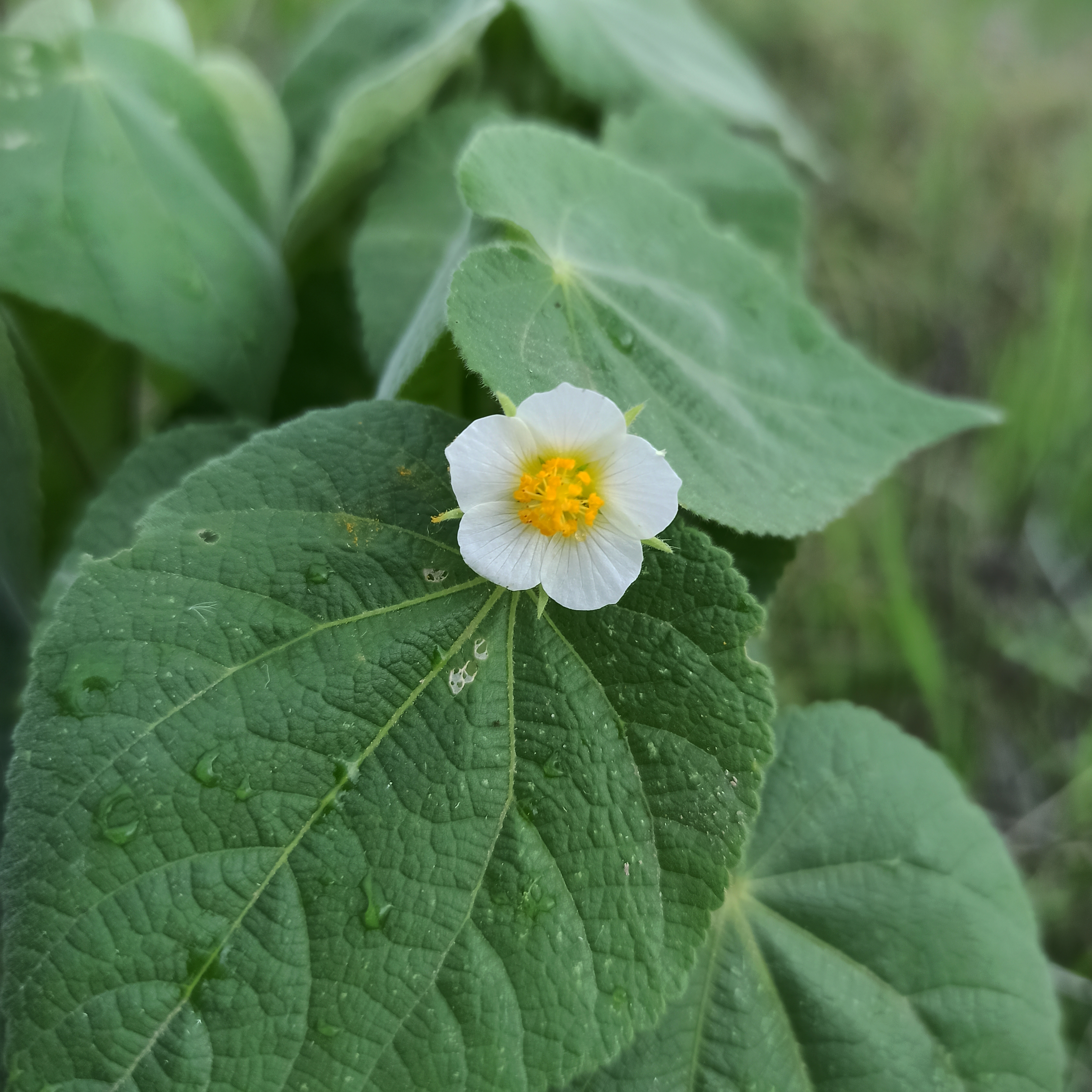

Scientific classification
- Kingdom: Plantae
- Clade: Embryophytes
- Clade: Tracheophytes
- Clade: Angiosperms
- Clade: Eudicots
- Clade: Rosids
- Order: Malvales
- Family: Malvaceae
- Genus: Herissantia
- Species: H. crispa

Binomial name
- Herissantia crispa (L.) Brizicky

Synonyms
- Abutilon crispum; Gayoides crispum

= Herissantia crispa =

Species of flowering plant

Herissantia crispa is a species of flowering plant in the mallow family known by the common names bladdermallow and curly abutilon. It is native to the tropical Americas but it can be found throughout the tropical and warmer temperate world as an introduced species and sometimes a weed. This is a perennial or sometimes annual herb growing up to about 1.5 meters in maximum stem length, usually taking a trailing or creeping form. It is coated in whitish hairs. The oval or heart-shaped leaves are up to 7 centimeters long with rippled edges. The inflorescence is a solitary flower emerging from a leaf axil, borne on a long-haired pedicel which is half erect and then jointed downward. The flower has five pale yellow oval petals each up to a centimeter long. The fruit is a lantern-like inflated sphere ribbed into segments. It is up to 2 centimeters wide, coated in long hairs, and dehiscent, each segment containing 2 or 3 black kidney-shaped seeds.
