= List of Malvaceae genera =

This is a list of genera in the plant family Malvaceae. Malvaceae includes Alcea (hollyhock), Malva (mallow) and Gossypium (cotton), as well as Tilia (lime or linden tree). As of June 2026, Plants of the World Online accepts 250 genera.

== A ==
- Abelmoschus Medik.
- Abroma Jacq.
- Abutilon Mill.
- Acaulimalva Krapov.
- Acropogon Schltr.
- Adansonia L. - baobabs
- Aguiaria Ducke
- Akrosida Fryxell & Fuertes
- Alcea L. – hollyhocks
- Allobriquetia Bovini
- Allosidastrum (Hochr.) Krapov., Fryxell & Bates
- Allowissadula D.M.Bates
- Althaea L.
- Alyogyne Alef.
- Ancistrocarpus Oliv.
- Andeimalva J.A.Tate
- Andringitra Skema
- Androcalva C.F.Wilkins & Whitlock
- Anisodontea C.Presl
- Anoda Cav.
- Anotea (DC.) Kunth
- Apeiba Aubl.
- Argyrodendron F.Muell.
- Asterotrichion Klotzsch
- Astrohibiscus McLay & R.L.Barrett
- Ayenia L.
- Azanza Alef.

== B ==
- Bakeridesia Hochr.
- Bastardiastrum (Rose) D.M.Bates
- Batesimalva Fryxell
- Bernoullia Oliv.
- Berrya Roxb.
- Billieturnera Fryxell
- Blanchardia M.M.Hanes & R.L.Barrett
- Bombax L.
- Bombycidendron Zoll. & Moritzi
- Bordasia Krapov.
- Boschia Korth.
- Brachychiton Schott & Endl.
- Briquetia Hochr.
- Brownlowia Roxb.
- Burretiodendron Rehder

== C ==
- Callianthe Donnell
- Callirhoe Nutt.
- Calyculogygas Krapov.
- Calyptraemalva Krapov.
- Camptostemon Mast.
- Carpodiptera Griseb.
- Catostemma Benth.
- Cavanillesia Ruiz & Pav.
- Ceiba Mill.
- Cenocentrum Gagnep.
- Cephalohibiscus Ulbr.
- Cheirolaena Benth
- Chiranthodendron Larreat.
- Christiana DC.
- Cienfuegosia Cav.
- Clappertonia Meisn.
- Coelostegia Benth.
- Cola Schott & Endl.
- Colona Cav.
- Commersonia J.R.Forst. & G.Forst.
- Corchoropsis Siebold & Zucc.
- Corchorus L.
- Corynabutilon (K.Schum.) Kearney
- Craigia W.W.Sm. & W.E.Evans
- Cravenia McLay & R.L.Barrett
- Cristaria Cav.
- Cullenia Wight

== D ==
- Decaschistia Wight & Arn.
- Dendrosida J.E.Fryxell
- Desplatsia Bocq.
- Dicarpidium F.Muell.
- Dicellostyles Benth.
- Diplodiscus Turcz.
- Dirhamphis Krapov.
- Dombeya Cav.
- Duboscia Bocq.
- Durio Adans.

== E ==
- Eleutherostylis Burret – synonym of Grewia L.
- Entelea R.Br.
- Eremalche Greene
- Erinocarpus Nimmo ex J.Graham
- Eriolaena DC.
- Eriotheca Schott & Endl.
- Erioxylum Rose & Standl. – synonym of Gossypium L.

== F ==
- Firmiana Marsili
- Franciscodendron B.Hyland & Steenis
- Fremontodendron Coult.
- Friedmannodendron Le Péchon & Skema
- Fryxellia D.M.Bates
- Fuertesimalva Fryxell

== G ==
- Gaya Kunth
- Gilesia F.Muell.
- Glossostemon Desf.
- Glyphaea Hook.f.
- Goethalsia Pittier
- Gossypioides Skovst. ex J.B.Hutch.
- Gossypium L.
- Grewia L.
- Guazuma Mill.
- Guichenotia J.Gay
- Gynatrix Alef.
- Gyranthera Pittier

== H ==
- Hafotra Dorr
- Hampea Schltdl.
- Hannafordia F.Muell.
- Harmsia K.Schum.
- Helicteres Pluk. ex L.
- Helicteropsis Hochr.
- Heliocarpus L.
- Herissantia Medik.
- Heritiera Aiton
- Hermannia L.
- Herrania Goudot – synonym of Theobroma
- Hibiscadelphus Rock
- Hibiscus L.
- Hildegardia Schott & Endl.
- Hochreutinera Krapov.
- Hoheria A.Cunn.
- Horsfordia A.Gray
- Howittia F.Muell.
- Huberodendron Ducke
- Humbertiella Hochr.
- Hydrogaster Kuhlm.

== I ==
- Iliamna Greene
- Indagator Halford

== J ==
- Jarandersonia Kosterm.
- Julostylis Thwaites
- Jumelleanthus Hochr.

== K ==
- Kearnemalvastrum D.M.Bates
- Kitaibelia Willd.
- Kleinhovia L.
- Kokia Lewton
- Kosteletzkya C.Presl.
- Kostermansia Soegeng
- Krapovickasia Fryxell
- Kydia Roxb.

== L ==
- Lagunaria (DC.) Rchb.
- Lasiopetalum Sm.
- Lawrencia Hook.
- Lebronnecia Fosberg & Sachet
- Lecanophora Speg.
- Leptonychia Turcz.
- Luehea Willd.
- Lueheopsis Burret
- Lysiosepalum F.Muell.

== M ==
- Malachra L.
- Malacothamnus Greene
- Malope L.
- Malva Tourn. ex L.
- × Malvalthaea Iljin
- Malvastrum A.Gray
- Malvaviscus Fabr.
- Malvella Jaub. & Spach
- Mansonia J.R.Drumm.
- Marcanodendron Doweld
- Matisia Humb. & Bonpl.
- Maxwellia Baill.
- Megatritheca Cristóbal
- Megistostegium Hochr.
- Melhania Forssk.
- Melochia L.
- Meximalva Fryxell
- Microcos Burm. ex L.
- Modiola Moench
- Modiolastrum K.Schum.
- Mollia Mart.
- Monteiroa Krapov.
- Mortoniodendron Standl. & Steyerm.
- Muenchhusia Heist. ex Fabr.

== N ==
- Napaea L.
- Nayariophyton T.K.Paul
- Neesia Blume
- Neobaclea Hochr.
- Neobrittonia Hochr.
- Neobuchia Urb.
- Neoregnellia Urb.
- Nesogordonia Baill.
- Nototriche Turcz.

== O ==
- Ochroma Sw.
- Octolobus Welw.

== P ==
- Pachira Aubl.
- Palaua Cav.
- Papuodendron C.T.White
- Patinoa Cuatrec.
- Pavonia Cav.
- Peltaea (C.Presl) Standl.
- Pentace Hassk.
- Pentapetes L.
- Pentaplaris L.O.Williams & Standl.
- Periptera DC.
- Perrierophytum Hochr.
- Phragmocarpidium Krapov.
- Phragmotheca Cuatrec.
- Phymosia Desv.
- Physodium C.Presl
- Pityranthe Thwaites
- Plagianthus J.R.Forst. & G.Forst.
- Pochota Ram.Goyena
- Pseudabutilon R.E.Fr.
- Pseudobombax Dugand
- Pseudocorchorus Capuron
- Pterocymbium R.Br.
- Pterospermum Schreb.
- Pterygota Schott & Endl.

== Q - R ==
- Quararibea Aubl.
- Radyera Bullock
- Reevesia Lindl.
- Rhodognaphalon (Ulbr.) Roberty
- Rhynchosida Fryxell
- Ripariosida Weakley & D.B.Poind.
- Robinsonella Rose & Baker f.
- Roifia Verdc.
- Rojasimalva Fryxell
- Ruizia Cav.

== S ==
- Sabdariffa (DC.) Kostel.
- Scaphium Schott & Endl.
- Scaphopetalum Mast.
- Schoutenia Korth.
- Scleronema Benth.
- Senra Cav.
- Septotheca Ulbr.
- Seringia J.Gay
- Sida L.
- Sidalcea A.Gray ex Benth.
- Sidasodes Fryxell & Fuertes
- Sidastrum Baker f.
- Somnuekia Duangjai, Chalermw., Sinbumr. & Suddee
- Sparrmannia L.f.
- Sphaeralcea A.St.-Hil.
- Spirabutilon Krapov.
- Spirotheca Ulbr.
- Sterculia L.

== T ==
- Tarasa Phil.
- Tetralix Griseb.
- Tetrasida Ulbr.
- Theobroma L.
- Thepparatia Phuph.
- Thespesia Sol. ex Corrêa
- Thomasia J.Gay
- Tilia L.
- Trichospermum Blume
- Triplochiton K.Schum.
- Triumfetta Plum. ex L.
- Trochetia DC. – synonym of Ruizia
- Trochetiopsis Marais – synonym of Melhania
- Tropidococcus Krapov.

== U - Z ==
- Ungeria Schott & Endl.
- Urena Dill ex L.
- Urocarpidium Ulbr.
- Vasivaea Baill.
- Waltheria L.
- Wercklea Pittier & Standl.
- Wissadula Medik.
- Woodianthus Krapov.
