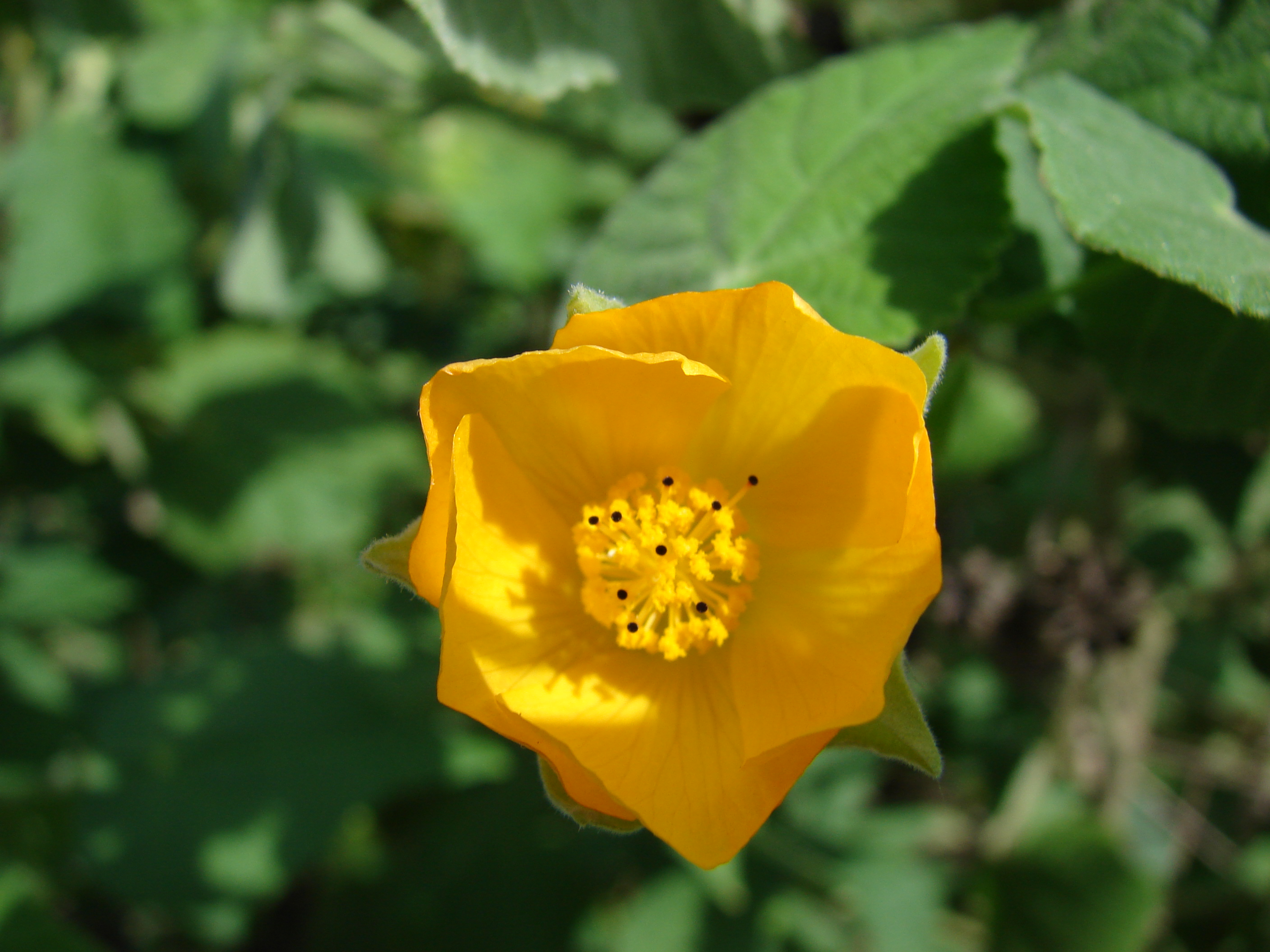
- Abutilon grandifolium

Scientific classification
- Kingdom: Plantae
- Clade: Tracheophytes
- Clade: Angiosperms
- Clade: Eudicots
- Clade: Rosids
- Order: Malvales
- Family: Malvaceae
- Subfamily: Malvoideae
- Tribe: Malveae

Genera
- See text

= Malveae =

Tribe of flowering plants

Malveae is a tribe of flowering plants in the mallow family Malvaceae, subfamily Malvoideae. The tribe circumscribes approximately 70 genera and 1040 species and has the greatest species diversity out the three tribes that make up Malvoideae (followed by Hibisceae and then Gossypieae). The flowers of Malveae are five-merous with a characteristic staminal column, a trait found throughout Malvoideae. Although there are not many economically important species within Malveae, the tribe includes Althaea officinalis, otherwise known as the marsh-mallow.

The fruits of Malveae are generally schizocarpic, although some are functionally capsular. The tribe generally includes herbaceous plants, although Robinsonella are trees. The tribe is a well supported monophyletic group, supported by chloroplast and ribosomal DNA. Within Malvoideae, Malveae forms a monophyletic clade with Gossypieae, sister to Hibisceae. Malveae species are primarily found in the Americas, although genera within the tribe are also found in Eurasia, Australia, and Africa.

The intergeneric relationships within Malveae are not well resolved. The tribe was originally split between Eumalveae, Malopeae, Sideae and Abutileae based on carpel arrangement, ovule numbers and the flowers' stigmatic arrangements, however, now Malveae is generally grouped into 14 alliances (Abutilon, Batesimalva, Kearnemalvastrum, Malvastrum, Sphaeralcea, Modiola, Anoda, Gaya, Malope, Anisodontea, Malva, Sidalcea, Malacothamnus and Plagianthus). Recent ribosomal sequencing, however, suggests that these alliances are non monophyletic and may be better characterized by the presence or absence of involucre bracts (i.e., an epicalyx). No new phylogenies have yet been proposed.

== Genera ==
The following genera are recognized and as grouped from Bayer & Kubitzki(2003):

Alliance	Genera
Abutilon	Neobaclea, Corynabutilon, Tetrasida, Hochreutinera, Abutilon, Billieturnera, Pseudabutilon, Allowissadula, Wissadula, Bastardiastrum, Bastardia, Herissantia, Bastardiopsis, Robinsonella, Akrosida, Dendrosida, Allosidastrum, Rhynchosida, Krapovickasia, Malvella, Meximalva, Sidastrum, Sida
Anisodontea	Anisodontea
Anoda	Anoda, Periptera
Batesimalva	Batesimalva, Horsfordia, Briquetia, Fryxellia, Bakeridesia
Gaya	Gaya, Cristaria, Lecanophora
Kearnemalvastrum	Kearnemalvastrum
Malacothamnus	Phymosia, Malacothamnus, Neobrittonia, Iliamna
Malope	Kitaibelia, Malope
Malva	Alcea, Althaea, Malva, Lavatera
Modiola	Modiola, Modiolastrum
Malvastrum	Malvastrum
Plagianthus	Hoheria, Lawrencia, Plagianthus
Sidalcea	Callirhoe, Sidalcea
Sphaeralcea	Sphaeralcea, Tarasa, Fuertesimalva, Calyculogygas, Monteiroa, Calyptraemalva, Napaea, Eremalche, Sidasodes, Acaulimalva, Palaua, Nototriche

- Abutilon Mill.
- Acaulimalva Krapov.
- Akrosida Fryxell & Fuertes
- Alcea L.
- Allosidastrum (Hochr.) Krapov. et al.
- Allowissadula Bates
- Althaea L.
- Anisodontea C.Presl
- Anoda Cav.
- Asterotrichion Klotzsch
- Bakeridesia Hochr.
- Bastardia Kunth
- Bastardiastrum (Rose) D. M. Bates
- Bastardiopsis (K.Schum.) Hassl.
- Batesimalva Fryxell
- Billieturnera Fryxell
- Briquetia Hochr.
- Callianthe Donnell (2012)
- Callirhoe Nutt.
- Calyculogygas Krapov.
- Calyptraemalva Krapov.
- Corynabutilon (K.Schum.) Kearney
- Cristaria Cav.
- Dendrosida Fryxell
- Dirhamphis Krapov.
- Eremalche Greene
- Fryxellia D.M.Bates
- Fuertesimalva Fryxell
- Gaya Kunth
- Gynatrix Alef.
- Herissantia Medik.
- Hochreutinera Krapov.
- Hoheria A.Cunn.
- Horsfordia A.Gray
- Iliamna Greene
- Kearnemalvastrum D.M.Bates
- Kitaibelia Willd.
- Krapovickasia Fryxell
- Lawrencia Hook.
- Lecanophora Speg.
- Malacothamnus Greene
- Malope L.
- Malva L.
- Malvastrum A.Gray
- Malvella Jaub. & Spach
- Meximalva Fryxell
- Modiola Moench
- Modiolastrum K.Schum.
- Monteiroa Krapov.
- Napaea L.
- Neobaclea Hochr.
- Neobrittonia Hochr.
- Nototriche Turcz.
- Palaua Cav.
- Periptera DC.
- Phymosia Desv. ex Ham.
- Plagianthus J.R.Forst. & G.Forst.
- Pseudabutilon R.E.Fr.
- Rhynchosida Fryxell
- Robinsonella Rose & Baker f.
- Sida L.
- Sidalcea A.Gray
- Sidasodes Fryxell & Fuertes
- Sidastrum Baker f.
- Sphaeralcea A.St.-Hil.
- Tarasa Phil.
- Tetrasida Ulbr.
- Wissadula Medik.
