= Gossypioides kirkii =

Scientific classification
- Kingdom: Plantae
- Clade: Embryophytes
- Clade: Tracheophytes
- Clade: Angiosperms
- Clade: Eudicots
- Clade: Rosids
- Order: Malvales
- Family: Malvaceae
- Genus: Gossypioides
- Species: G. kirkii

Binomial name
- Gossypioides kirkii (Mast.) Skovst. ex J.B.Hutch.

Synonyms
- Homotypic Synonyms: Gossypium kirkii Mast.; Heterotypic Synonyms: Gossypium kirkii subsp. brevilanatum B.L.Rob.; Gossypium kirkii subsp. scandens Roberty

Species of flowering plant

Gossypioides kirkii is a species of flowering plant in the family Malvaceae. It is native to Kenya, Mozambique, Tanzania and South Africa.
