= Palaua =

Palaua may refer to:

- Palaua (plant), a plant genus in the family Actinidiaceae
- Palaua (gastropod), a land snail genus in the family Euconulidae
- Palaua, a genus of flatworms in the family Palauidae.
