= Monteiroa =

Monteiroa may refer to:

- Monteiroa (katydid), a genus of katydids in the family Tettigoniidae
- Monteiroa (plant), a genus of plants in the family Malvaceae
