= × Malvalthaea =

Scientific classification
- Kingdom: Plantae
- Clade: Embryophytes
- Clade: Tracheophytes
- Clade: Spermatophytes
- Clade: Angiosperms
- Clade: Eudicots
- Clade: Rosids
- Order: Malvales
- Family: Malvaceae
- Tribe: Malveae
- Genus: × Malvalthaea; Iljin

Genus of flowering plants

× Malvalthaea is a genus of flowering plants in the family Malvaceae, a hybrid of the genera Althaea and Malva. It includes three species native to the Caucasus, Iran, and Turkmenistan:

- × Malvalthaea heterophylla I.Riedl
- × Malvalthaea palmata I.Riedl
- × Malvalthaea transcaucasica (Sosn.) Iljin
