= Horsfordia alata =

Scientific classification
- Kingdom: Plantae
- Clade: Tracheophytes
- Clade: Angiosperms
- Clade: Eudicots
- Clade: Rosids
- Order: Malvales
- Family: Malvaceae
- Genus: Horsfordia
- Species: H. alata

Binomial name
- Horsfordia alata (S.Watson) A.Gray

Species of flowering plant

Horsfordia alata, with the common names pink velvet mallow and pink velvetmallow, is a shrubby desert plant in the mallow family (Malvaceae).

== Distribution ==
The plant is endemic to the Sonoran Desert ecoregion, in the Colorado Desert sub-ecoregion of southern California and in southwestern Arizona; and in Sonora and Baja California states of northwestern Mexico.

It grows in creosote bush scrub habitats, at elevations of 100–600 metres (330–1,970 ft).

== See also ==
- Flora of the Sonoran Desert
- Natural history of the Colorado Desert
