= Lecanophora =

Lecanophora may refer to:

- Lecanophora (beetle), a genus of beetles in the family Curculionidae
- Lecanophora (plant), a genus of plants in the family Malvaceae
