= Tarasa =

Tarasa may refer to:

- Tarasa (plant), a genus of flowering plants in the family Malvaceae
- Tarasa (village), a village in Bokhansky District, Russia
- Tarasa (river), a river in Irkutsk Oblast, Russia
