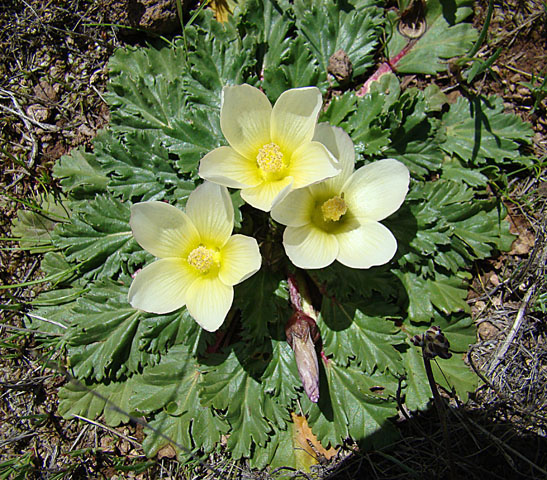
- Acaulimalva sulphurea

Scientific classification
- Kingdom: Plantae
- Clade: Tracheophytes
- Clade: Angiosperms
- Clade: Eudicots
- Clade: Rosids
- Order: Malvales
- Family: Malvaceae
- Subfamily: Malvoideae
- Tribe: Malveae
- Genus: Acaulimalva; Krapov.

Species
- See text

= Acaulimalva =

Genus of flowering plants

Acaulimalva is a genus of plants in the family Malvaceae. It contains 21 species that are found in South America.

== Species ==
- Acaulimalva acaulis (Dombey ex Cav.) Krapov.
- Acaulimalva alismatifolia (K.Schum. & Hieron.) Krapov.
- Acaulimalva betonicifolia (A.W.Hill) Krapov.
- Acaulimalva crenata (A.W.Hill) Krapov.
- Acaulimalva dryadifolia (Solms) Krapov.
- Acaulimalva engleriana (Ulbr.) Krapov.
- Acaulimalva glandulifera Krapov.
- Acaulimalva hillii Krapov.
- Acaulimalva nubigena (Walp.) Krapov.
- Acaulimalva oriastrum (Wedd.) Krapov.
- Acaulimalva parnassiifolia (Hook.) Krapov.
- Acaulimalva pazensis Krapov.
- Acaulimalva purdiaei (A.Gray) Krapov.
- Acaulimalva purpurea (A.W.Hill) Krapov.
- Acaulimalva rauhii (Hochr.) Krapov.
- Acaulimalva rhizantha (A.Gray) Krapov.
- Acaulimalva richii (A.Gray) Krapov.
- Acaulimalva steinbachii Krapov.
- Acaulimalva stuebelii (Hieron.) Krapov.
- Acaulimalva sulphurea Krapov.
- Acaulimalva weberbaueri (Ulbr.) Krapov.
