= Hafotra =

Conservation status
- Endangered (IUCN 3.1)

Scientific classification
- Kingdom: Plantae
- Clade: Tracheophytes
- Clade: Angiosperms
- Clade: Eudicots
- Clade: Rosids
- Order: Malvales
- Family: Malvaceae
- Genus: Hafotra; Dorr (2020)
- Species: H. superba

Binomial name
- Hafotra superba (Arènes) Dorr (2020)

Synonyms
- Dombeya superba Arènes (1958)

Genus of flowering plants

Hafotra superba is a species of flowering plant in the family Malvaceae. It is the sole member of genus Hafotra. It is a shrub or small tree endemic to central Madagascar. It grows 3 to 4 meters tall.

Hafotra is native to the Atsimo-Atsinanana region in southeastern Madagascar. It grows in humid forest between 20 and 800 meters elevation.

There are three known subpopulations of unknown size. It has an estimated extent of occurrence (EOO) of 19 km^{2}, an estimated area of occupancy (AOO) of 12 km ^{2}. It may be present in Midongy du sud National Park and Manombo Special Reserve. It is threatened with habitat loss from deforestation and conversion of its habitat to agriculture, including within protected areas.
