= Krapovickasia =

Scientific classification
- Kingdom: Plantae
- Clade: Tracheophytes
- Clade: Angiosperms
- Clade: Eudicots
- Clade: Rosids
- Order: Malvales
- Family: Malvaceae
- Subfamily: Malvoideae
- Tribe: Malveae
- Genus: Krapovickasia; Fryxell

Species
- See text

Synonyms
- Physalastrum Monteiro

Genus of plants in the mallow family

Krapovickasia is a genus of flowering plants in the mallow family Malvaceae, disjunctly distributed in Mexico, Brazil, Paraguay, Uruguay and Argentina. Perennial herbs, they have yellowish to peach or faded rose colored flowers.

== Species ==
Four species are accepted.

- Krapovickasia flavescens (Cav.) Fryxell
- Krapovickasia macrodon (DC.) Fryxell
- Krapovickasia physaloides (C.Presl) Fryxell
- Krapovickasia urticifolia (A.St.-Hil.) Fryxell
