= Bordasia =

Scientific classification
- Kingdom: Plantae
- Clade: Tracheophytes
- Clade: Angiosperms
- Clade: Eudicots
- Clade: Rosids
- Order: Malvales
- Family: Malvaceae
- Genus: Bordasia; Krapov. (2003)
- Species: B. bicornis

Binomial name
- Bordasia bicornis Krapov. (2003)

Genus of flowering plants

Bordasia bicornis is a species of flowering plant belonging to the family Malvaceae. It is the sole species in genus Bordasia. It is endemic to Paraguay.
