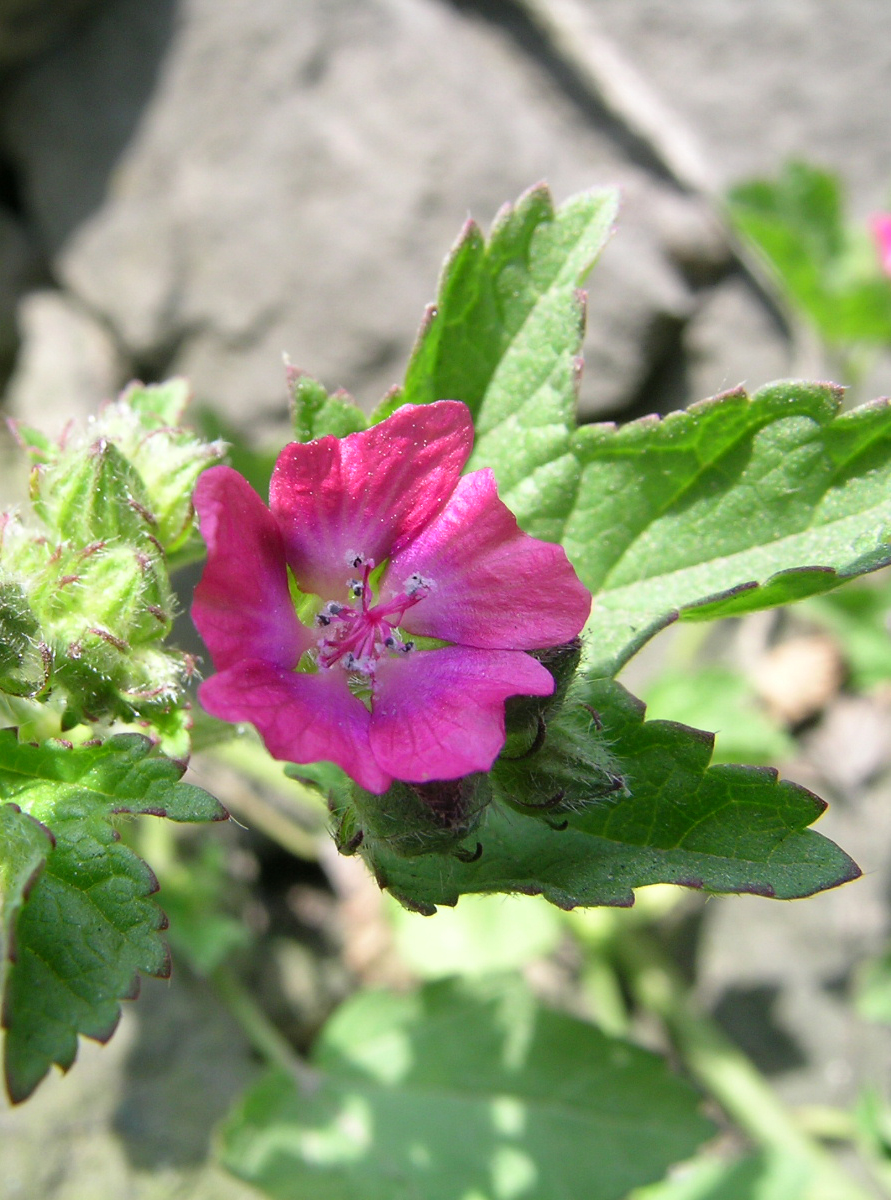
- Fuertesimalva peruviana

Scientific classification
- Kingdom: Plantae
- Clade: Tracheophytes
- Clade: Angiosperms
- Clade: Eudicots
- Clade: Rosids
- Order: Malvales
- Family: Malvaceae
- Subfamily: Malvoideae
- Tribe: Malveae
- Genus: Fuertesimalva; Fryxell

Species
- See text

= Fuertesimalva =

Genus of plants in the mallow family

Fuertesimalva is a genus of flowering plants in the mallow family Malvaceae, native to Mexico, Venezuela, Colombia, Ecuador, Bolivia, Peru and Argentina. Most species in this genus were originally placed in Urocarpidium.

== Species ==
16 species are accepted.

- Fuertesimalva chilensis (A.Braun & C.D.Bouché) Fryxell
- Fuertesimalva corniculata (Krapov.) Fryxell
- Fuertesimalva echinata (C.Presl) Fryxell
- Fuertesimalva insularis (Kearney) Fryxell
- Fuertesimalva jacens (S.Watson) Fryxell
- Fuertesimalva killipii (Krapov.) Fryxell
- Fuertesimalva leptocalyx (Krapov.) Fryxell
- Fuertesimalva limensis (L.) Fryxell
- Fuertesimalva macrocarpa (Krapov.) Krapov.
- Fuertesimalva multilobata Krapov.
- Fuertesimalva pennellii (Ulbr.) Fryxell
- Fuertesimalva pentacocca (Krapov.) Fryxell
- Fuertesimalva pentandra (K.Schum.) Fryxell
- Fuertesimalva peruviana (L.) Fryxell
- Fuertesimalva sanambrosiana (D.M.Bates) Fryxell
- Fuertesimalva stipulata (Fryxell) Fryxell
