= Julostylis =

Scientific classification
- Kingdom: Plantae
- Clade: Tracheophytes
- Clade: Angiosperms
- Clade: Eudicots
- Clade: Rosids
- Order: Malvales
- Family: Malvaceae
- Subfamily: Malvoideae
- Tribe: Hibisceae
- Genus: Julostylis; Thwaites

Genus of flowering plants

Julostylis is a genus of flowering plants in the family Malvaceae. It includes three species native to India and Sri Lanka.

Three species are accepted.

- Julostylis ampumalensis Pradeep & Sivar.
- Julostylis angustifolia (Arn.) Thwaites
- Julostylis polyandra Ravi & Anil Kumar
