= Tropidococcus =

Scientific classification
- Kingdom: Plantae
- Clade: Tracheophytes
- Clade: Angiosperms
- Clade: Eudicots
- Clade: Rosids
- Order: Malvales
- Family: Malvaceae
- Genus: Tropidococcus; Krapov. (2003)
- Species: T. pinnatipartitus

Binomial name
- Tropidococcus pinnatipartitus (A.St.-Hil. & Naudin) Krapov. (2003)

Synonyms
- Malva pinnatipartita A.St.-Hil. & Naudin (1842); Modiolastrum pinnatipartitum (A.St.-Hil. & Naudin) Krapov. (1969)

Genus of flowering plants

Tropidococcus pinnatipartitus is a species of flowering plant in the mallow family, Malvaceae. It is an annual endemic to southern Brazil.

The species was first described as Malva pinnatipartita in 1842 by Augustin Saint-Hilaire and Charles Victor Naudin. In 2003 Antonio Krapovickas placed it in the new monotypic genus Tropidococcus as Tropidococcus pinnatipartitus.
