= Physodium =

Scientific classification
- Kingdom: Plantae
- Clade: Tracheophytes
- Clade: Angiosperms
- Clade: Eudicots
- Clade: Rosids
- Order: Malvales
- Family: Malvaceae
- Genus: Physodium; C.Presl (1835)

Species
- Physodium adenodes (Goldberg) Fryxell; Physodium corymbosum (DC.) C.Presl

Genus of plants

Physodium is a genus of flowering plants in the family Malvaceae. It includes two species which are endemic to Mexico.

The genus was described in 1835 by Carl Borivoj Presl.

== Species ==
Two species are accepted:

- Physodium adenodes (Goldberg) Fryxell – northwestern, northeastern, central, and southwestern Mexico
- Physodium corymbosum (DC.) C.Presl – central and western Mexico
