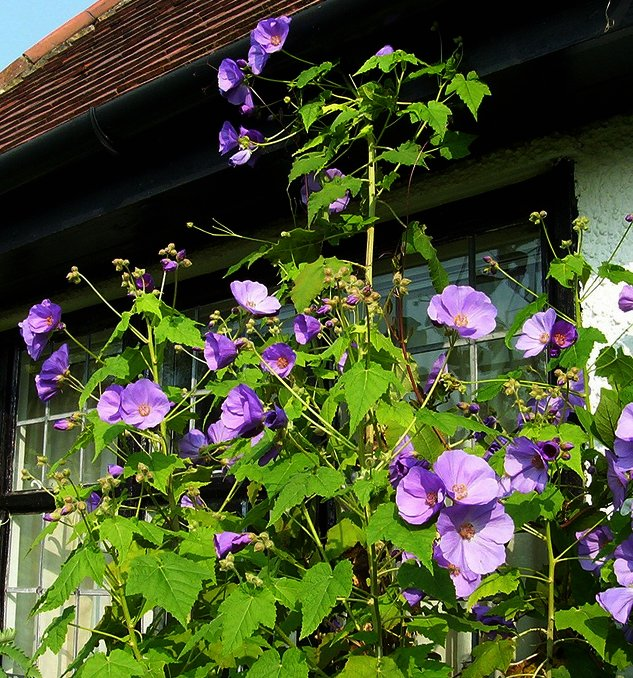
- Corynabutilon vitifolium

Scientific classification
- Kingdom: Plantae
- Clade: Embryophytes
- Clade: Tracheophytes
- Clade: Spermatophytes
- Clade: Angiosperms
- Clade: Eudicots
- Clade: Rosids
- Order: Malvales
- Family: Malvaceae
- Subfamily: Malvoideae
- Tribe: Malveae
- Genus: Corynabutilon (K.Schum.) Kearney

Species
- See text

= Corynabutilon =

Genus of flowering plants

Corynabutilon is a genus of flowering plants in the family Malvaceae, native to southern Chile and Argentina. They are shrubs or small trees.

== Species ==
Currently accepted species include:

- Corynabutilon bicolor (Phil. ex K.Schum.) Kearney
- Corynabutilon ceratocarpum (Hook. & Arn.) Kearney
- Corynabutilon hirsutum (Phil.) A.Martic.
- Corynabutilon ochsenii (Phil.) Kearney
- Corynabutilon salicifolium (Reiche) Krapov.
- Corynabutilon viride (Phil.) A.Martic.
- Corynabutilon vitifolium (Cav.) Kearney
