= Helicteropsis =

Scientific classification
- Kingdom: Plantae
- Clade: Tracheophytes
- Clade: Angiosperms
- Clade: Eudicots
- Clade: Rosids
- Order: Malvales
- Family: Malvaceae
- Subfamily: Malvoideae
- Tribe: Hibisceae
- Genus: Helicteropsis; Hochr.
- Species: H. microsiphon

Binomial name
- Helicteropsis microsiphon (Baill.) Hochr.

Synonyms
- Helicteropsis perrieri Hochr.; Hibiscus microsiphon Baill. (1885) (species basionym)

Genus of plants

Helicteropsis is a genus of flowering plants belonging to the family Malvaceae. It includes a single species, Helicteropsis microsiphon, which is native to Madagascar.

The species was first described as Hibiscus microsiphon by Henri Ernest Baillon in 1885. In 1925 Bénédict Pierre Georges Hochreutiner described the genus Helicteropsis with a single species, Helicteropsis perrieri. In 1955 Hochreutiner synonimized the two species as Helicteropsis microsiphon.
