= Bastardiastrum =

Scientific classification
- Kingdom: Plantae
- Clade: Tracheophytes
- Clade: Angiosperms
- Clade: Eudicots
- Clade: Rosids
- Order: Malvales
- Family: Malvaceae
- Subfamily: Malvoideae
- Tribe: Malveae
- Genus: Bastardiastrum (Rose) D.M.Bates

Species
- See text

Synonyms
- Wissadula sect. Bastardiastrum Rose

Genus of plants in the mallow family

Bastardiastrum is a genus of flowering plants in the mallow family Malvaceae and is native to Mexico. They are shrubs or subshrubs with viscid (and usually malodorous) stems.

== Species ==
Eight species are currently accepted.

- Bastardiastrum batesii Fryxell & S.D.Koch
- Bastardiastrum cinctum (Brandegee) D.M.Bates
- Bastardiastrum gracile (Hochr.) D.M.Bates
- Bastardiastrum hirsutiflorum (C.Presl) D.M.Bates
- Bastardiastrum incanum (Brandegee) D.M.Bates
- Bastardiastrum tarasoides Fryxell
- Bastardiastrum tricarpellatum (B.L.Rob. & Greenm.) D.M.Bates
- Bastardiastrum wissaduloides (Baker f.) D.M.Bates
