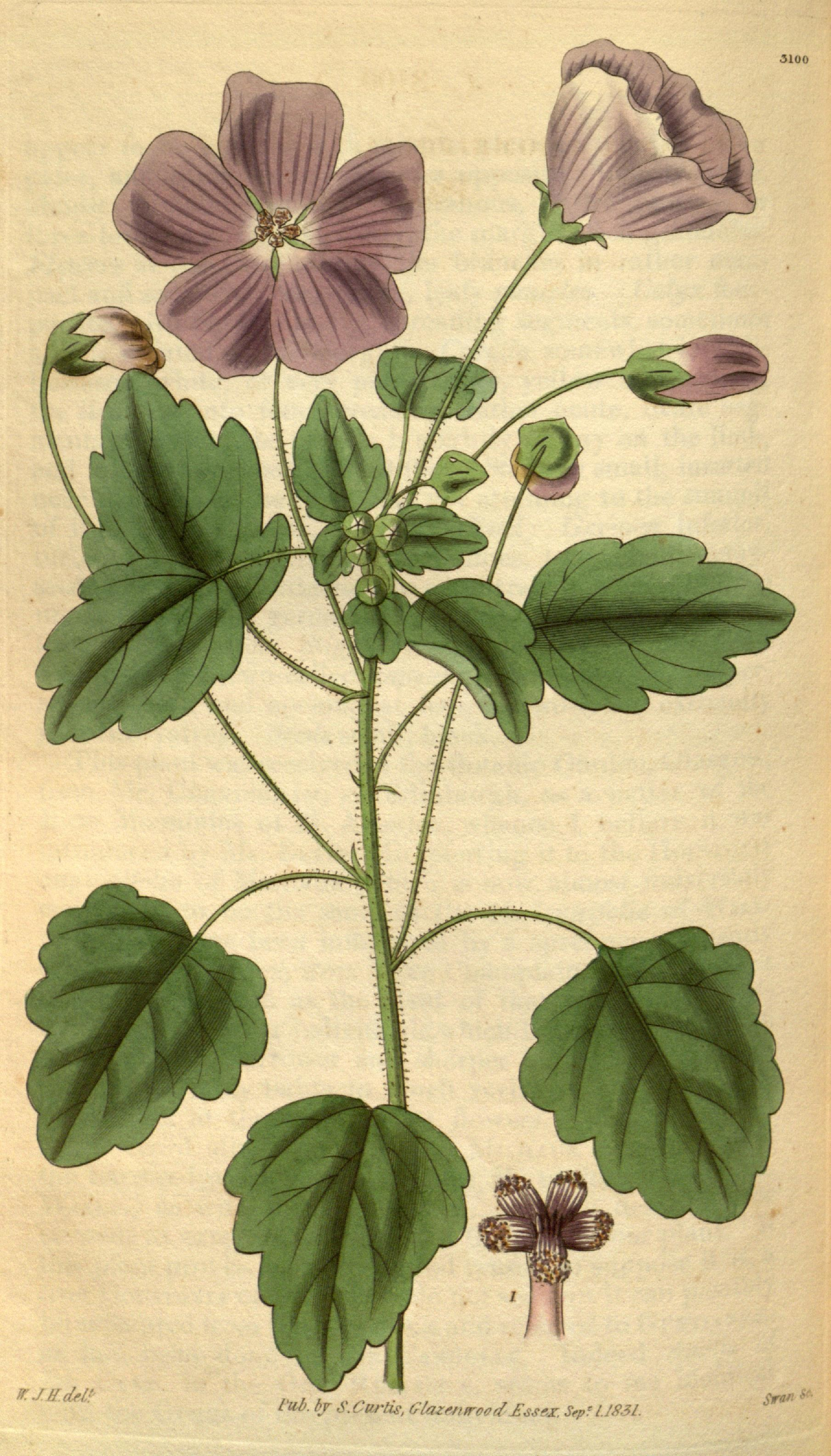
- Palaua rhombifolia

Scientific classification
- Kingdom: Plantae
- Clade: Tracheophytes
- Clade: Angiosperms
- Clade: Eudicots
- Clade: Rosids
- Order: Malvales
- Family: Malvaceae
- Subfamily: Malvoideae
- Tribe: Malveae
- Genus: Palaua; Pav.

Species
- See Text

Synonyms
- Palava Juss.

= Palaua (plant) =

Genus of flowering plants

Palaua is a genus of malvaceous plants native to the Andes. It shares with Malope and Kitaibelia the property of possessing capitate schizocarps, and was formerly classified with them in a subfamily Malopoideae or tribe Malopeae. It is now considered to be more closely related to Sphaeralcea, and to other Andean mallows.

It is native to Peru and northern Chile.

The genus name of Palaua is in honour of Antonio Palau y Verdera (1734–1793), a Spanish naturalist. It was first described and published in Diss. Vol.1 on page 40 in 1785.

== Known species ==
According to Kew,

- Palaua camanensis Ferreyra & Chanco
- Palaua concinna (Phil.) I.M.Johnst.
- Palaua dissecta Benth.
- Palaua guentheri Bruns
- Palaua inconspicua I.M.Johnst.
- Palaua malvifolia Cav.
- Palaua modesta (Phil.) Reiche & Johow
- Palaua mollendoensis Ulbr.
- Palaua moschata Cav.
- Palaua pusilla Ulbr.
- Palaua rhombifolia Graham
- Palaua sandemanii (Sandwith) Fryxell
- Palaua tomentosa Hochr.
- Palaua trisepala Hochr.
- Palaua velutina Ulbr. & A.W.Hill
- Palaua weberbaueri Ulbr.

The genus is recognised by United States Department of Agriculture and the Agricultural Research Service, but they only accept the following species; Palaua biserrata, Palaua glabra, Palaua lanceolata, Palaua scabra and Palaua tomentosa.
