= Allobriquetia =

Scientific classification
- Kingdom: Plantae
- Clade: Tracheophytes
- Clade: Angiosperms
- Clade: Eudicots
- Clade: Rosids
- Order: Malvales
- Family: Malvaceae
- Genus: Allobriquetia; Bovini (2021)

Species
- Allobriquetia inermis (Fryxell) Bovini; Allobriquetia sonorae (Fryxell) Bovini; Allobriquetia spicata (Kunth) Bovini

Synonyms
- Briquetiastrum Bovini (2015), non Briquetastrum.

Genus of flowering plants

Allobriquetia is a genus of flowering plants in the family Malvaceae. It includes three species, which range from Mexico through Central America, Cuba, and northern South America as far as Bolivia, Paraguay, and southeastern Brazil.

The genus was described in 2021 by Massimo G. Bovini.

== Species ==
Three species are accepted:

- Allobriquetia inermis (Fryxell) Bovini – Mexico (Chihuahua)
- Allobriquetia sonorae (Fryxell) Bovini – Mexico (Sonora)
- Allobriquetia spicata (Kunth) Bovini – Mexico to Tropical South America, including Cuba
