= Gossypioides =

Scientific classification
- Kingdom: Plantae
- Clade: Tracheophytes
- Clade: Angiosperms
- Clade: Eudicots
- Clade: Rosids
- Order: Malvales
- Family: Malvaceae
- Subfamily: Malvoideae
- Tribe: Gossypieae
- Genus: Gossypioides; Skovst. ex J.B.Hutch.

Genus of plants

Gossypioides is a genus of flowering plants belonging to the family Malvaceae. It includes two species native to Eastern Africa, ranging from Kenya to KwaZulu-Natal and Madagascar.

Two species are accepted.

- Gossypioides brevilanatum (Hochr.) J.B.Hutch.
- Gossypioides kirkii (Mast.) Skovst. ex J.B.Hutch.
