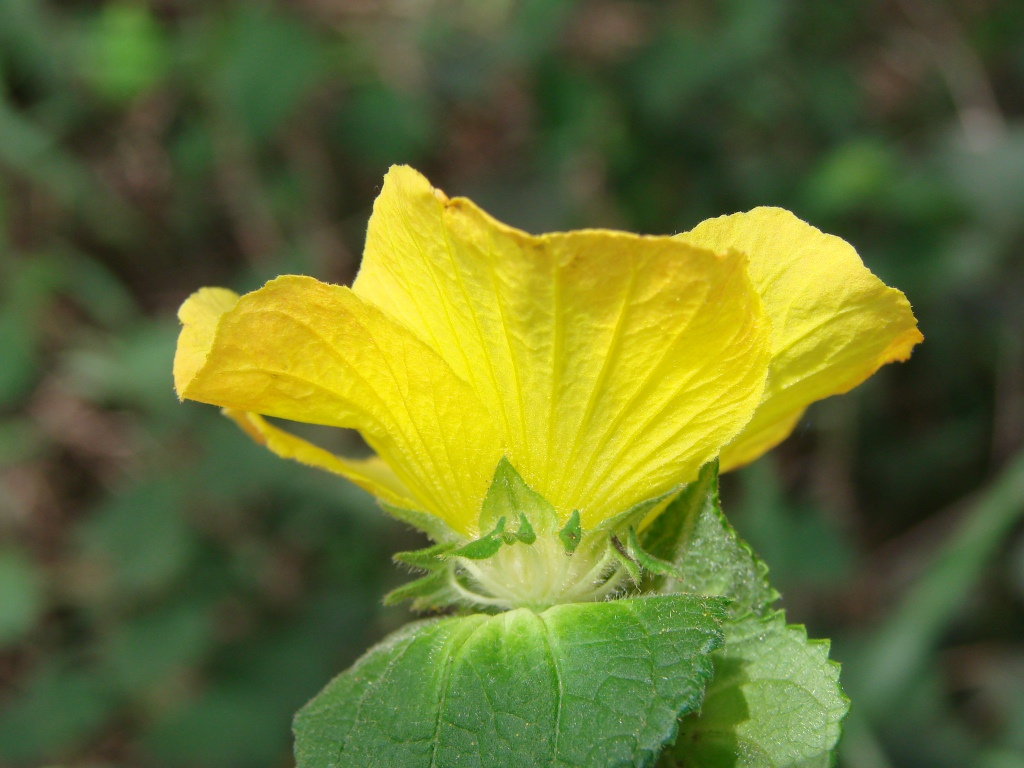
- A close-up of the flower belonging to Peltaea obsita, one of the members of the genus.

Scientific classification
- Kingdom: Plantae
- Clade: Tracheophytes
- Clade: Angiosperms
- Clade: Eudicots
- Clade: Rosids
- Order: Malvales
- Family: Malvaceae
- Subfamily: Malvoideae
- Tribe: Hibisceae
- Genus: Peltaea (C.Presl) Standl.

Synonyms
- Peltobractea Rusby; Peltostegia Turcz

= Peltaea =

Genus of plants

Peltaea is a genus of flowering plants belonging to the family Malvaceae. Its native range is southwestern Mexico to tropical South America.

== Species ==
21 species are accepted:

- Peltaea brasiliana A.J.Fernandes-Jr. & G.L.Esteves
- Peltaea chiquitana Krapov. & Cristóbal
- Peltaea edouardii (Hochr.) Krapov. & Cristóbal
- Peltaea heringeri Krapov. & Cristóbal
- Peltaea krapovickasiorum Fryxell
- Peltaea lasiantha Krapov. & Cristóbal
- Peltaea macedoi Krapov. & Cristóbal
- Peltaea nudicaulis (A.St.-Hil.) Krapov. & Cristóbal
- Peltaea obsita (Mart. ex Colla) Krapov. & Cristóbal
- Peltaea ovata (C.Presl) Standl.
- Peltaea parviflora (Turcz.) Fryxell & Krapov.
- Peltaea polymorpha (A.St.-Hil.) Krapov. & Cristóbal
- Peltaea riedelii (Gürke) Standl.
- Peltaea rupestris A.J.Fernandes-Jr. & G.L.Esteves
- Peltaea sessiliflora (Kunth) Standl.
- Peltaea speciosa (Kunth) Standl.
- Peltaea steinbachii Krapov. & Cristóbal
- Peltaea stellata A.J.Fernandes-Jr. & G.L.Esteves
- Peltaea subpandurata (C.Wright ex Griseb.) Krapov. & Cristóbal
- Peltaea surumuensis (Ulbr.) Krapov. & Cristóbal
- Peltaea trinervis (C.Presl) Krapov. & Cristóbal
