= Pochota =

Conservation status
- Least Concern (IUCN 3.1)

Scientific classification
- Kingdom: Plantae
- Clade: Embryophytes
- Clade: Tracheophytes
- Clade: Spermatophytes
- Clade: Angiosperms
- Clade: Eudicots
- Clade: Rosids
- Order: Malvales
- Family: Malvaceae
- Genus: Pochota; Ram.Goyena (1909)
- Species: P. fendleri

Binomial name
- Pochota fendleri (Seem.) W.S.Alverson & M.C.Duarte (2015)

Synonyms
- Bombacopsis fendleri (Seem.) Pittier (1916); Bombacopsis jaris Pittier (1923); Bombacopsis sepium Pittier (1923); Bombax fendleri (Seem.) Benth. ex B.D.Jacks. (1893); Bombax nicoyense Pittier (1914); Pachira fendleri Seem. (1853); Pachira bracteolata Decne. (1880); Pochota vulgaris Ram.Goyena (1909)

Species of flowering plant

Pochota fendleri, commonly known as pupumjoche, and (in Central America) as pochote, is a species of flowering plant in the family Malvaceae. It is the sole species in genus Pochota. Pochota fendleri is a tree which ranges from Central America (Belize, Honduras, El Salvador, Nicaragua, Costa Rica, and Panama) to Colombia, Venezuela, and northern Brazil (Amazonas and Roraima).

Pochota fendleri is a medium-sized or large tree which grows 10 to 35 meters (33 to 115 ft) tall. It flowers from January to April and June and August, and fruits throughout the year.

It grows mostly in lowland dry forests and seasonally humid forests, from sea level to 1,350 meters (4,430 ft) elevation.
