= Ripariosida =

Scientific classification
- Kingdom: Plantae
- Clade: Tracheophytes
- Clade: Angiosperms
- Clade: Eudicots
- Clade: Rosids
- Order: Malvales
- Family: Malvaceae
- Genus: Ripariosida; Weakley & D.B.Poind.
- Species: R. hermaphrodita

Binomial name
- Ripariosida hermaphrodita (L.) Weakley & D.B.Poind.

Synonyms
- Napaea hermaphrodita L. (1753) (species basionym); Sida hermaphrodita (L.) Rusby; Sida napaea Cav.

Genus of flowering plants

Ripariosida is a genus of flowering plants belonging to the family Malvaceae. It includes a single species, Ripariosida hermaphrodita, a perennial native to southeastern Canada (Ontario) and the east-central United States (District of Columbia, Indiana, Kentucky, Maryland, Michigan, Ohio, Pennsylvania, Virginia, and West Virginia).
