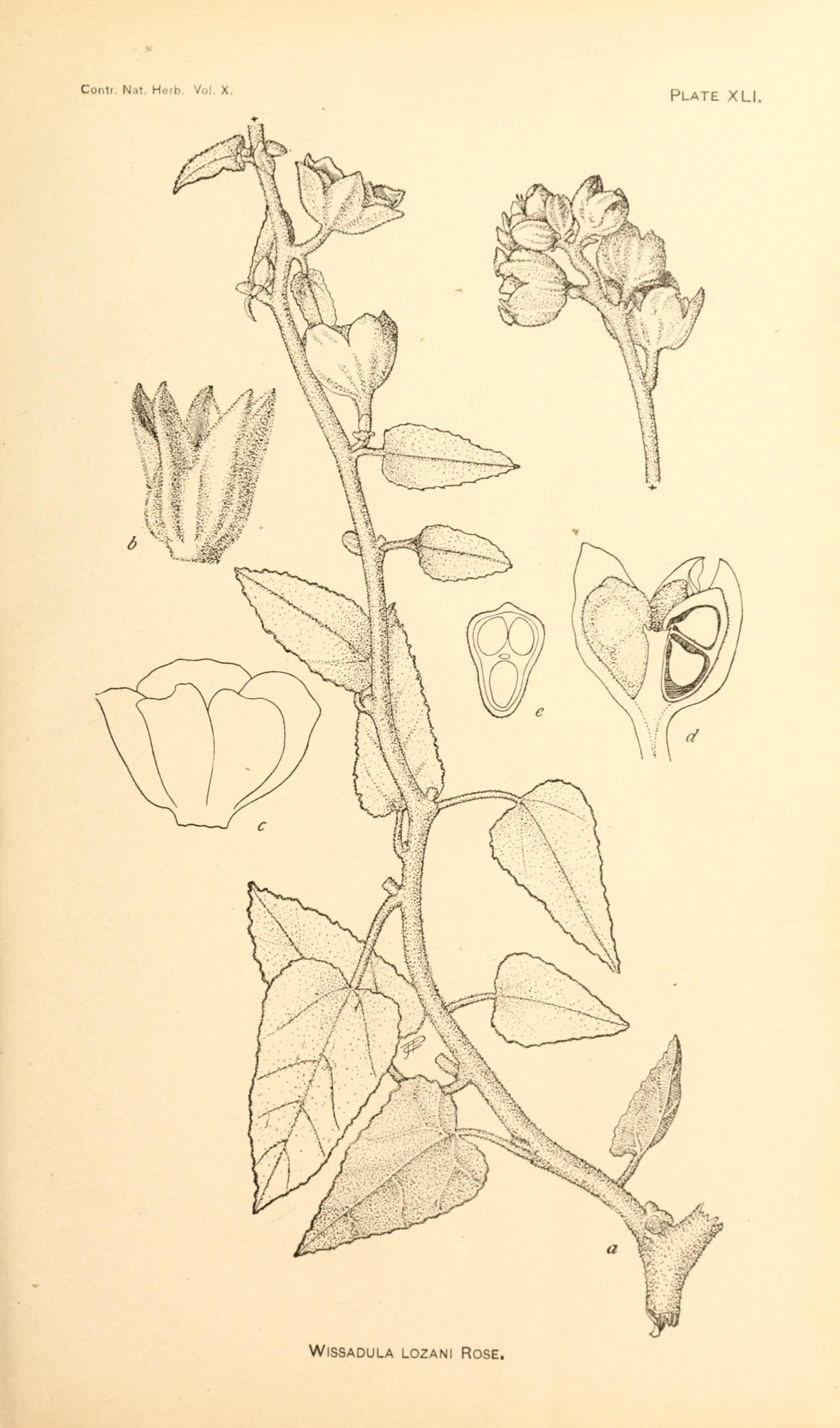
- Allowissadula lozanii

Scientific classification
- Kingdom: Plantae
- Clade: Tracheophytes
- Clade: Angiosperms
- Clade: Eudicots
- Clade: Rosids
- Order: Malvales
- Family: Malvaceae
- Subfamily: Malvoideae
- Tribe: Malveae
- Genus: Allowissadula; Bates

Species
- 10, see text

= Allowissadula =

Genus of flowering plants

Allowissadula is a genus of flowering plants in the mallow family Malvaceae. They are known commonly as false Indianmallows. They are native to Mexico and the south-central United States (Texas and New Mexico).

Plants of the genus are subshrubs with hairy foliage and flowers each having a calyx six to fourteen millimeters in length, five styles and five carpels. The fruit is a schizocarp.

== Species ==
Ten species are accepted.

- Allowissadula chiangii M.C.Johnst.
- Allowissadula floribunda (Schltdl.) Fryxell
- Allowissadula glandulosa (Rose) D.M.Bates
- Allowissadula holosericea(Scheele) D.M.Bates - Chisos Mountain false Indianmallow
- Allowissadula lozanoi (Rose) D.M.Bates - Lozano's false Indianmallow
- Allowissadula microcalyx (Rose ex R.E.Fr.) D.M.Bates
- Allowissadula pringlei (Rose) D.M.Bates
- Allowissadula racemosa (Schltdl.) Fryxell
- Allowissadula rosei (R.E.Fr.) D.M.Bates
- Allowissadula sessei (Lag.) D.M.Bates
