= Spirabutilon =

Scientific classification
- Kingdom: Plantae
- Clade: Tracheophytes
- Clade: Angiosperms
- Clade: Eudicots
- Clade: Rosids
- Order: Malvales
- Family: Malvaceae
- Genus: Spirabutilon; Krapov.
- Species: S. citrinum

Binomial name
- Spirabutilon citrinum Krapov.

Genus of plants

Spirabutilon is a monotypic genus of flowering plants belonging to the family Malvaceae. The only species is Spirabutilon citrinum.

Its native range is Southeastern Brazil.
