= Cephalohibiscus =

Conservation status
- Near Threatened (IUCN 3.1)

Scientific classification
- Kingdom: Plantae
- Clade: Tracheophytes
- Clade: Angiosperms
- Clade: Eudicots
- Clade: Rosids
- Order: Malvales
- Family: Malvaceae
- Genus: Cephalohibiscus; Ulbr. (1935)
- Species: C. peekelii

Binomial name
- Cephalohibiscus peekelii Ulbr. (1935)

Synonyms
- Thespesia peekelii (Ulbr.) Borss.Waalk. (1966)

Genus of flowering plants

Cephalohibiscus peekelii is a species of flowering plant belonging to the family Malvaceae. It is a tree native to New Guinea, the Bismarck Archipelago, and the Solomon Islands. It is the sole species in genus Cephalohibiscus. It grows in lowland rain forests from sea level to 600 meters elevation.
