= Marcanodendron =

Conservation status
- Critically Endangered (IUCN 3.1)

Scientific classification
- Kingdom: Plantae
- Clade: Tracheophytes
- Clade: Angiosperms
- Clade: Eudicots
- Clade: Rosids
- Order: Malvales
- Family: Malvaceae
- Genus: Marcanodendron; Doweld (2021)
- Species: M. codesuri

Binomial name
- Marcanodendron codesuri (Marc.-Berti) Doweld (2021)

Synonyms
- Uladendron Marc.-Berti (1971) Uladendron codesuri Marc.-Berti (1971)

Genus of flowering plants

Marcanodendron codesuri is a species of flowering plant belonging to the family Malvaceae. It is a tree native to Bolívar state in Venezuela, where it is commonly known as algodoncillo. It is the sole species in genus Marcanodendron.

It is known only from two locations in Bolívar state, in eastern Túriba and along the Caura River between Aripao and Las Trincheras. It grows in humid evergreen and deciduous forests between 30 and 50 meters elevation.

The species is assessed as critically endangered. It has been recorded in two geographic locations but can now only be found in one, and has disappeared from its type locality. It is threatened with habitat loss from human activity, and a further reduction of the species' range and population is likely if degradation of its habitat continues.
