= Pseudabutilon =

Scientific classification
- Kingdom: Plantae
- Clade: Tracheophytes
- Clade: Angiosperms
- Clade: Eudicots
- Clade: Rosids
- Order: Malvales
- Family: Malvaceae
- Tribe: Malveae
- Genus: Pseudabutilon; R.E.Fr.

Genus of flowering plants

Pseudabutilon is a genus of flowering plants in the family Malvaceae. It includes 19 species native to the Americas, ranging from the southwestern United States (Arizona and Texas) through Mexico, Central America, the Caribbean, and tropical South America to northern Argentina.

== Species ==
19 species are accepted.

- Pseudabutilon aristulosum (K.Schum.) Krapov.
- Pseudabutilon benense (Britton) Fryxell
- Pseudabutilon callimorphum (Hochr.) R.E.Fr.
- Pseudabutilon cinereum (Griseb.) Krapov.
- Pseudabutilon cowanii Fryxell
- Pseudabutilon cymosum (Triana & Planch.) Fryxell
- Pseudabutilon depauperatum (Hook.f.) Kearney
- Pseudabutilon ellipticum (Schltdl.) Fryxell
- Pseudabutilon glomeratum Fryxell
- Pseudabutilon harleyi Krapov.
- Pseudabutilon leucothrix Fryxell
- Pseudabutilon nigripunctulatum (Ulbr.) R.E.Fr.
- Pseudabutilon orientale (Standl. & Steyerm.) Fryxell
- Pseudabutilon pedunculatum (R.E.Fr.) Krapov.
- Pseudabutilon pintoi Monteiro
- Pseudabutilon scabrum (C.Presl) R.E.Fr.
- Pseudabutilon thurberi (A.Gray) Fryxell
- Pseudabutilon umbellatum (L.) Fryxell
- Pseudabutilon virgatum (Cav.) Fryxell
