= Anotea =

Scientific classification
- Kingdom: Plantae
- Clade: Tracheophytes
- Clade: Angiosperms
- Clade: Eudicots
- Clade: Rosids
- Order: Malvales
- Family: Malvaceae
- Genus: Anotea (DC.) Kunth (1847)
- Species: A. flavida

Binomial name
- Anotea flavida (DC.) Ulbr. (1915)

Synonyms
- Malvaviscus flavidus DC. (1824); Malvaviscus acerifolius C.Presl (1835)

Genus of flowering plants

Anotea flavida is a species of flowering plant belonging to the family Malvaceae. It is the sole species in genus Anotea.

It is a shrub native to central Guerrero state in southwestern Mexico.
