= Phragmocarpidium =

Scientific classification
- Kingdom: Plantae
- Clade: Tracheophytes
- Clade: Angiosperms
- Clade: Eudicots
- Clade: Rosids
- Order: Malvales
- Family: Malvaceae
- Genus: Phragmocarpidium; Krapov.
- Species: P. heringeri

Binomial name
- Phragmocarpidium heringeri Krapov.

Genus of plants

Phragmocarpidium is a genus of flowering plants belonging to the family Malvaceae. It includes a single species, Phragmocarpidium heringeri, which is native to west-central Brazil.
