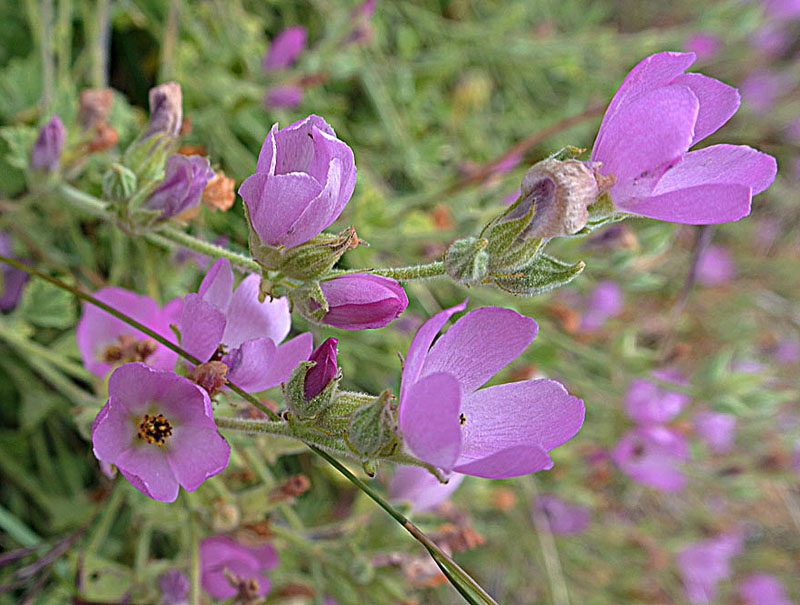

Scientific classification
- Kingdom: Plantae
- Clade: Tracheophytes
- Clade: Angiosperms
- Clade: Eudicots
- Clade: Rosids
- Order: Malvales
- Family: Malvaceae
- Genus: Andeimalva; J.A.Tate

= Andeimalva =

Genus of flowering plants

Andeimalva is a genus of flowering plants belonging to the family Malvaceae.

Its native range is Peru to Chile.

Species:

- Andeimalva chilensis (Gay) J.A.Tate
- Andeimalva machupicchensis (Krapov.) J.A.Tate
- Andeimalva mandonii (Baker f.) J.A.Tate
- Andeimalva peruviana Dorr & C.Romero
- Andeimalva spiciformis (Krapov.) J.A.Tate
