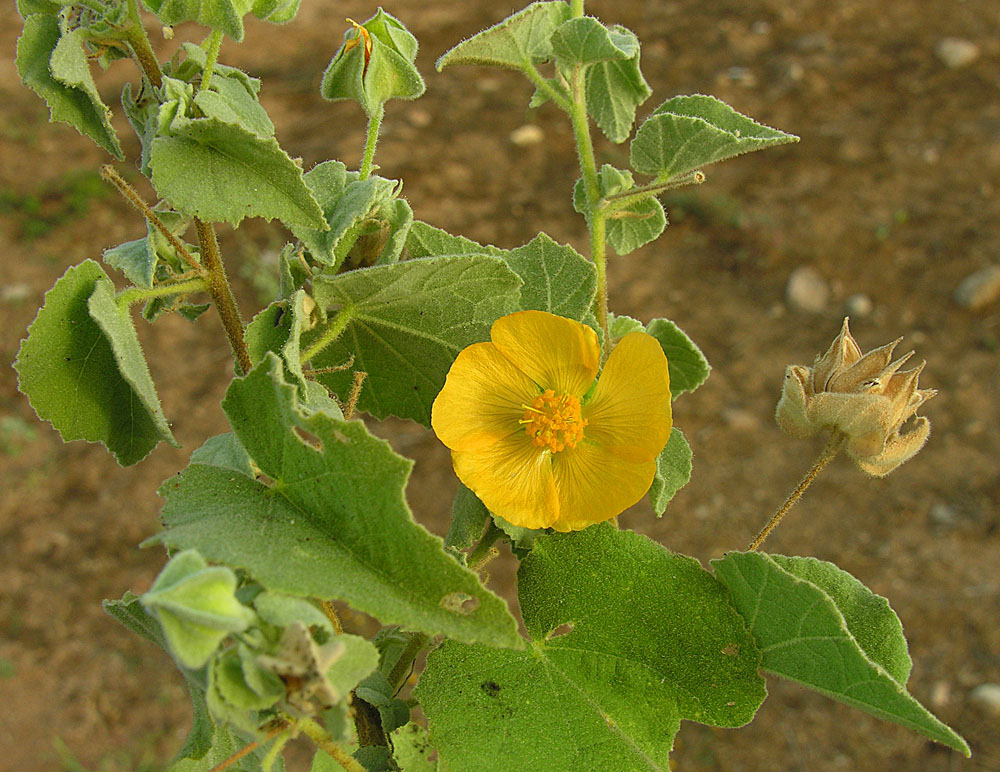
- Horsfordia newberryi

Scientific classification
- Kingdom: Plantae
- Clade: Tracheophytes
- Clade: Angiosperms
- Clade: Eudicots
- Clade: Rosids
- Order: Malvales
- Family: Malvaceae
- Tribe: Malveae
- Genus: Horsfordia; A.Gray

Species
- 4: See text

= Horsfordia =

Genus of flowering plants

Horsfordia is a small genus of flowering plants in the mallow family known commonly as velvetmallows. It includes four species which are native to northern Mexico and the southwestern United States. These are hairy subshrubs which bear light pink, lavender, or red-orange flowers.

== Species ==
Four species are accepted.

- Horsfordia alata (S.Watson) A.Gray
- Horsfordia exalata Fryxell
- Horsfordia newberryi (S.Watson) A.Gray
- Horsfordia rotundifolia S.Watson
