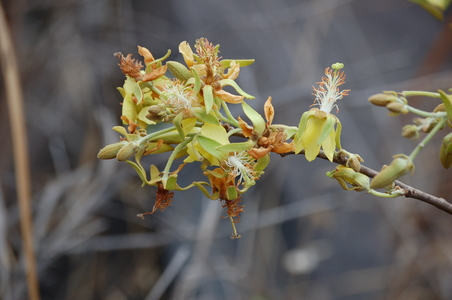
- Nayariophyton zizyphifolium

Scientific classification
- Kingdom: Plantae
- Clade: Tracheophytes
- Clade: Angiosperms
- Clade: Eudicots
- Clade: Rosids
- Order: Malvales
- Family: Malvaceae
- Genus: Nayariophyton; T.K.Paul
- Species: N. zizyphifolium

Binomial name
- Nayariophyton zizyphifolium (Griff.) D.G.Long & A.G.Mill.

Synonyms
- Dicellostyles jujubifolia Benth. & Hook.f.; Dicellostyles zizyphifolia (Griff.) Phuph.; Kydia jujubifolia Griff.; Kydia zizyphifolia Griff.

= Nayariophyton =

Species of flowering plant

Nayariophyton is a monotypic genus of flowering plants belonging to the family Malvaceae. It only contains one known species, Nayariophyton zizyphifolium.

Its native range is eastern Himalayas to southern Central China and Thailand. It is found in Assam (India), China, East Himalaya, Myanmar, Nepal and Thailand.

The genus name of Nayariophyton is in honour of Madhavan Parameswarau Nayar (1905–1978). The Latin specific epithet of zizyphifolium refers to Ziziphus and folium which refers to foliage, meaning that the plant has foliage similar to the Ziziphus plant, a genus of spiny shrubs and small trees in the buckthorn family. It was first described and published in Fasc. Fl. India Vol.19 on page 183 in 1988.
