= Dicellostyles =

Conservation status
- Critically Endangered (IUCN 2.3)

Scientific classification
- Kingdom: Plantae
- Clade: Tracheophytes
- Clade: Angiosperms
- Clade: Eudicots
- Clade: Rosids
- Order: Malvales
- Family: Malvaceae
- Tribe: Hibisceae
- Genus: Dicellostyles; Benth.
- Species: D. axillaris

Binomial name
- Dicellostyles axillaris (Thwaites) Benth. ex B.D.Jacks.

Synonyms
- Kydia axillaris Thwaites

Genus of flowering plants

Dicellostyles axillaris is a species of flowering plant in the family Malvaceae endemic to Sri Lanka. It is the only species in the genus Dicellostyles.
