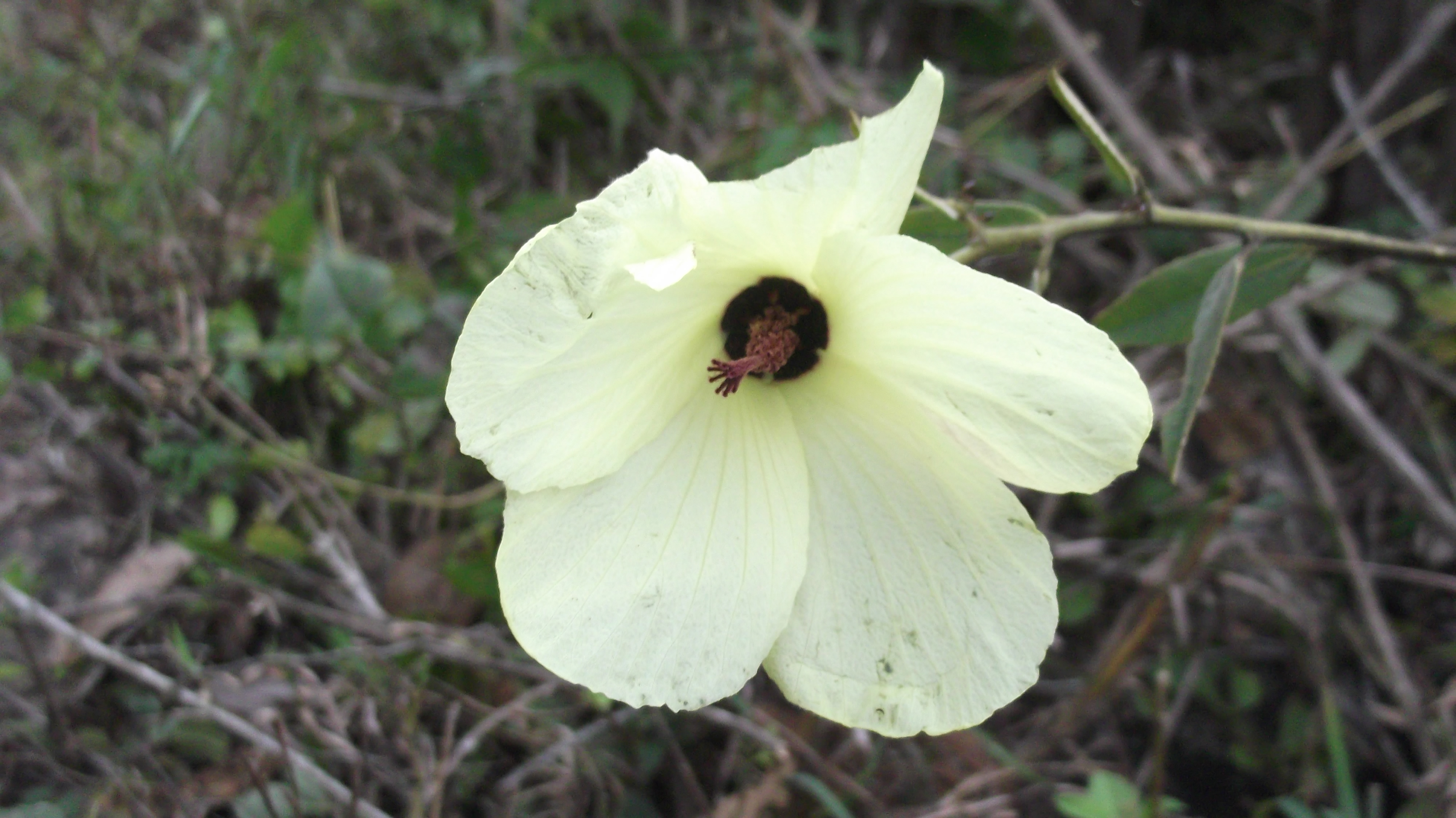
- Decaschistia crotonifolia

Scientific classification
- Kingdom: Plantae
- Clade: Tracheophytes
- Clade: Angiosperms
- Clade: Eudicots
- Clade: Rosids
- Order: Malvales
- Family: Malvaceae
- Genus: Decaschistia; Wight & Arn.

= Decaschistia =

Genus of flowering plants

Decaschistia is a genus of flowering plants belonging to the family Malvaceae.

Its native range is India to Western Malesia, Northern Australia.

Species:

- Decaschistia affinis Pierre
- Decaschistia byrnesii Fryxell
- Decaschistia crassiuscula Kurz
- Decaschistia crotonifolia Wight & Arn.
- Decaschistia cuddapahensis T.K.Paul & M.P.Nayar
- Decaschistia eximia Craib
- Decaschistia ficifolia Mart.
- Decaschistia harmandii Pierre
- Decaschistia intermedia Craib
- Decaschistia mouretii Gagnep.
- Decaschistia occidentalis A.S.Mitch. ex Craven & Fryxell
- Decaschistia peninsularis Craven & P.A.Fryxell
- Decaschistia rufa Craib
- Decaschistia thorelii Pierre
- Decaschistia trilobata Wight
