= Rojasimalva =

Scientific classification
- Kingdom: Plantae
- Clade: Tracheophytes
- Clade: Angiosperms
- Clade: Eudicots
- Clade: Rosids
- Order: Malvales
- Family: Malvaceae
- Genus: Rojasimalva; Fryxell

Species of flowering plant

Rojasimalva is a monotypic genus of flowering plants belonging to the family Malvaceae. It only contains one known species, Rojasimalva tetrahedralis Fryxell

It is native to Venezuela.

The genus name of Rojasimalva is in honour of Carmen Emilia Benítez de Rojas (b. 1937), a Venezuelan botanist, university professor. She was also a specialist in Solanaceae. The Latin specific epithet of tetrahedralis is a compound word made up of tetra meaning four, and hedra meaning face or faces. Similar to Tetrahedron (a geometric shape with four faces). Both the genus and the species were first described and published in Ernstia Vol.28 on page 11 in 1984.
