= Cenocentrum =

Scientific classification
- Kingdom: Plantae
- Clade: Tracheophytes
- Clade: Angiosperms
- Clade: Eudicots
- Clade: Rosids
- Order: Malvales
- Family: Malvaceae
- Genus: Cenocentrum; Gagnep.
- Species: C. tonkinense

Binomial name
- Cenocentrum tonkinense Gagnep.

Synonyms
- Hibiscus wangianus S.Y.Hu

Genus of flowering plants

Cenocentrum is a genus of flowering plants belonging to the family Malvaceae.

Its contains a single species, Cenocentrum tonkinense, a shrub or tree native to Indo-China and southern Yunnan.
