= Calyptraemalva =

Scientific classification
- Kingdom: Plantae
- Clade: Tracheophytes
- Clade: Angiosperms
- Clade: Eudicots
- Clade: Rosids
- Order: Malvales
- Family: Malvaceae
- Genus: Calyptraemalva; Krapov.
- Species: C. catharinensis

Binomial name
- Calyptraemalva catharinensis Krapov.

Genus of flowering plants

Calyptraemalva is a genus of flowering plants belonging to the family Malvaceae.

It contains a single species, Calyptraemalva catharinensis, a shrub native to Santa Catarina state in southern Brazil.
