= Tetrasida =

Scientific classification
- Kingdom: Plantae
- Clade: Tracheophytes
- Clade: Angiosperms
- Clade: Eudicots
- Clade: Rosids
- Order: Malvales
- Family: Malvaceae
- Genus: Tetrasida; Ulbr.

Genus of flowering plants

Tetrasida is a genus of flowering plants belonging to the family Malvaceae. Its native range is Bolivia and Peru.

== Species ==
Four species are accepted.

- Tetrasida chachapoyensis (Baker f.) Fryxell & Fuertes
- Tetrasida serrulata Fryxell & Fuertes
- Tetrasida tulla (Ulbr.) Fuertes & Fryxell
- Tetrasida weberbaueri (Ulbr.) Fryxell & Fuertes
