= Sidasodes =

Scientific classification
- Kingdom: Plantae
- Clade: Tracheophytes
- Clade: Angiosperms
- Clade: Eudicots
- Clade: Rosids
- Order: Malvales
- Family: Malvaceae
- Genus: Sidasodes; Fryxell & Fuertes

Genus of plants

Sidasodes is a genus of flowering plants belonging to the family Malvaceae.

Its native range is Western South America.

== Species ==
Species:

- Sidasodes colombiana Fryxell & Fuertes
- Sidasodes jamesonii (Baker f.) Fryxell & Fuertes
