= Dendrosida =

Scientific classification
- Kingdom: Plantae
- Clade: Tracheophytes
- Clade: Angiosperms
- Clade: Eudicots
- Clade: Rosids
- Order: Malvales
- Family: Malvaceae
- Genus: Dendrosida; J.E.Fryxell

Genus of plants

Dendrosida is a genus of flowering plants belonging to the family Malvaceae.

Its native range is Southern Mexico, Colombia to Venezuela.

Species:

- Dendrosida batesii J.E.Fryxell
- Dendrosida breedlovei Fryxell
- Dendrosida cuatrecasasii Fuertes
- Dendrosida oxypetala (Triana & Planch.) Fryxell
- Dendrosida parviflora Fryxell
- Dendrosida sharpiana (Miranda) J.E.Fryxell
