= Calyculogygas =

Scientific classification
- Kingdom: Plantae
- Clade: Tracheophytes
- Clade: Angiosperms
- Clade: Eudicots
- Clade: Rosids
- Order: Malvales
- Family: Malvaceae
- Genus: Calyculogygas; Krapov.

Genus of flowering plants

Calyculogygas is a genus of flowering plants belonging to the family Malvaceae.

It is native to southern Brazil and Uruguay.

Species:

- Calyculogygas serrana Grings
- Calyculogygas uruguayensis Krapov.
