= Briquetia =

Scientific classification
- Kingdom: Plantae
- Clade: Embryophytes
- Clade: Tracheophytes
- Clade: Spermatophytes
- Clade: Angiosperms
- Clade: Eudicots
- Clade: Rosids
- Order: Malvales
- Family: Malvaceae
- Genus: Briquetia; Hochr.

Genus of flowering plants

Briquetia is a genus of flowering plants belonging to the family Malvaceae. It includes two species native to South America, ranging from Northern Brazil to Paraguay and northwestern Argentina.

- Briquetia brasiliensis Fryxell – northern Brazil
- Briquetia denudata (Nees & Mart.) Chodat – eastern, central, and southern Brazil, Paraguay, and northeastern Argentina (Salta Province)
