= Periptera =

Scientific classification
- Kingdom: Plantae
- Clade: Tracheophytes
- Clade: Angiosperms
- Clade: Eudicots
- Clade: Rosids
- Order: Malvales
- Family: Malvaceae
- Genus: Periptera; DC.

Genus of plants

Periptera is a genus of flowering plants belonging to the family Malvaceae.

Its native range is Mexico to Guatemala.

== Species ==
Species:

- Periptera ctenotricha Fryxell
- Periptera lobelioides Fryxell & S.D.Koch
- Periptera macrostelis Rose
- Periptera punicea (Lag.) DC.
- Periptera trichostemon Bullock
