= Fryxellia =

Scientific classification
- Kingdom: Plantae
- Clade: Tracheophytes
- Clade: Angiosperms
- Clade: Eudicots
- Clade: Rosids
- Order: Malvales
- Family: Malvaceae
- Genus: Fryxellia; D.M.Bates
- Species: F. pygmaea

Binomial name
- Fryxellia pygmaea (Correll) D.M.Bates

Synonyms
- Anoda pygmaea Correll

Genus of flowering plants

Fryxellia is a monotypic genus of flowering plants belonging to the family Malvaceae. It contains only one species, Fryxellia pygmaea (Correll) D.M.Bates.

Its native range is south-western Texas to north-eastern Mexico.

The genus is named in honour of Paul Fryxell (1927–2011) an American botanist. The specific Latin epithet of pygmaea refers to pygmy or "small" in Greek. It was first described and published in Brittonia Vol.26 on page 95 in 1974.
