= Meximalva =

Scientific classification
- Kingdom: Plantae
- Clade: Tracheophytes
- Clade: Angiosperms
- Clade: Eudicots
- Clade: Rosids
- Order: Malvales
- Family: Malvaceae
- Genus: Meximalva; Fryxell

Genus of plants

Meximalva is a genus of flowering plants belonging to the family Malvaceae.

Its native range is Texas to Mexico.

== Culinary uses ==
The leaves and flowers are edible, rich in nutrients.

== Medicinal properties ==
Anti-inflammatory and laxative effects are attributed to it.

== Species ==
Species:

- Meximalva filipes (A.Gray) Fryxell
- Meximalva venusta (Schltdl.) Fryxell
