= Billieturnera =

Scientific classification
- Kingdom: Plantae
- Clade: Tracheophytes
- Clade: Angiosperms
- Clade: Eudicots
- Clade: Rosids
- Order: Malvales
- Family: Malvaceae
- Genus: Billieturnera; Fryxell (1982)
- Species: B. helleri

Binomial name
- Billieturnera helleri (Rose ex A.Heller) Fryxell (1982)

Synonyms
- Disella cuneifolia Greene (1906); Sida cuneifolia A.Gray (1850), nom. illeg.; Sida grayana Clement (1954); Sida helleri Rose ex A.Heller (1895)

Genus of flowering plants

Billieturnera helleri (common name coppery false fanpetals) is a species of flowering plants belonging to the family Malvaceae. It is the sole species in genus Billieturnera. Its native range is Texas and northeastern Mexico.
