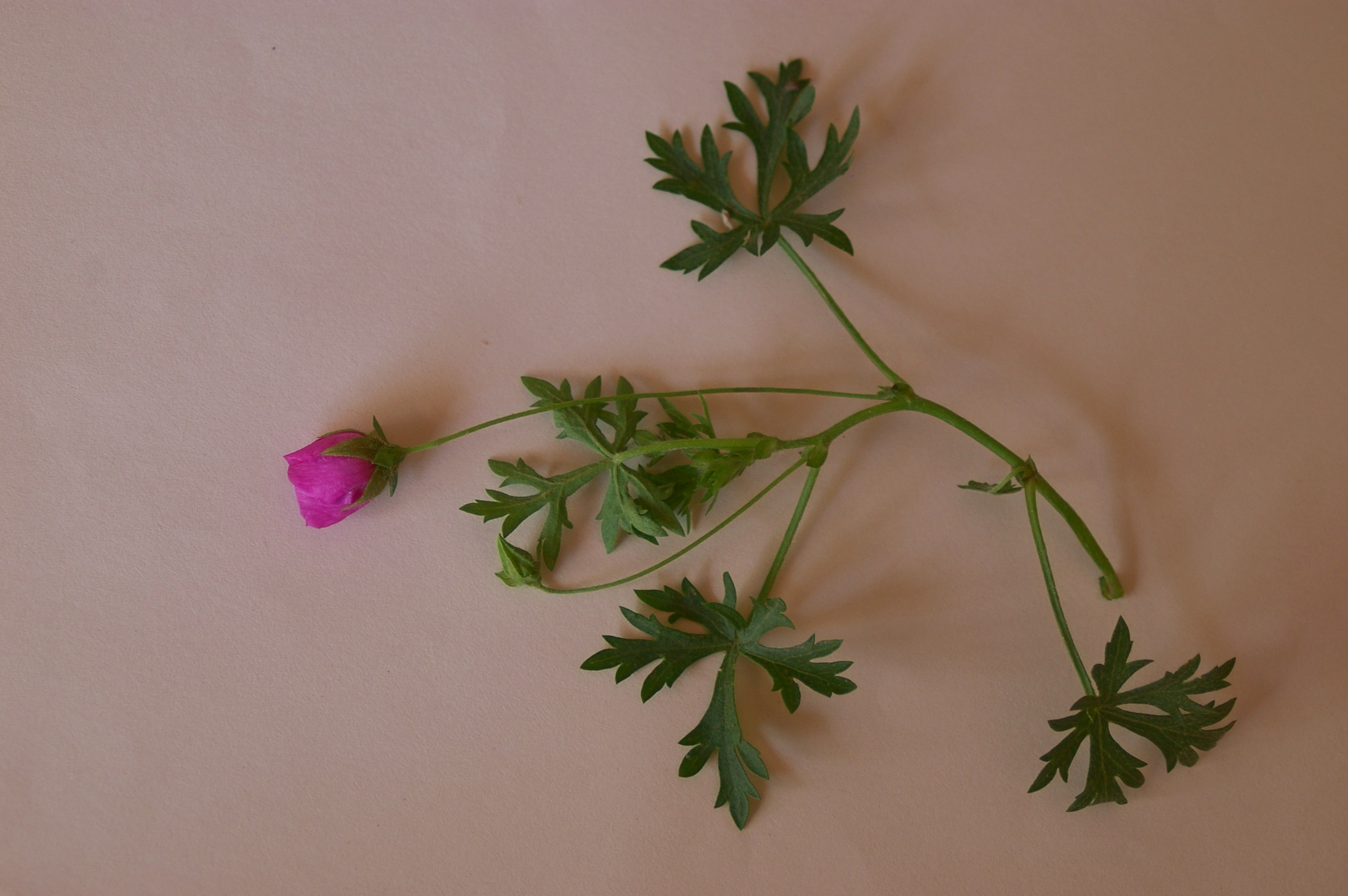
- Modiolastrum gilliesii

Scientific classification
- Kingdom: Plantae
- Clade: Tracheophytes
- Clade: Angiosperms
- Clade: Eudicots
- Clade: Rosids
- Order: Malvales
- Family: Malvaceae
- Genus: Modiolastrum; K.Schum.

= Modiolastrum =

Genus of plants

Modiolastrum is a genus of flowering plants belonging to the family Malvaceae.

Its native range is Bolivia to Southern Brazil and Northern Argentina.

== Species ==
Species:

- Modiolastrum australe Krapov.
- Modiolastrum gilliesii (Steud.) Krapov.
- Modiolastrum lateritium (Hook.) Krapov.
- Modiolastrum malvifolium (Griseb.) K.Schum.
- Modiolastrum palustre (Ekman) Krapov.
- Modiolastrum pinnatipartitum (A.St.-Hil. & Naudin) Krapov.
