= Neobrittonia =

Scientific classification
- Kingdom: Plantae
- Clade: Tracheophytes
- Clade: Angiosperms
- Clade: Eudicots
- Clade: Rosids
- Order: Malvales
- Family: Malvaceae
- Genus: Neobrittonia; Hochr.
- Species: N. acerifolia

Binomial name
- Neobrittonia acerifolia (G.Don) Hochr.

Synonyms
- Abutilon acerifolium G.Don; Abutilon discissum (Bertol.) Schltdl.; Sida acerifolia Lag.; Sida discissa Bertol.; Sida palmata Sessé & Moc.; Sida palmata DC.

Species of flowering plant

Neobrittonia is a monotypic genus of flowering plants belonging to the family Malvaceae. It only contains one known species, Neobrittonia acerifolia

Its native range is central Mexico and parts of Central America. It is found in Costa Rica, El Salvador, Guatemala, Honduras, Mexico, Nicaragua and Panamá

The genus name of Neobrittonia is in honour of Nathaniel Lord Britton (1859–1934), an American botanist and taxonomist who co-founded the New York Botanical Garden in the Bronx, New York. The Latin specific epithet of acerifolia is a compound, 'aceri-' refers to the tree/shrub species acer and -'folia' refers to foliage. Meaning the plant has foliage similar to a maple plant. Both the genus and the species were first described and published in Annuaire Conserv. Jard. Bot. Genève Vol.9 on page 184 in 1905.
