= Dirhamphis =

Scientific classification
- Kingdom: Plantae
- Clade: Tracheophytes
- Clade: Angiosperms
- Clade: Eudicots
- Clade: Rosids
- Order: Malvales
- Family: Malvaceae
- Genus: Dirhamphis; Krapov.

Genus of plants

Dirhamphis is a genus of flowering plants belonging to the family Malvaceae.

Its native range is Southern Mexico, Bolivia to Paraguay.

Species:

- Dirhamphis balansae Krapov.
- Dirhamphis mexicana Fryxell
