= Neobaclea =

Scientific classification
- Kingdom: Plantae
- Clade: Tracheophytes
- Clade: Angiosperms
- Clade: Eudicots
- Clade: Rosids
- Order: Malvales
- Family: Malvaceae
- Genus: Neobaclea; Hochr.
- Species: N. crispifolia

Binomial name
- Neobaclea crispifolia (Cav.) Krapov.

Synonyms
- Abutilon crispifolium (Cav.) Dusén; Abutilon vidalii (Phil.) Speg.; Cristaria vidalii Phil.; Neobaclea spirostegia Hochr.; Sida crispifolia Cav.; Sphaeralcea crispifolia (Cav.) Baker f.

Species of flowering plant

Neobaclea is a monotypic genus of flowering plants belonging to the family Malvaceae. It only contains one known species, Neobaclea crispifolia, a perennial or subshrub native to southern Argentina.

The genus name of Neobaclea is in honour of César Hipólito Bacle (1794–1838), a Swiss naturalist, lithographer and periodicals publisher. He also collected plants, animals, minerals and cultural materials in South America and elsewhere. The Latin specific epithet of crispifolia is a portmanteau word, with crispus referring to curled and also folia which refers to foliage. The genus was first described and published in Compt. Rend. Hebd. Séances Acad. Sci. Vol.189 on page 1300 in 1929, then the species Neobaclea crispifolia was first published in Darwiniana Vol.7 on page 108 in 1945.
