= Batesimalva =

Scientific classification
- Kingdom: Plantae
- Clade: Tracheophytes
- Clade: Angiosperms
- Clade: Eudicots
- Clade: Rosids
- Order: Malvales
- Family: Malvaceae
- Genus: Batesimalva; Fryxell

Genus of flowering plants

Batesimalva is a genus of flowering plants belonging to the family Malvaceae.

Its native range is Texas to Northern Mexico, Venezuela.

Species:

- Batesimalva killipii Krapov. ex Fryxell
- Batesimalva lobata Villarreal & Fryxell
- Batesimalva pulchella Fryxell
- Batesimalva stipulata Fryxell
- Batesimalva violacea (Rose) Fryxell
