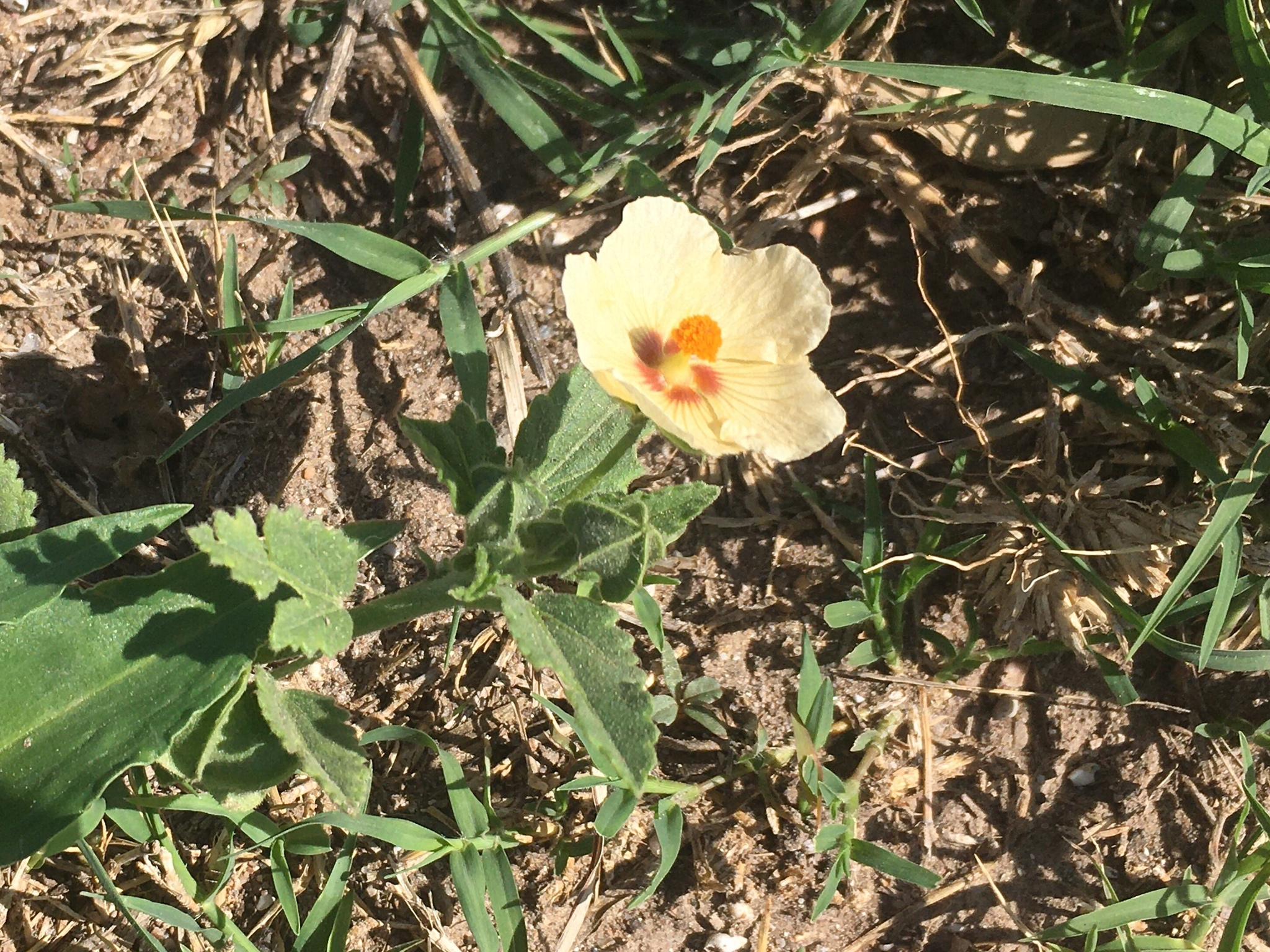
- Rhynchosida physocalyx

Scientific classification
- Kingdom: Plantae
- Clade: Tracheophytes
- Clade: Angiosperms
- Clade: Eudicots
- Clade: Rosids
- Order: Malvales
- Family: Malvaceae
- Genus: Rhynchosida; Fryxell

= Rhynchosida =

Genus of plants

Rhynchosida is a genus of flowering plants belonging to the family Malvaceae.

Its native range is Arizona to Oklahoma and Mexico, Bolivia to southern Brazil and northern Argentina.

Species:

- Rhynchosida kearneyi Fryxell
- Rhynchosida physocalyx (A.Gray) Fryxell
