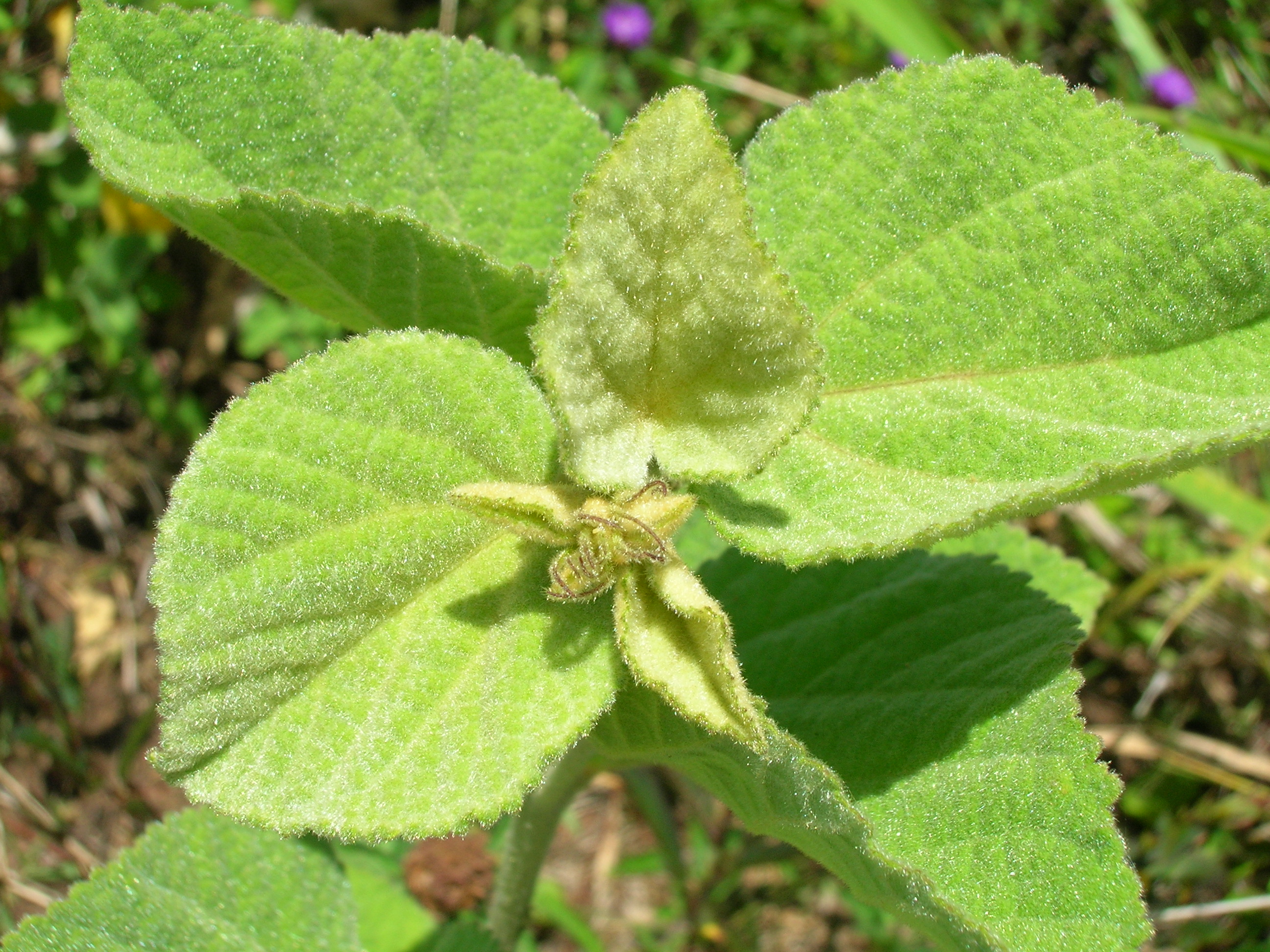
- Sidastrum micranthum (Sand mallow)

Scientific classification
- Kingdom: Plantae
- Clade: Tracheophytes
- Clade: Angiosperms
- Clade: Eudicots
- Clade: Rosids
- Order: Malvales
- Family: Malvaceae
- Genus: Sidastrum; Baker f.

= Sidastrum =

Genus of plants

Sidastrum is a genus of flowering plants belonging to the family Malvaceae.

Its native range is Tropical and Subtropical America.

== Species ==
Species:

- Sidastrum burrerense Fryxell, León de la Luz & M.Domínguez
- Sidastrum lodiegense (Baker f.) Fryxell
- Sidastrum micranthum (A.St.-Hil.) Fryxell
- Sidastrum multiflorum (Jacq.) Fryxell
- Sidastrum paniculatum (L.) Fryxell
- Sidastrum quinquenervium (Duchass. ex Triana & Planch.) Baker f.
- Sidastrum strictum (Standl.) Fryxell
- Sidastrum tehuacanum (Brandegee) Fryxell
