= Lecanophora (plant) =

Scientific classification
- Kingdom: Plantae
- Clade: Tracheophytes
- Clade: Angiosperms
- Clade: Eudicots
- Clade: Rosids
- Order: Malvales
- Family: Malvaceae
- Genus: Lecanophora; Speg.

Genus of plants

Lecanophora is a genus of flowering plants belonging to the family Malvaceae.

Its native range is Argentina to Southern Chile.

Species:

- Lecanophora ameghinoi (Speg.) Speg.
- Lecanophora chubutensis (Speg.) Rodrigo
- Lecanophora ecristata (A.Gray) Krapov.
- Lecanophora heterophylla (Cav.) Krapov.
- Lecanophora jarae (Phil.) Krapov.
- Lecanophora ruiz-lealii Krapov.
- Lecanophora subacaulis Krapov.
