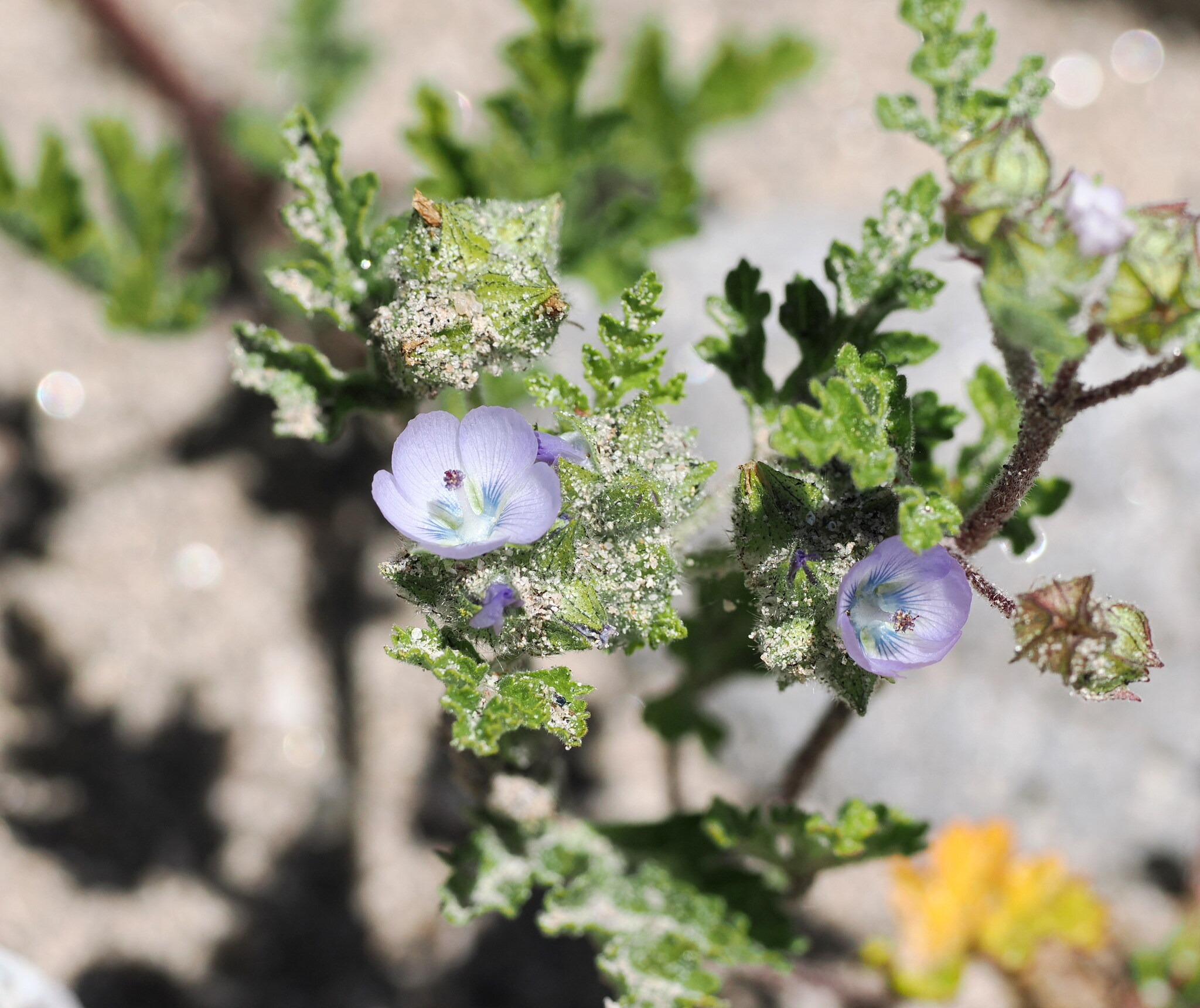
- Tarasa antofagastana

Scientific classification
- Kingdom: Plantae
- Clade: Tracheophytes
- Clade: Angiosperms
- Clade: Eudicots
- Clade: Rosids
- Order: Malvales
- Family: Malvaceae
- Genus: Tarasa; Phil.

= Tarasa (plant) =

Genus of flowering plants

Tarasa is a genus of flowering plants belonging to the family Malvaceae.

Its native range is Mexico and Peru, Bolivia, Argentina, and Chile.

== Species ==
28 species are accepted.

- Tarasa alberti Phil.
- Tarasa antofagastana (Baker f.) Krapov.
- Tarasa capitata (Cav.) D.M.Bates
- Tarasa cardenasii Krapov.
- Tarasa cerrateae Krapov.
- Tarasa congestiflora (I.M.Johnst.) Krapov.
- Tarasa corrugata Krapov.
- Tarasa geranioides (Cham. & Schltdl.) Krapov.
- Tarasa heterophylla (Griseb.) Krapov.
- Tarasa hornschuchiana (Walp.) Krapov.
- Tarasa humilis (Gillies ex Hook. & Arn.) Krapov.
- Tarasa latearistata Krapov.
- Tarasa marinii Krapov.
- Tarasa martiniana Krapov.
- Tarasa meyeri Krapov.
- Tarasa nototrichoides (Hochr.) Krapov.
- Tarasa odonellii Krapov.
- Tarasa operculata (Cav.) Krapov.
- Tarasa pediculata Krapov.
- Tarasa reichei (Phil.) Krapov.
- Tarasa rhombifolia Krapov.
- Tarasa tarapacana (Baker f.) Krapov.
- Tarasa tenella (Cav.) Krapov.
- Tarasa tenuis Krapov.
- Tarasa thyrsoidea Krapov.
- Tarasa trisecta (Griseb.) Krapov.
- Tarasa umbellata Krapov.
- Tarasa urbaniana (Ulbr.) Krapov.
