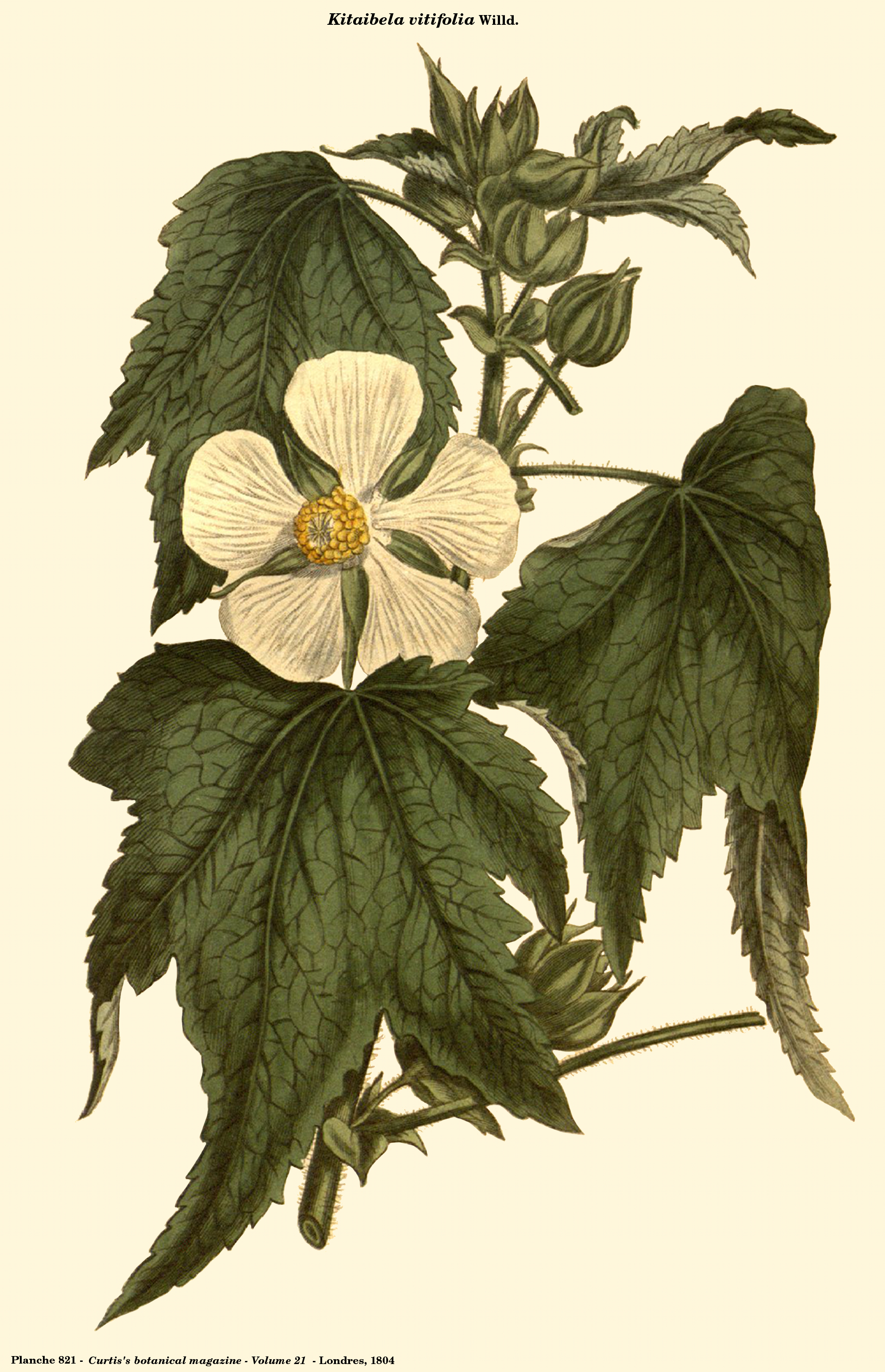
- Kitaibela vitifolia

Scientific classification
- Kingdom: Plantae
- Clade: Tracheophytes
- Clade: Angiosperms
- Clade: Eudicots
- Clade: Rosids
- Order: Malvales
- Family: Malvaceae
- Genus: Kitaibelia; Willd.

Synonyms
- Kitaibela

= Kitaibelia =

Genus of plants

Kitaibelia is a genus of flowering plants belonging to the family Malvaceae.

Its native range is Western Balkan Peninsula, Southern Turkey to Syria.

Species:

- Kitaibelia balansae Boiss.
- Kitaibelia vitifolia Willd.
