= Monteiroa (plant) =

Scientific classification
- Kingdom: Plantae
- Clade: Tracheophytes
- Clade: Angiosperms
- Clade: Eudicots
- Clade: Rosids
- Order: Malvales
- Family: Malvaceae
- Genus: Monteiroa; Krapov.

Species of flowering plant

Monteiroa is a genus of flowering plants belonging to the family Malvaceae.

Its native range is south-eastern and southern Brazil, Uruguay and north-eastern Argentina.

The genus name of Monteiroa is in honour of Honório da Costa Monteiro Filho (1900–1978), a Brazilian professor of botany and director of the national school of agriculture in Rio de Janeiro and was a specialist in Malvaceae. It was first described and published in Bol. Soc. Argent. Bot. Vol.3 on page 237 in 1951.

== Species ==
According to Kew:

- Monteiroa bullata (Ekman) Krapov.
- Monteiroa catharinensis Krapov.
- Monteiroa dusenii (Ekman) Krapov.
- Monteiroa glomerata (Hook. & Arn.) Krapov.
- Monteiroa hatschbachii Krapov.
- Monteiroa leitei Monteiro
- Monteiroa ptarmicifolia (A.St.-Hil. & Naudin) Krapov.
- Monteiroa reitzii Krapov.
- Monteiroa smithii Krapov.
- Monteiroa triangularifolia Krapov.
