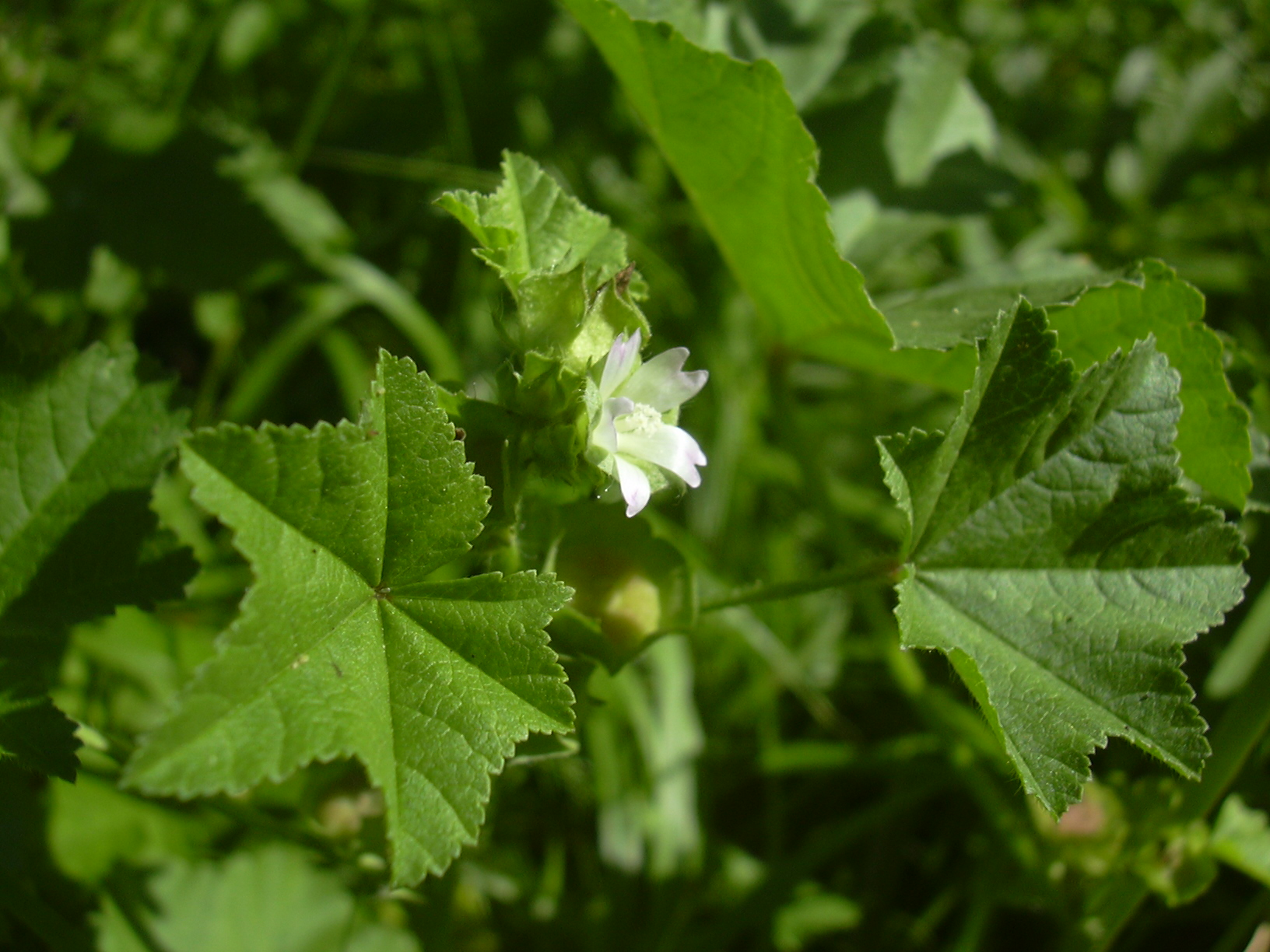
- Least mallow, Malva parviflora

Scientific classification
- Kingdom: Plantae
- Clade: Tracheophytes
- Clade: Angiosperms
- Clade: Eudicots
- Clade: Rosids
- Order: Malvales
- Family: Malvaceae; Juss.

Subfamilies
- See List of Malvaceae genera: Bombacoideae; Brownlowioideae; Byttnerioideae; Dombeyoideae; Grewioideae; Helicteroideae; Malvoideae; Sterculioideae; Tilioideae

Synonyms
- Bombacaceae Kunth; Brownlowiaceae Cheek; Byttneriaceae R.Br.; Dombeyaceae Kunth; Durionaceae Cheek; Helicteraceae J.Agardh; Hermanniaceae Marquis; Hibiscaceae J.Agardh; Lasiopetalaceae Rchb.; Melochiaceae J.Agardh; Pentapetaceae Bercht. & J.Presl; Philippodendraceae A.Juss.; Plagianthaceae J.Agardh; Sparmanniaceae J.Agardh; Sterculiaceae Vent.; Theobromataceae J.Agardh; Tiliaceae Juss.

= Malvaceae =

Malvaceae Temporal range: Campanian - recent

Family of flowering plants

Malvaceae (/mælˈveɪsi.iː, -ˌaɪ/), or the mallows, is a family of flowering plants estimated to contain 244 genera with 4225 known species. Well-known members of economic importance include cacao, cola, cotton, okra, roselle and durian. There are also some genera containing familiar ornamentals, such as Alcea (hollyhock), Malva (mallow), and Tilia (lime or linden tree). The genera with the largest numbers of species include Hibiscus (434 species), Pavonia (291 species), Sida (275 species), Ayenia (216 species), Dombeya (197 species), and Sterculia (181 species).

== Taxonomy and nomenclature ==
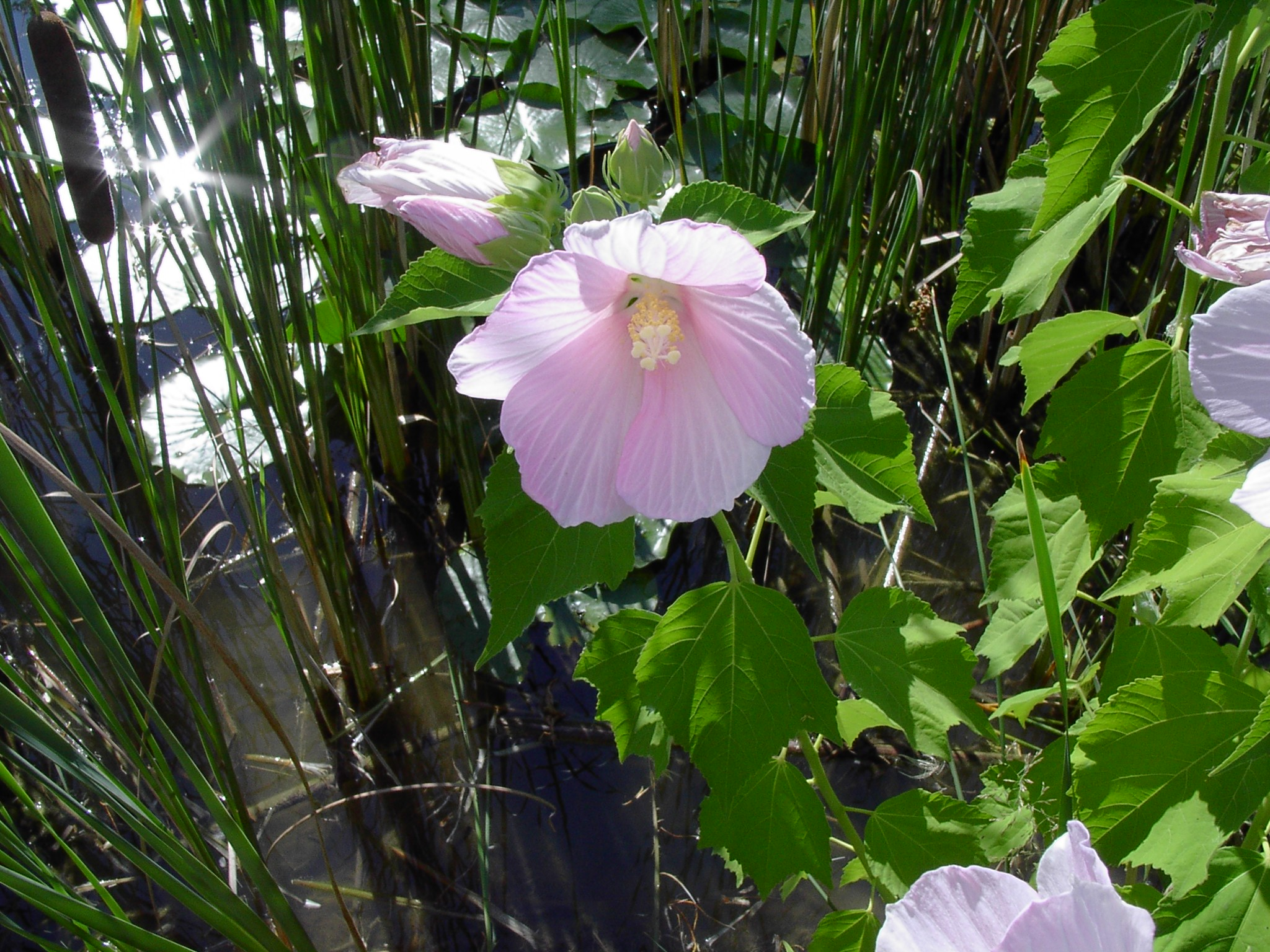
Swamp rose mallow

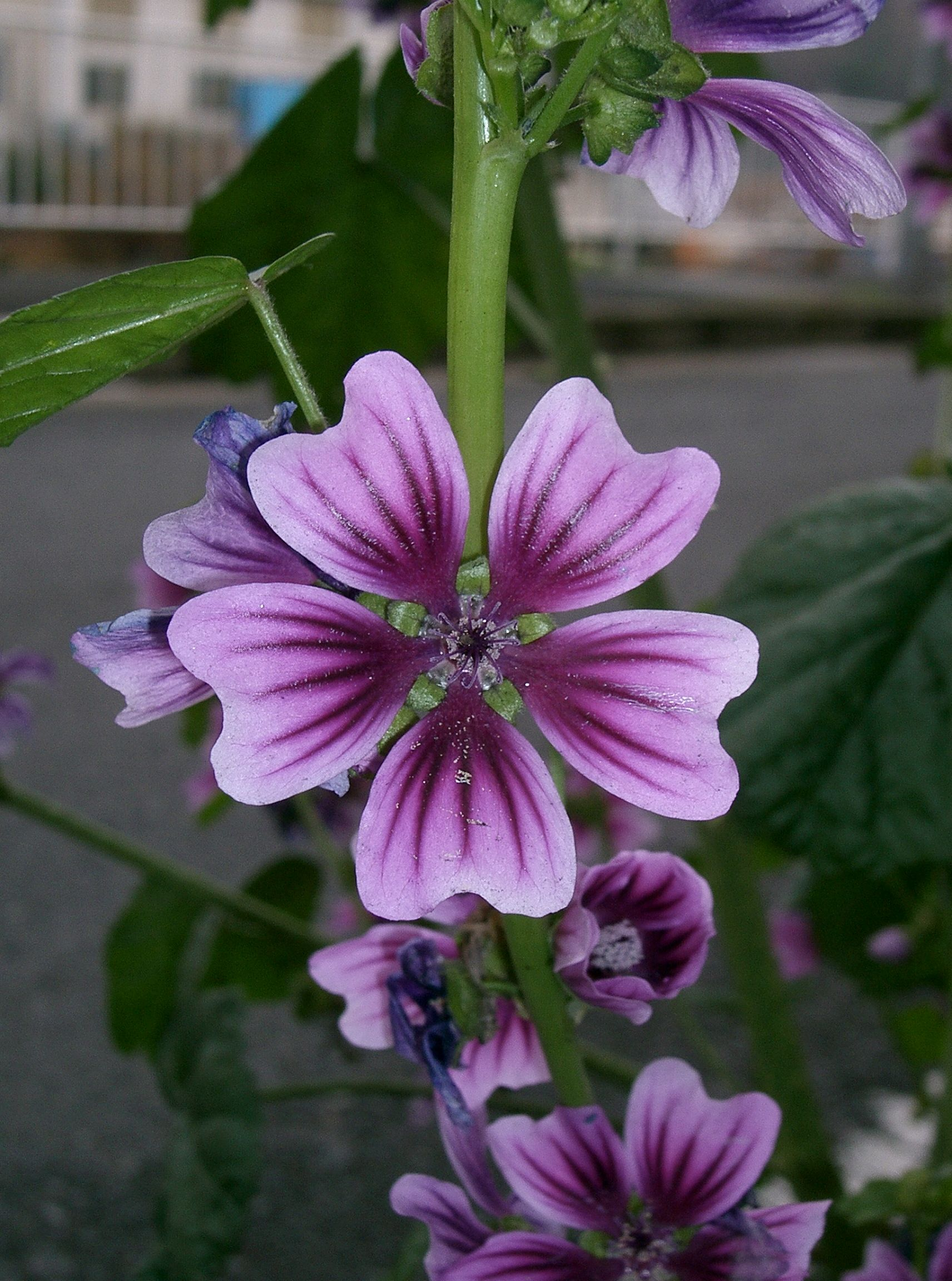
Common mallow (Malva sylvestris)

The circumscription of the Malvaceae is controversial. The traditional Malvaceae sensu stricto comprise a very homogeneous and cladistically monophyletic group. Another major circumscription, Malvaceae sensu lato, has been more recently defined on the basis that genetics studies have shown the commonly recognised families Bombacaceae, Tiliaceae, and Sterculiaceae, which have always been considered closely allied to Malvaceae s.s., are not monophyletic groups. The Malvaceae can be expanded to include all of these families so as to compose a monophyletic group. Adopting this circumscription, the Malvaceae incorporate a much larger number of genera.

=== Subfamilies ===
This article is based on the second circumscription, as presented by the Angiosperm Phylogeny Website. The Malvaceae s.l. (hereafter simply "Malvaceae") comprise nine subfamilies. A tentative cladogram of the family is shown below. The diamond denotes a poorly supported branching (<80%).

- - - Byttnerioideae: 27 genera, 650 species, pan-tropical, especially South America
    - Grewioideae: 25 genera, 770 species, "pantropical"
  - ♦
    - Sterculioideae: 14 genera, 430 species, pan-tropical
    - Tilioideae: three genera, 50 species, northern temperate regions and Central America
    - Dombeyoideae: about 20 genera, about 380 species, palaeo-tropical, especially Madagascar and Mascarenes
    - Brownlowioideae: eight genera, about 70 species, especially palaeo-tropical
    - Helicteroideae: eight to 12 genera, 10 to 90 species, tropical, especially Southeast Asia
    - ♦
      - Malvoideae: 78 genera, 1,670 species, temperate to tropical
      - Bombacoideae: 12 genera, 120 species, tropical, especially Africa and America

Until recently, relationships between these subfamilies were either poorly supported or almost completely obscure. Continuing disagreements focused primarily on the correct circumscription of these subfamilies, including the preservation of the family Bombacaceae. A study published in 2021 presented a fully resolved phylogenetic framework for Malvaceae s.l. using genomic data for all nine subfamilies.

Regarding the traditional Malvaceae s.s., the subfamily Malvoideae approximately corresponds to that group.

=== Genera ===
245 genera are currently accepted.

=== Synapomorphies ===
The relationships between the "core Malvales" families used to be defined on the basis of shared "malvean affinities". These included the presence of malvoid teeth, stems with mucilage canals, and stratified wedge-shaped phloem. These affinities were problematic because they were not always shared within the core families. Later studies revealed more unambiguous synapomorphies within Malvaceae s.l.. Synapomorphies identified within Malvaceae s.l. include the presence of tile cells, trichomatous nectaries, and an inflorescence structure called a bicolor unit. Tile cells consist of vertically positioned cells interspersed between and dimensionally similar to procumbent ray cells. Evidence of Malvean wood fossils has confirmed their evolutionary link in Malvaceae s.l., as well as explained their diverse structures. Flowers of Malvaceae s.l. exhibit nectaries consisting of densely arranged multicellular hairs resembling trichomes. In most of Malvaceae s.l., these trichomatous nectaries are located on the inner surface of the sepals, but flowers of the subfamily Tiliodeae also have present nectaries on the petals. Malvean flowers also share a unifying structure known as a bicolor unit, named for its initial discovery in the flowers of Theobroma bicolor. The bicolor unit consists of an ordered inflorescence with determinate cymose structures. The inflorescence can branch off the main axis, creating separate orders of the flowers, with the main axis developing first. Bracts on the peduncle subtend axillary buds that become these lateral stalks. One bract within this whorl is a sterile bract. The bicolor unit is a variable structure in complexity, but the presence of fertile and sterile bracts is a salient characteristic.

=== Names ===
The English common name mallow (also applied to other members of Malvaceae) comes from Latin malva (also the source for the English word mauve). Malva itself was ultimately derived from the word for the plant in ancient Mediterranean languages. Cognates of the word include Ancient Greek μαλάχη (malákhē) or μολόχη (molókhē), Modern Greek μολόχα (molókha), modern Arabic ملوخية (mulukhiyah) and modern Hebrew מלוחיה (molokhia).

== Description ==
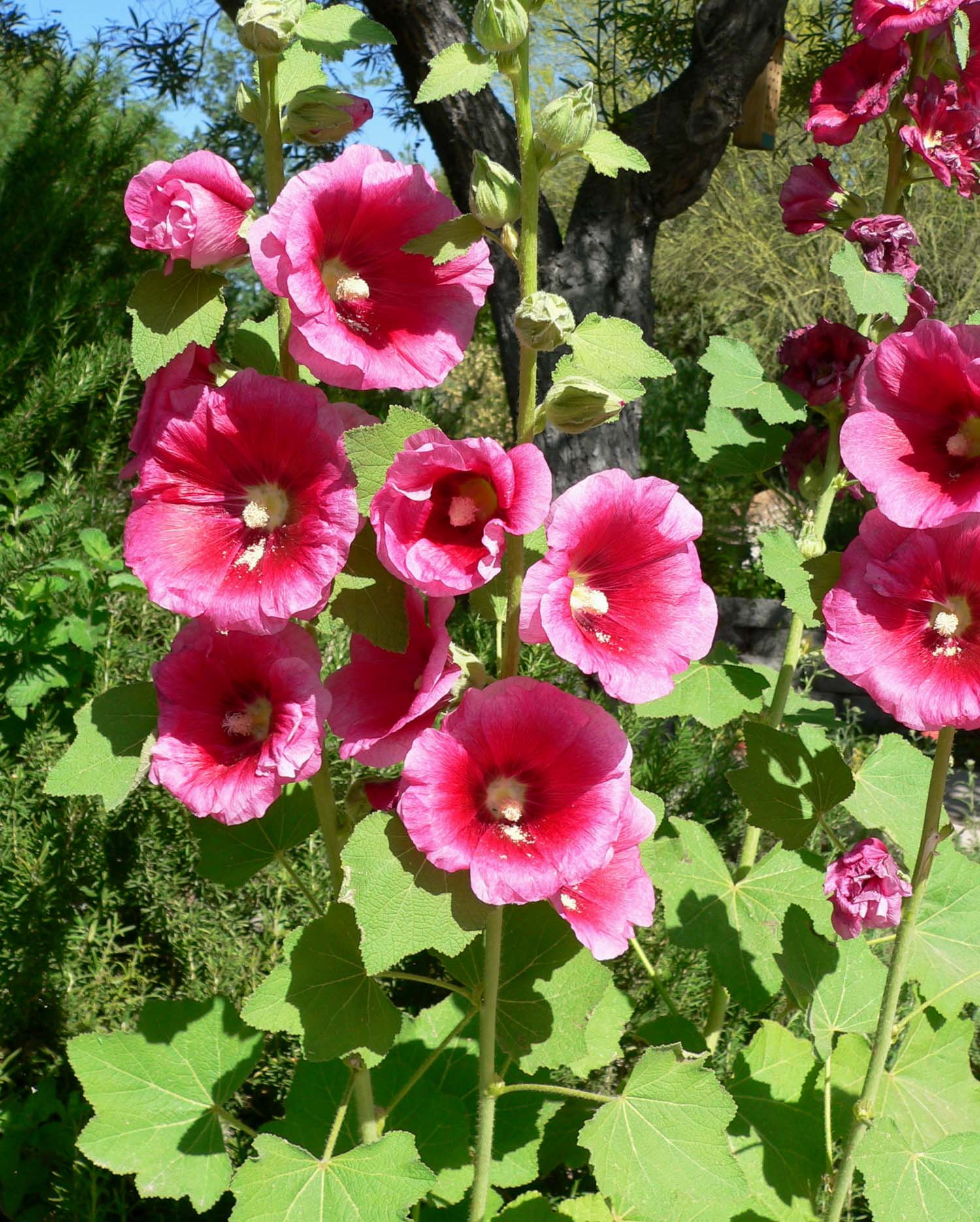
Alcea rosea, the hollyhock, is a common garden flower in Malvaceae

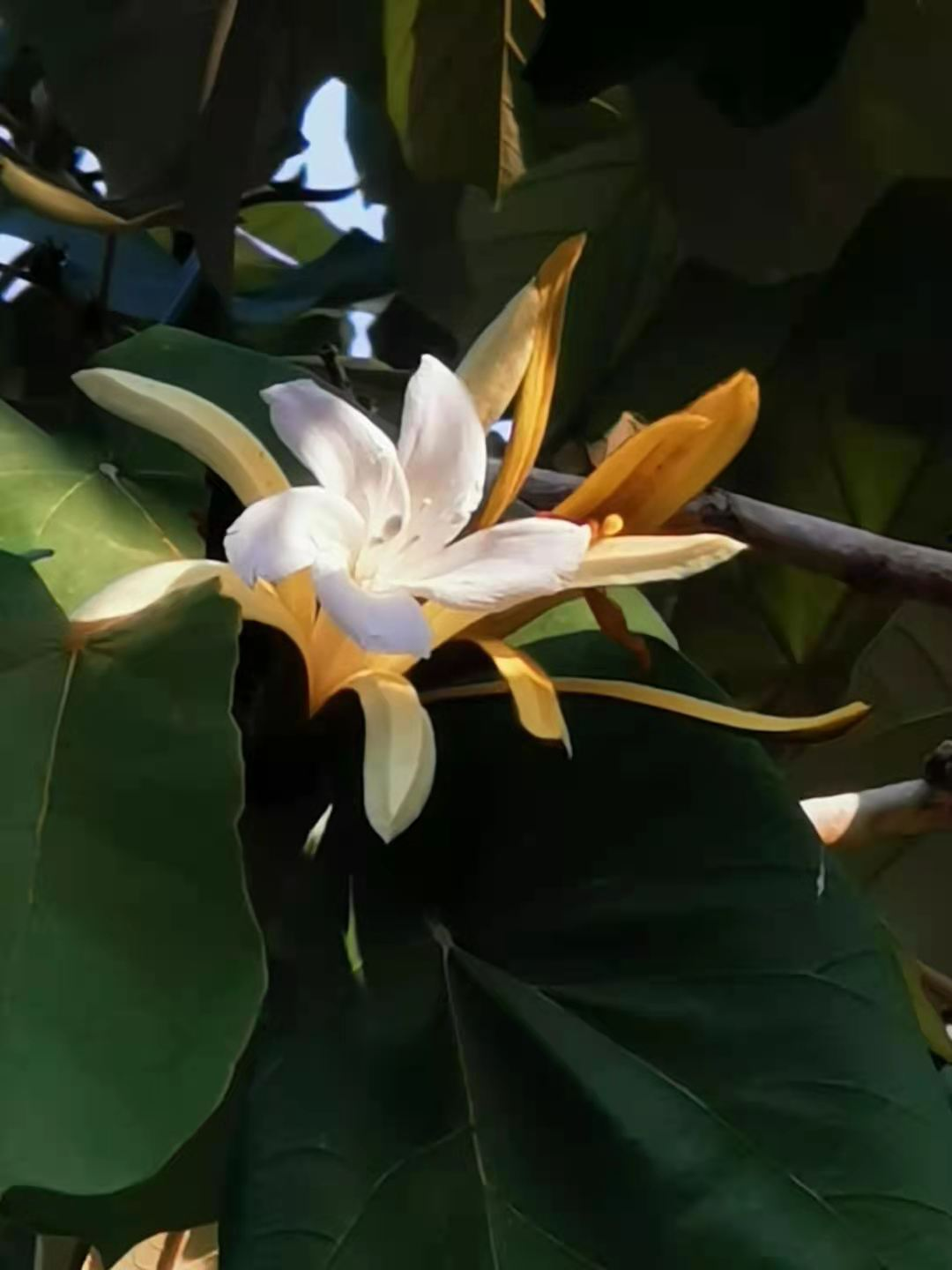
Pterospermum acerifolium

Most species are herbaceous plants or shrubs, but some are trees or lianas.

=== Leaves and stems ===
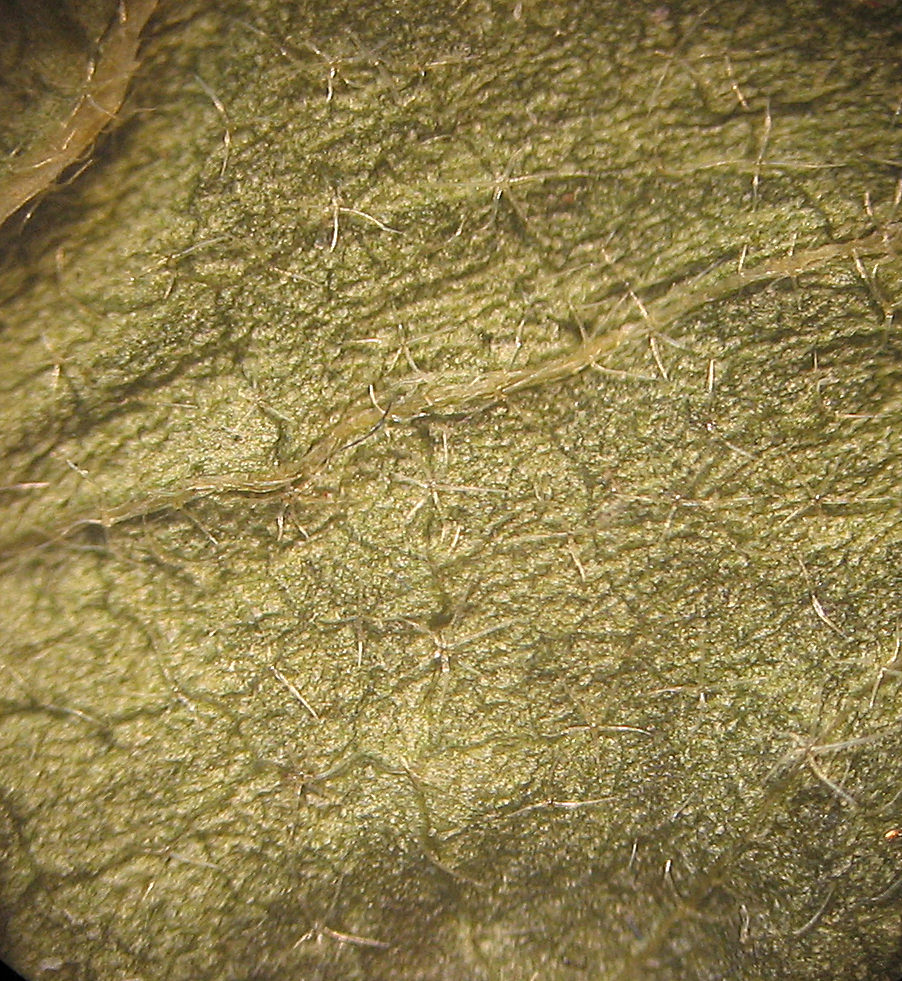
Stellate hairs on the underside of a dried leaf of Malva alcea

Leaves are generally alternate, often palmately lobed or compound and palmately veined. The margin may be entire, but when dentate, a vein ends at the tip of each tooth (malvoid teeth). Stipules are present. The stems contain mucous canals and often also mucous cavities. Hairs are common, and are most typically stellate. Stems of Bombacoideae are often covered in thick prickles.

=== Flowers ===
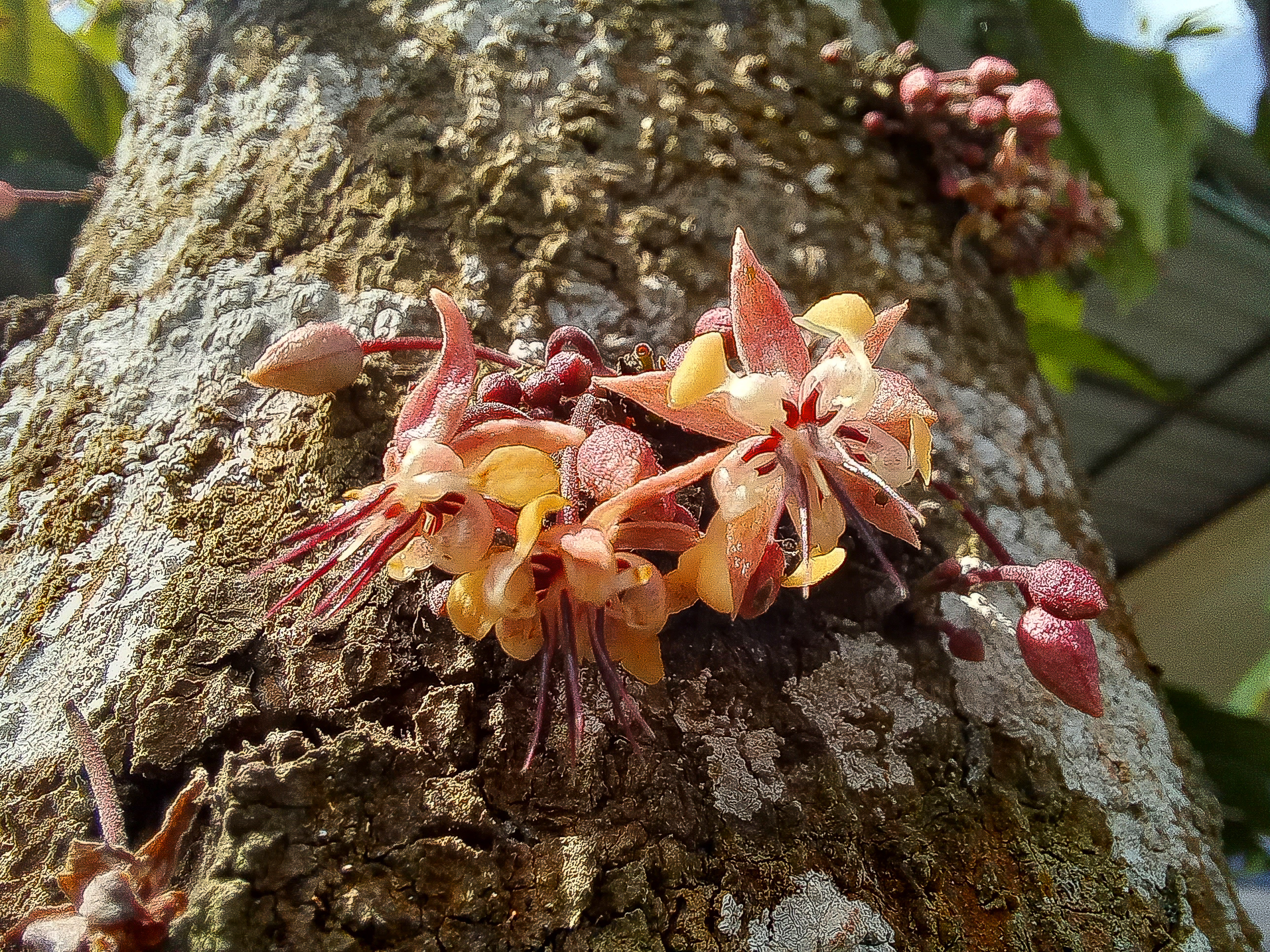
Close-up photograph of Theobroma cacao flowers.

The flowers are commonly borne in definite or indefinite axillary inflorescences, which are often reduced to a single flower, but may also be cauliflorous, oppositifolious, or terminal. They often bear supernumerary bracts in the structure of a bicolor unit. They can be unisexual or bisexual, and are generally actinomorphic, often associated with conspicuous bracts, forming an epicalyx. They generally have five valvate sepals, most frequently basally connate, with five imbricate petals. The stamens are five to numerous, and connate at least at their bases, but often forming a tube around the pistils. The pistils are composed of two to many connate carpels. The ovary is superior, with axial placentation, with capitate or lobed stigma. The flowers have nectaries made of many tightly packed glandular hairs, usually positioned on the sepals.

=== Fruits ===
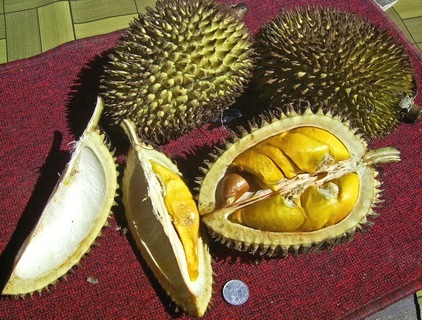
Durian fruits

The fruits are most often loculicidal capsules, schizocarps or nuts.

=== Pollination ===
Self-pollination is often avoided by means of protandry. Most species are entomophilous (pollinated by insects). Bees from the tribe Emphorini of the Apidae (including Ptilothrix, Diadasia, and Melitoma) are known to specialize on the plants.

== Importance ==
A number of species are pests in agriculture, including Abutilon theophrasti and Modiola caroliniana, and others that are garden escapees. Cotton (four species of Gossypium), kenaf (Hibiscus cannabinus), cacao (Theobroma cacao), kola nut (Cola spp.), and okra (Abelmoschus esculentus) are important agricultural crops. The fruit and leaves of baobabs are edible, as is the fruit of the durian. A number of species, including Hibiscus syriacus, Hibiscus rosa-sinensis and Alcea rosea are garden plants.

== See also ==
- Florissantia, an extinct Cenozoic genus in the subfamily Sterculioideae
