= List of Durio species =

Among the approximately thirty known species of Durio, so far eleven species have been identified to produce edible fruits. However, there are many species for which the fruit has never been collected or properly described and it is likely that other species with edible fruit exist. The currently known eleven species of edible durians are:

Image	Name	Common name	Distribution	Description
	Durio dulcis Becc.	durian marangang (or merangang), red durian, tutong, or lahong	Sabah and West Kalimantan, Borneo	
	Durio graveolens Becc.	Trako, tabelak, durian burung, durian kuning, durian merah, durian otak udang galah, red-fleshed durian	Southern Thailand, Peninsular Malaysia, Sumatra, Borneo, Palawan (Philippines)	It is a large tree up to 50 m (160 ft) tall. The husk of its fruit is orange-yellow, covered with pyramidal 1 cm (0.4 in) long spines. The fruit has sweet crimson-coloured flesh and a fragrance of roasted almonds. D. graveolens resembles D. dulcis but its fruit opens while it is still on the tree and has dark red flesh, whereas the fruit of D. dulcis drops unopened and has dark yellow flesh. Durian suluk, also known as durian siunggong, is a natural hybrid between D. zibethinus and D. graveolens, and retains the flavour and texture of D. zibethinus with subtle burnt caramel overtones of D. graveolens. Durian simpor is a mild-flavoured, yellow-fleshed variant of D. graveolens.
	Durio kinabaluensis Kosterm. & Soegeng	Mountain Durian	Crocker Range and Mount Kinabalu, Sabah	
	Durio kutejensis (Hassk.) Becc.	durian pulu, durian merah, nyekak, Pakan, Kuluk, or lai	Borneo	
	Durio lowianus Scort. ex King	durian duan, durian sepeh, durian au, Thurian-don	Peninsular Malaysia, Southern Thailand, and Sumatra	It is a large tree up to 50 metre tall, has red flowers and elongated. Its oval-shaped fruit contains yellow flesh.
	Durio macrantha Kosterm.		Mt. Leuser National Park, North Sumatra	
	Durio mansoni (Gamble) Bakh.	Tan duyin, Turimi	Thailand and Myanmar	
	Durio oxleyanus Griff.	durian sukang, durian beludu, isu or kerontangan	Peninsular Malaysia, Sumatra, and Borneo	It is a fairly large tree up to 40 m (130 ft) tall. It produces small, round, greyish-green fruits with large, stiff, broadly pyramidal, slightly curved spines. The flesh is yellow, smooth-textured and sweet.
	Durio testudinarius Becc.	tortoise or kura-kura durian	Borneo	It is a medium-sized tree up to 25 m (82 ft) tall. Being a self-pollinated species, it is less variable, and has an extended flowering season. The flesh of its fruit is pale yellow and has a stronger aroma than other species of Durio.
	Durio wyatt-smithii Kosterm.		Peninsular Malaysia (Trengganu)	
	Durio zibethinus L.		Borneo and Sumatra	

The other species, which haven't been identified to produce edible fruits are:

Image	Name	Common name	Distribution	Description
	Durio acutifolius (Mast.) Kosterm.	Tupaloh, durian burung, Durian anggang, Tuwola pupulu, durian lojang, Lai Kuju	Kalimantan and Sabah	
	Durio affinis Becc.	duan tajam	West Kalimantan and Sabah.	
	Durio beccarianus Kosterm. & Soegeng		Indonesian West Borneo, Upper Kapuas River	
	Durio bukitrayaensis Kosterm.		Borneo	
	Durio burmanicus Soegeng		Myanmar	
	Durio carinatus Mast.		Sumatra, Pahang, Johor, Sabah, Sarawak and Brunei	
	Durio ceylanicus Gardner	Ceylon durian	Sri Lanka	
	Durio crassipes Kosterm. & Soegeng		Tenom and Sipitang areas of Sabah.	
	Durio excelsus (Korth.) Bakh.	Apun; Durian daun; Begurah	Kalimantan	
	Durio gerikensis M.N.Faizal, Edward, Latiff & Hadrul		Peninsular Malaysia.	
	Durio griffithii (Mast.) Bakh.	Simartarutung	Peninsular Malaysia, Sumatra, Borneo.	
	Durio lanceolatus (Mast.)	Bian, Dian perai, Durian, Durian anggang, Durian bengan, Durian burong,	Borneo	
	Durio lissocarpus Mast.:	Durian burung	Borneo	
	Durio macrolepis Kosterm.		Peninsular Malaysia.	
	Durio macrophyllus (King) Ridl.	tong, daun, batan, daun besar, pumkubm (Batak)	Peninsular Malaysia	
	Durio malaccensis Planch. ex Mast.	batang, tong Durian batang, durian bangko, durian bankolo	Peninsular Malaysia, Sumatra.	It is normally white-flowered, but some D. malaccensis with reddish flowers have been discovered in Johor State, perhaps from cross-pollination by the pink or red-flowered D. lowianus and D. pinangianus.
	Durio oblongus Mast.		Sarawak.	
	Durio pinangianus (Becc.) Ridl.	daun tajam, burung	Peninsular Malaysia (Perak, Penang).	
	Durio purpureus Kosterm. & Soegeng		West Kalimantan	
	Durio singaporensis Ridl.	durian daun, bujur	Peninsular Malaysia.	

== See also ==
- List of durian diseases and pests
