= Red durian =

Red durian (Malay: Durian merah) may refer to several different species of durian:

- Durio dulcis
- Durio graveolens
- Durio kutejensis
