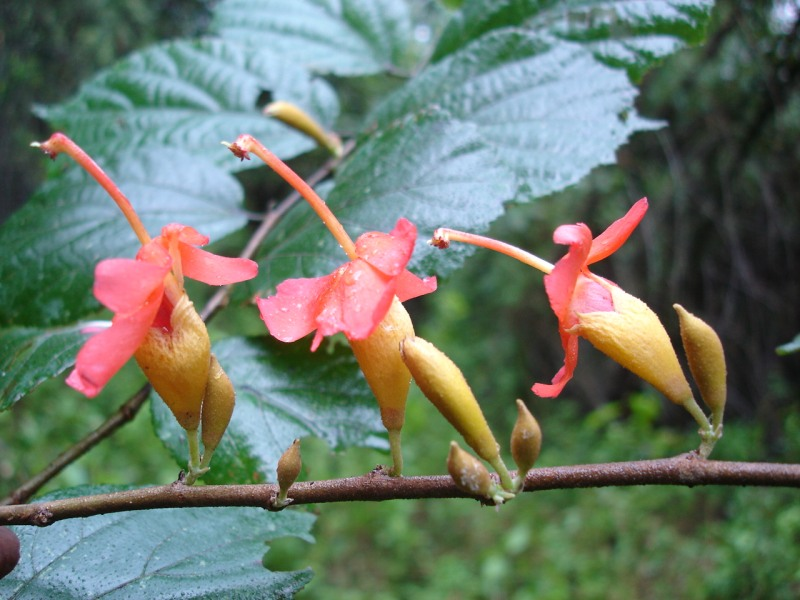
- Helicteres isora

Scientific classification
- Kingdom: Plantae
- Clade: Tracheophytes
- Clade: Angiosperms
- Clade: Eudicots
- Clade: Rosids
- Order: Malvales
- Family: Malvaceae
- Subfamily: Helicteroideae; Meisn.

= Helicteroideae =

Subfamily of plants

Helicteroideae is a subfamily of the family Malvaceae. Some taxonomists have place genera in Helicteroideae in distinct families Durionaceae and Helicteraceae.

== Tribes and genera ==
Most modern treatments recognise two tribes:

Durioneae

1. Boschia Korth.
2. Coelostegia Benth.
3. Cullenia Wight
4. Durio Adans.
5. Kostermansia Soegeng
6. Neesia Blume

=== Helictereae ===
1. Helicteres Pluk. ex L.
2. Mansonia J.R.Drumm.
3. Neoregnellia Urb.
4. Reevesia Lindl.
5. Triplochiton K.Schum.
6. Ungeria Schott & Endl.
