= Nyekak =

Nyekak can refer to two types of durians:

- Durio kutejensis, which uses it as a common name
- The DQ2 nyekak (DK8) variety of Durio graveolens
