= Fusarium gibbosum =

Scientific classification
- Domain: Eukaryota
- Kingdom: Fungi
- Division: Ascomycota
- Class: Sordariomycetes
- Order: Hypocreales
- Family: Nectriaceae
- Genus: Fusarium
- Species: F. gibbosum

Binomial name
- Fusarium gibbosum Appel & Wollenw.

Synonyms
- Fusarium bullatum Sherb., Mem. Cornell Univ. Agric. Exp. Stn 6: 198 (1915); Fusarium equiseti var. bullatum (Sherb.) Wollenw., Fusaria autographica delineata 3: no. 916 (1930); Fusarium equiseti var. intermedium Saccas, Agronomía trop. 10: 49 (1955); Fusarium falcatum Appel & Wollenw., Arbeiten Kaiserl. Biol. Anst. Ld.- u. Forstw. 8: 184 (1910); Fusarium falcatum var. fuscum Sherb., Mem. Cornell Univ. Agric. Exp. Stn 6: 138 (1915); Fusarium gibbosum var. bullatum (Sherb.) Bilaĭ, Mikrobiol. Zh. 49(6): 6 (1987); Fusarium roseum var. gibbosum (Appel & Wollenw.) Messiaen & R. Cass., Ann. Inst. Rech. Agron., Ser. C. (Ann. Epiphyt.) 19: 435 (1968); Fusarium roseum var. gibbosum (Appel & Wollenw.) Messiaen & R. Cass., in Tivoli, Agronomie 8(3): 220 (1988); Fusarium vasinfectum var. pisi Schikora, Arb. K. biol. Anst. f. Land-u-Forstwirt. 5: 157-188 (1906); Gibberella intricans Wollenw., Fusaria autographica delineata 3: no. 810 (1930)

Species of fungus

Fusarium gibbosum (syn. Gibberella intricans) is a fungal plant pathogen.

It is an opportunistic pathogen of durians such as Durio graveolens and Durio kutejensis.
