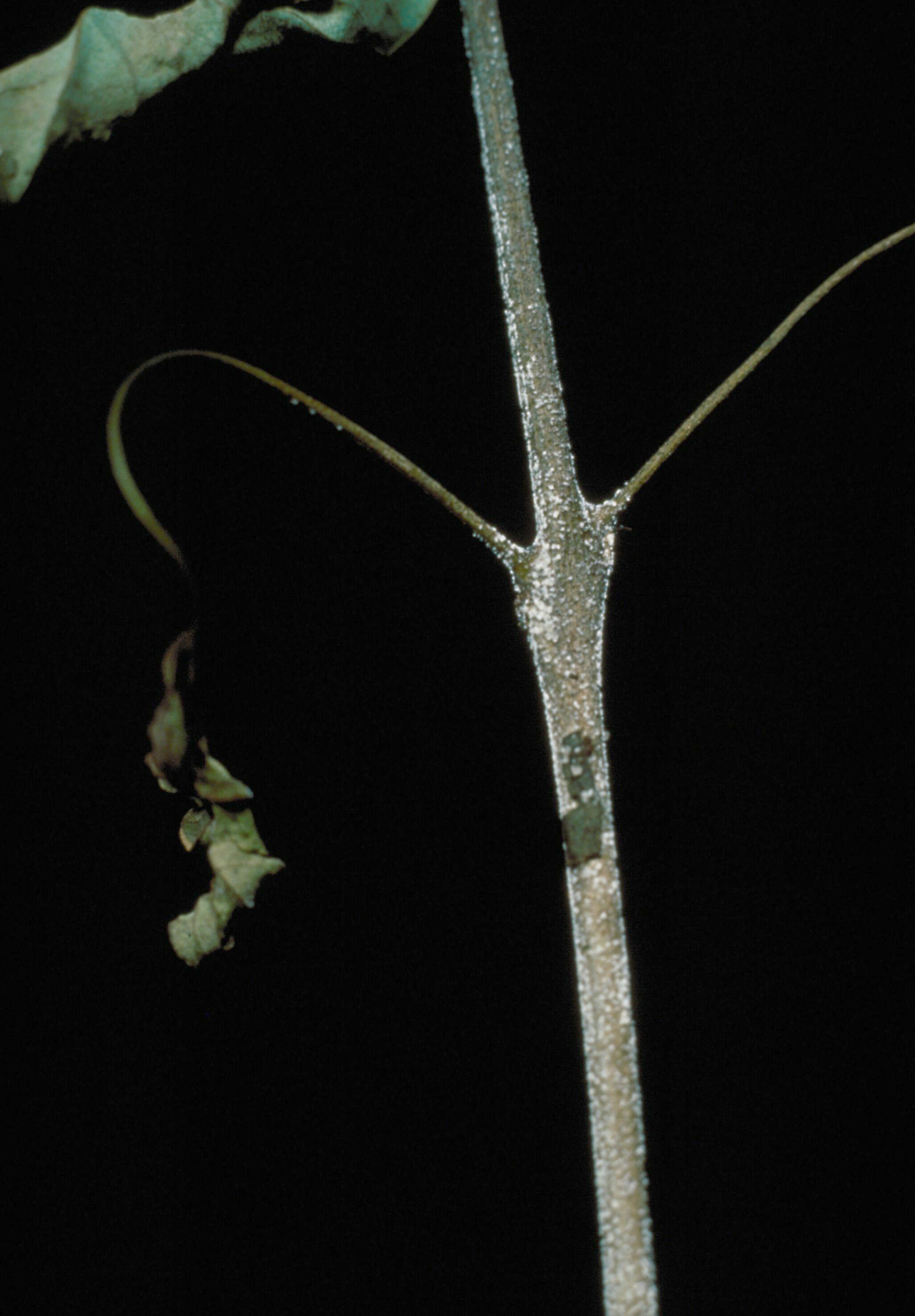

Scientific classification
- Domain: Eukaryota
- Kingdom: Fungi
- Division: Ascomycota
- Class: Sordariomycetes
- Order: Hypocreales
- Family: Nectriaceae
- Genus: Calonectria
- Species: C. kyotensis

Binomial name
- Calonectria kyotensis Terash., (1968)

Synonyms
- Calonectria floridana Sobers, (1969); Calonectria morganii Crous, Alfenas, & M.J.Wingf., (1993); Calonectria uniseptata Gerlach, (1968); Cylindrocladium floridanum Sobers & C.P.Seym., (1967) (anamorph); Cylindrocladium pithecolobii Petch, (1917); Cylindrocladium scoparium Morgan, (1892); Diplocladium cylindrosporium Ellis & Everh., (1900)

= Calonectria kyotensis =

Species of fungus

Calonectria kyotensis is a fungal plant pathogen. It is known to affect harvested durians, including from Durio graveolens and D. kutejensis.
