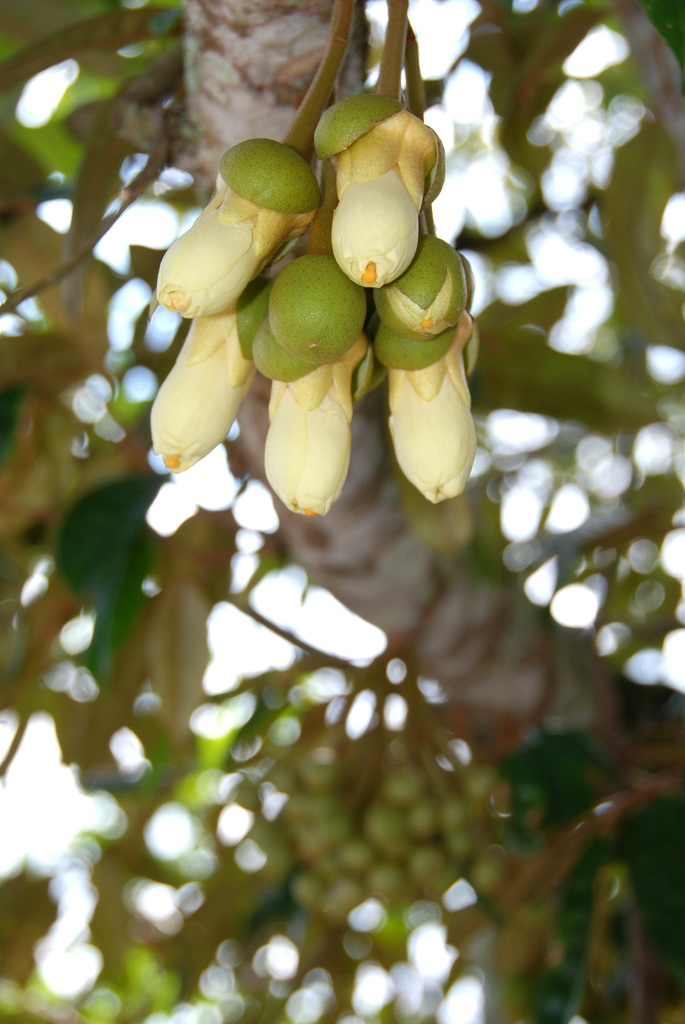
- Durian flower

Scientific classification
- Kingdom: Plantae
- Clade: Tracheophytes
- Clade: Angiosperms
- Clade: Eudicots
- Clade: Rosids
- Order: Malvales
- Family: Malvaceae
- Subfamily: Helicteroideae
- Tribe: Durioneae; Becc.

Genera
- Boschia; Coelostegia; Cullenia; Durio; Kostermansia; Neesia

= Durioneae =

Tribe of flowering plants

Durioneae is a tribe within the subfamily Helicteroideae of the plant family Malvaceae s.l. The tribe contains at least five genera, including Durio, the genus of tree species that produce durian fruits.

== Taxonomy ==
Within Durioneae, Kostermansia and Coelostegia form a clade that is sister to the clade comprising Durio s.s. and Boschia, which are some consider to comprise a single genus, and Cullenia. Both of these clades form a clade that is sister to the remaining genus of the tribe, Neesia. Camptostemon and Papuodendron are often included in this tribe as well. However, certain characters (pollen morphology, androecial vasculature, and wood anatomy, for example) support a closer relationship to the Malvoideae than to the Helicteroideae for these two genera.

Durioneae has traditionally been placed within the Bombacaceae because of the combination of monothecate anthers, smooth pollen, and tree habit. However, recent molecular evidence indicates that this tribe is most closely related to the tribe Helictereae of the traditional Sterculiaceae. In certain recent circumscriptions of the mallow family, the Bombacaceae and Sterculiaceae form an expanded family Malvaceae that also includes traditional Malvaceae and Tiliaceae. In this circumscription of Malvaceae, the family is divided into 9 subfamilies and Durioneae is placed into the subfamily Helicteroideae, along with some of the members of the traditional Helictereae.
