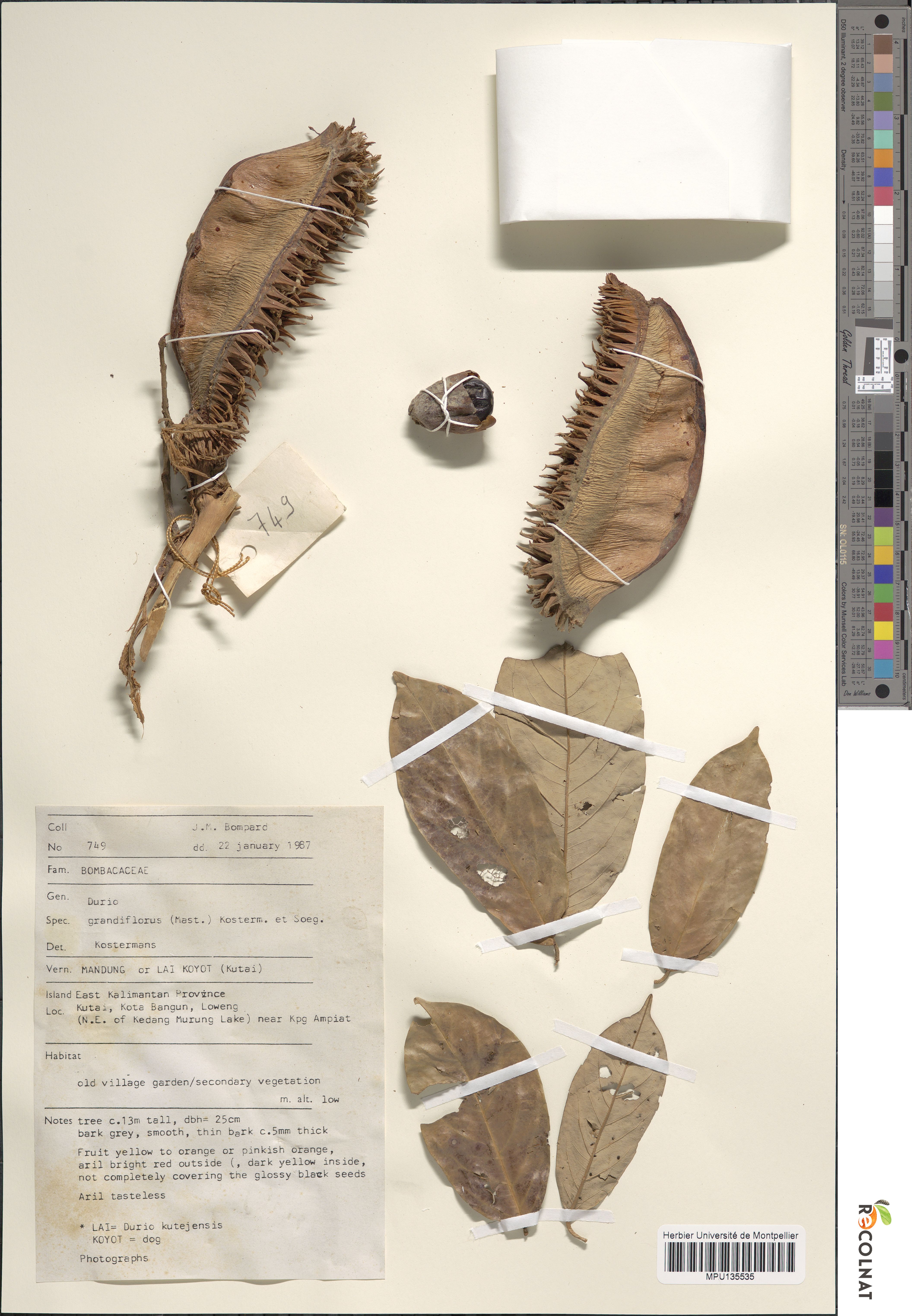
- Herbarium specimen, 1987

Conservation status
- Least Concern (IUCN 3.1)

Scientific classification
- Kingdom: Plantae
- Clade: Embryophytes
- Clade: Tracheophytes
- Clade: Angiosperms
- Clade: Eudicots
- Clade: Rosids
- Order: Malvales
- Family: Malvaceae
- Genus: Boschia
- Species: B. grandiflora

Binomial name
- Boschia grandiflora Mast.

Synonyms
- Durio grandiflorus (Mast.) Kosterm. & Soegeng

= Boschia grandiflora =

Species of flowering plant

Boschia grandiflora, the ghost durian or durian munjit, is a species of tree in the family Malvaceae. It is endemic to the island of Borneo.

== Description ==
Boschia grandiflora is a medium-sized tree up to 30 m (100 ft) tall, with a trunk diameter up to 50 cm (20 in). The tree has buttresses. The ellipsoid fruit measures up to 20 cm (8 in) by 15 cm (6 in) and features spines up to 2 cm (0.8 in) long. Their coloration can range from greenish-brown to bluish-grey. The brown seeds measure up to 3 cm (1.2 in) long, and are covered by an edible aril.

== Uses ==
Boschia grandiflora is an edible species, formerly in the genus Durio, which produces the popular fruit known as durian. The fruit of this species has yellow flesh. The seeds have a red, edible aril. The wood is used in construction and for furniture.
