= Durian pipit =

Durian pipit can refer to:

- Durio graveolens, which has a regional name of 'durian pipit'
- Durian Pipit, a mukim (administrative division) of Hulu Perak District, Malaysia
