= Trans Eastern Kedah Interland Highway =

Toll-free highway in Kedah, Malaysia

Route information
- Length: 74.5 km (46.3 mi)

Major junctions
- North end: Durian Burung
- South end: Kupang

Location
- Country: Malaysia

Highway system
- Highways in Malaysia; Expressways; Federal; State

The Trans Eastern Kedah Interland Highway (TEKIH) is a new toll-free highway in the state of Kedah, Malaysia.

At most sections, the highest was built under the JKR R5 road standard, allowing maximum speed limit of up to 90 km/h.

== List of junctions ==
| Km | Exit | Junctions | To | Remarks |
|---|---|---|---|---|
| | | | North ประเทศไทย, Thailand (Thai language); Ban Prakop Checkpoint; 4113 (Thai language) Ban Prakop Road (Thai language); Ban Prakop | |
ประเทศไทย; Thailand จังหวัดสงขลา; Songkhla Province (Thai language); Prakop District
ASEAN Malaysia–Thailand Border
Malaysia; Kedah Darul Aman; Padang Terap district border
| -- | | | | |
Durian Burung Checkpoint; Customs
| | | Durian Burung Checkpoint | Custom Complex | |
| | | Durian Burung | | |
Trans Eastern Kedah Interland Highway; Start/End of highway
| | | Pedu | | |
| | | Sungai Chapar | | |
| | | Sungai Sok | | |
| | | Weng | | |
Trans Eastern Kedah Interland Highway; Start/End of highway
| | | Kupang | West; FT 67 Sungai Petani; FT 67 Merbau Pulas; FT 67 Kuala Ketil; Butterworth–Kulim Expressway Butterworth–Kulim Expressway; Butterworth; Kulim East; FT 67 Baling; FT 67 Pengkalan Hulu; FT 67 Gerik | T-junctions |
