= Reevesia rotundifolia =

Conservation status
- Critically Endangered (IUCN 2.3)

Scientific classification
- Kingdom: Plantae
- Clade: Tracheophytes
- Clade: Angiosperms
- Clade: Eudicots
- Clade: Rosids
- Order: Malvales
- Family: Malvaceae
- Genus: Reevesia
- Species: R. rotundifolia

Binomial name
- Reevesia rotundifolia Chun

Species of flowering plant

Reevesia rotundifolia is a species of flowering plant in the family Malvaceae. It is a tree endemic to southern Guangxi and Guangdong in southeastern China. It is threatened by habitat loss.
