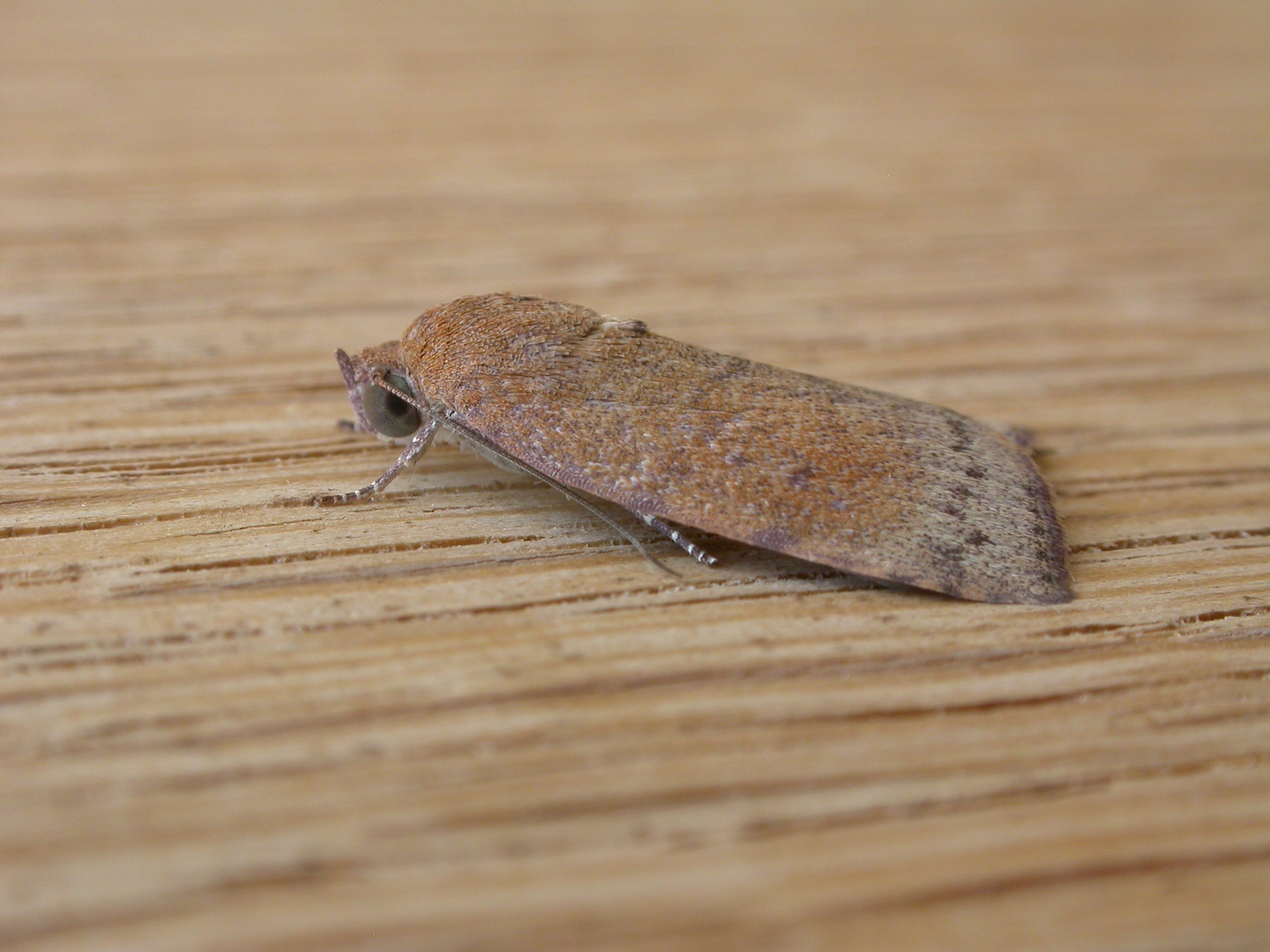

Scientific classification
- Kingdom: Animalia
- Phylum: Arthropoda
- Clade: Pancrustacea
- Class: Insecta
- Order: Lepidoptera
- Superfamily: Noctuoidea
- Family: Nolidae
- Genus: Austrocarea
- Species: A. iocephala

Binomial name
- Austrocarea iocephala (Turner, 1902)

Synonyms
- Maurilia iocephala Turner, 1902; Austrocarea millsi Holloway, 1977

= Austrocarea iocephala =

Species of moth

Austrocarea iocephala is a moth of the family Nolidae. It is found in New South Wales and Norfolk Island.

The moths can be found on the tree Ungeria floribunda on Norfolk Island.
