= Reevesia =

- Reevesia formosana

Scientific classification
- Kingdom: Plantae
- Clade: Tracheophytes
- Clade: Angiosperms
- Clade: Eudicots
- Clade: Rosids
- Order: Malvales
- Family: Malvaceae
- Subfamily: Helicteroideae
- Tribe: Helictereae
- Genus: Reevesia; Lindl.

Synonyms
- Veeresia Monach. & Moldenke

Genus of flowering plants

Reevesia is a genus of flowering plant in the family Malvaceae. It includes 25 species with a disjunction distribution in Asia (eastern Himalayas, Indochina, and southern China) northeastern Mexico, and Nicaragua.

== Species ==
14 species are accepted.

- Reevesia clarkii (Monach. & Moldenke) Machuca-Machuca
- Reevesia gagnepainiana Tardieu
- Reevesia glaucophylla H.H.Hsue
- Reevesia lofouensis Chun & H.H.Hsue
- Reevesia lumlingensis H.H.Hsue ex S.J.Xu
- Reevesia napoensis H.Z.Feng & Y.Feng Huang
- Reevesia orbicularifolia H.H.Hsue
- Reevesia pubescens Mast.
- Reevesia rotundifolia Chun
- Reevesia rubronervia H.H.Hsue
- Reevesia thyrsoidea Lindl.
- Reevesia tomentosa H.L.Li
- Reevesia wallichii R.Br. ex Mast.
- Reevesia yersinii A.Chev. ex Tardieu
