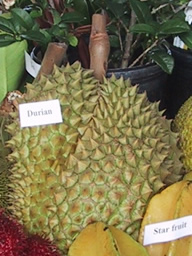
- Durio zibethinus (fruit)

Scientific classification
- Kingdom: Plantae
- Clade: Tracheophytes
- Clade: Angiosperms
- Clade: Eudicots
- Clade: Rosids
- Order: Malvales
- Family: Malvaceae
- Subfamily: Helicteroideae
- Tribe: Durioneae
- Genus: Durio; L.

Type species
- Durio zibethinus L.

Species
- 29; also see the list of Durio species

Synonyms
- Lahia Hassk

= Durio =

Genus of plants

Durio is a genus of about 30 species of small to large trees in the mallow family Malvaceae. 11 species produce edible fruit, known as durian, that also have a plethora local and regional names. Durio zibethinus is the most widely-cultivated and commercialized species.

== Description ==
Durio are native to the tropics of Asia; from Sri Lanka, India and Myanmar in the north, through Thailand, Peninsular Malaysia, Borneo, Sumatra and the Philippines, and east to Papua New Guinea. Borneo is the centre of diversity with 15 endemic species. All Durio are small to large trees, with larger trees usually buttressed. The tips of twigs are covered in lepidote scales. Leaves are simple, elliptic to lanceolate, entire, alternately arranged, with a lower surface covered with a layer of stellate (star-shaped) hairs and in most cases topped with a further layer of fimbriate (fringed) scales.

Often considered the king of fruits, durian is distinguished by its large size, arresting odor, and fearsome thorny husk. The fruit can grow up to 30 centimeters long and 15 centimeters in diameter, and typically weighs one to three kilograms. Its shape ranges from oblong to round, the colour of its husk from green to brown, and its flesh from pale yellow to red, depending on the species.

The edible flesh emits a distinctive odour that is strong and penetrating, even when the husk is intact. The smell, depending on the person, evokes rotting onions, turpentine, or even sewage, yet to others it is welcoming and appetizing. The persistence of the smell has led to its ban in some hotels and public transport in Southeast Asia.

== Taxonomy ==
Early works describe Durio sensu lato, which had 30 recognised species, with Durio sensu stricto comprising 24 of them. The 6 additional species included in Durio s.l. are now considered by some to comprise their own genus, Boschia. Durio s.s. and Boschia have indistinguishable vegetative characteristics and many shared floral characteristics. The crucial difference between the two is that anther locules open by apical pores in Boschia and by longitudinal slits in Durio s.s. These two genera form a clade that is sister to another genus, Cullenia. These three genera together form a clade that is characterised by highly modified (mono- and polythecate, as opposed to bithecate) anthers. The genus Durio had been placed in the family Bombacaceae, and by other authorities in a smaller family of just seven genera, Durionaceae; this is now recognised as the tribe Durioneae.

Durio was included in Bombacaceae because of the presence of monothecate anthers, as opposed to the bithecate anthers common to the rest of the mallows (and angiosperms, in general). However, the first studies to examine mallow phylogeny using molecular data found that the tribe Durioneae should be placed in the subfamily Helicteroideae of an expanded Malvaceae. The authors of these studies hypothesise that monothecate anthers have most likely evolved convergently in Durioneae and in the Malvatheca clade (comprising Malvaceae s.l. subfamilies Malvoideae and Bombacoideae).

=== Species ===
Plants of the World Online currently (2025) accepts 29 species.

1. Durio affinis Becc.
2. Durio beccarianus Kosterm. & Soegeng.
3. Durio bruneiensis Kosterm.
4. Durio bukitrayaensis Kosterm.
5. Durio burmanicus Soegeng.
6. Durio carinatus Mast.
7. Durio connatus Priyanti
8. Durio crassipes Kosterm.
9. Durio dulcis Becc.
10. Durio gerikensis M.N.Faizal, Besi, Latiff & Hadrul
11. Durio graveolens Becc.
12. Durio kinabaluensis Kosterm & Soegeng
13. Durio kutejensis Hassk. & Becc.
14. Durio lanceolatus Mast.
15. Durio lissocarpus Mast.
16. Durio lowianus Scort. & King
17. Durio macrantha Kosterm.
18. Durio macrolepis Kosterm.
19. Durio macrophyllus Ridl.
20. Durio malaccensis Planch.
21. Durio oblongus Mast.
22. Durio oxleyanus Griff.
23. Durio perakensis Salma
24. Durio pinangianus Ridl.
25. Durio purpureus Kosterm. & Soegeng.
26. Durio singaporensis Ridl.
27. Durio testudinarius Becc.
28. Durio wyatt-smithii Kosterm.
29. Durio zibethinus L.

=== Formerly classified ===
1. Boschia griffithii Mast. (as D. acutifolius (Mast.) Kosterm. and D. griffithii (Mast.) Bakh.)
