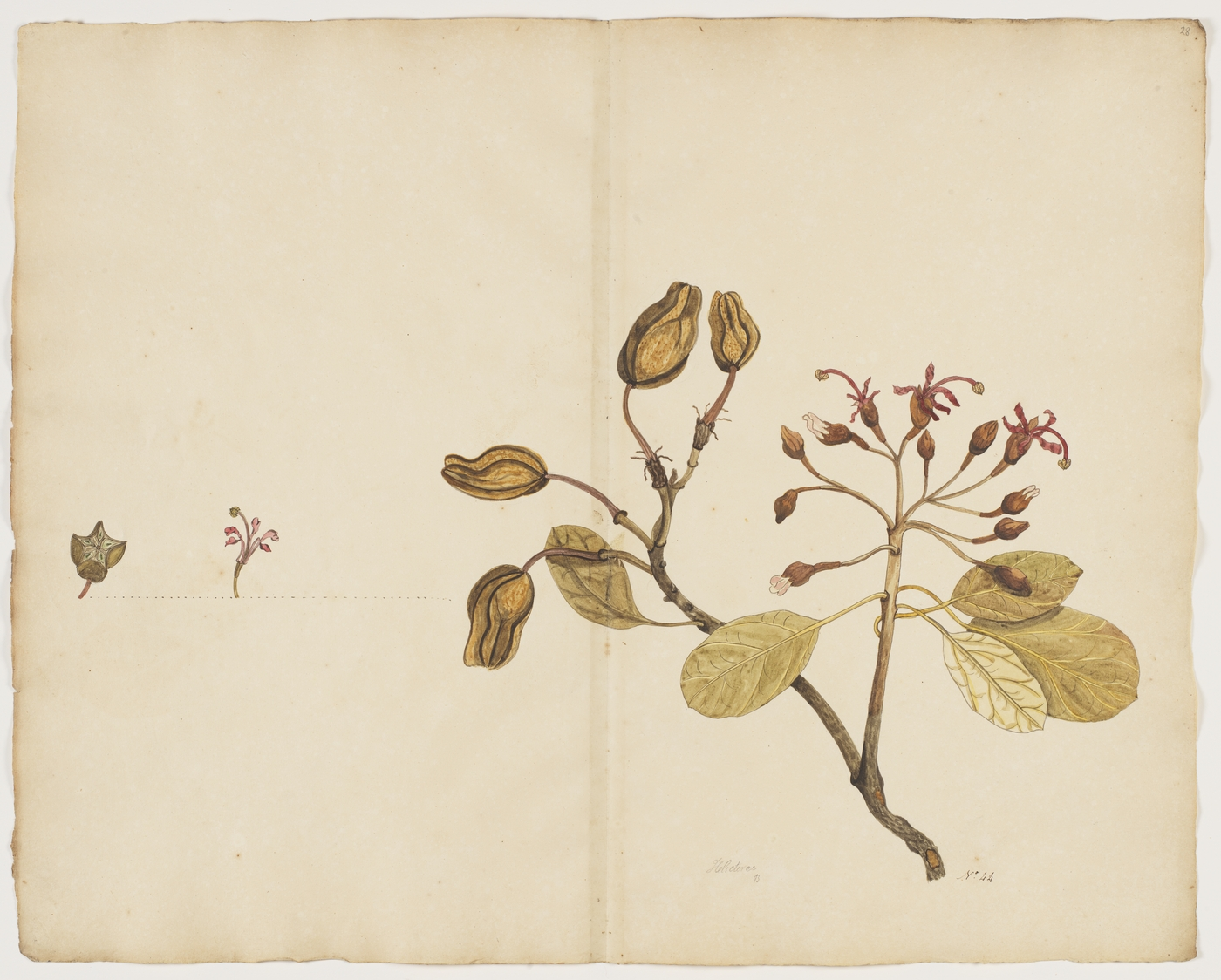
- Watercolour illustration by John Doody of Ungeria floribunda

Scientific classification
- Kingdom: Plantae
- Clade: Tracheophytes
- Clade: Angiosperms
- Clade: Eudicots
- Clade: Rosids
- Order: Malvales
- Family: Malvaceae
- Tribe: Helictereae
- Genus: Ungeria; Schott & Endl.
- Species: U. floribunda

Binomial name
- Ungeria floribunda Schott & Endl.

= Ungeria =

Species of flowering plant

Ungeria is a monotypic genus of flowering plants belonging to the family Malvaceae. It just contains one species, Ungeria floribunda Schott & Endl. It is also in the Helicteroideae subfamily and Helictereae tribe.

Its native range is Norfolk Island (in the Pacific Ocean near Australia). It is found in Mount Pitt Nature Reserve (part of Norfolk Island National Park).

== Description ==
It is a tree that can grow up to 15 m (49 ft) tall. It has leaves which are broadly elliptic or obovate and evergreen. The leaf blades are about 6–12 cm (2–5 in) long and 4–8 cm (2–3 in) wide. It has deep pink flowers. The flowers each have five deep pink petals 16–20 mm (1–1 in) long and it thought to be pollinated by birds. The fruits are 5 lobed and star-shaped in cross-section.

Moths of Austrocarea iocephala subspecies millsi can be found on the tree.

It is related (dna wise) to the Durian.

== Taxonomy ==
It has the common name of 'Bastard Oak', (due to the inferior quality of the timber,) was listed as Vulnerable in 2003 on Norfolk Island. 502 plants were counted in 2003.

The genus name of Ungeria is in honour of Franz Unger (1800–1870), an Austrian botanist, paleontologist and plant physiologist. The Latin specific epithet of floribunda means "many-flowering", (such as Floribunda). Both the genus and sole species were first described and published in Meletemata Botanica (Melet. Bot.) on page 27 in 1832. The genus is recognized by the United States Department of Agriculture and the Agricultural Research Service, but they do not list any known species.

== Culture ==
On 14 January 2020, an image of Ungeria floribunda was used on a postage stamp for Australia, one of two 'Norfolk Island Early Botanical Art' stamps.
