= Durio testudinarius =

Conservation status
- Least Concern (IUCN 3.1)

Scientific classification
- Kingdom: Plantae
- Clade: Tracheophytes
- Clade: Angiosperms
- Clade: Eudicots
- Clade: Rosids
- Order: Malvales
- Family: Malvaceae
- Genus: Durio
- Species: D. testudinarius

Binomial name
- Durio testudinarius Becc.

Species of tree

Durio testudinarius, commonly known as durian kura kura (literally: 'tortoise durian') is a species of durian tree in the family Malvaceae. It is endemic to Borneo.

Durio testudinarius grows in lowland rain forest, including valley and hill forests up to 600 meters elevation. It is typically an understory tree. It is characterized by cauliflory – flowers and fruit borne on the trunk of the tree.

== See also ==
- List of Durio species, with a paragraph on D. testudinarius.
