= Durio pinangianus =

Conservation status
- Vulnerable (IUCN 3.1)

Scientific classification
- Kingdom: Plantae
- Clade: Tracheophytes
- Clade: Angiosperms
- Clade: Eudicots
- Clade: Rosids
- Order: Malvales
- Family: Malvaceae
- Genus: Durio
- Species: D. pinangianus

Binomial name
- Durio pinangianus (Becc.) Ridl.

Synonyms
- Durio testudinarius var. pinangianus Becc.

Species of tree

Durio pinangianus is a species of tree in the family Malvaceae. It is endemic to Peninsular Malaysia. It is a large tree which grows up to 18 metres tall with a bole up to 51 cm in diameter. It grows in lowland and submontane rain forest in lowland forests and on steep slopes up to 1,120 metres elevation.

== See also ==
- List of Durio species, with a few notes on this species
