= Durio lowianus =

Conservation status
- Vulnerable (IUCN 3.1)

Scientific classification
- Kingdom: Plantae
- Clade: Tracheophytes
- Clade: Angiosperms
- Clade: Eudicots
- Clade: Rosids
- Order: Malvales
- Family: Malvaceae
- Genus: Durio
- Species: D. lowianus

Binomial name
- Durio lowianus Scort. ex King

Synonyms
- Durio spontaneus Bakh. ex Steenis; Durio wrayi King

Species of tree

Durio lowianus is a species of tree in the family Malvaceae. It is native to Thailand, Peninsular Malaysia, and Sumatra, Indonesia. Fruits have an edible aril that is highly variable in thickness, texture and taste. The flavor profile is sweet, creamy, fruity, floral and occasionally pungently alcoholic. Most fruits are harvested from remnant trees that are spared during land clearance for plantations, or from primary or secondary forests; there is little intentional planting of the species save for genebanks. The cultivar 'L13', registered with the Malaysia Agricultural Research and Development Institute (MARDI) as D225, has been grafted and propagated by Haw Kee Durian Orchard in Negeri Sembilan, Malaysia.

Vernacular names include: durian daun (also a local name for another species of durian, Durio oxleyanus, "daun" meaning "leaf" in Malay, referring to the generally lighter green color of their fruits in comparison to those of Durio zibethinus), durian melaka, durian sangka, durian sempa, durian sepeh (Terengganu), durian au (Kelantan), and durian bunga merah (Negeri Sembilan, Pahang and Selangor, "bunga merah" meaning "red flower" in Malay, referring to pink-to-red petals and filaments compared to those of Durio zibethinus)
