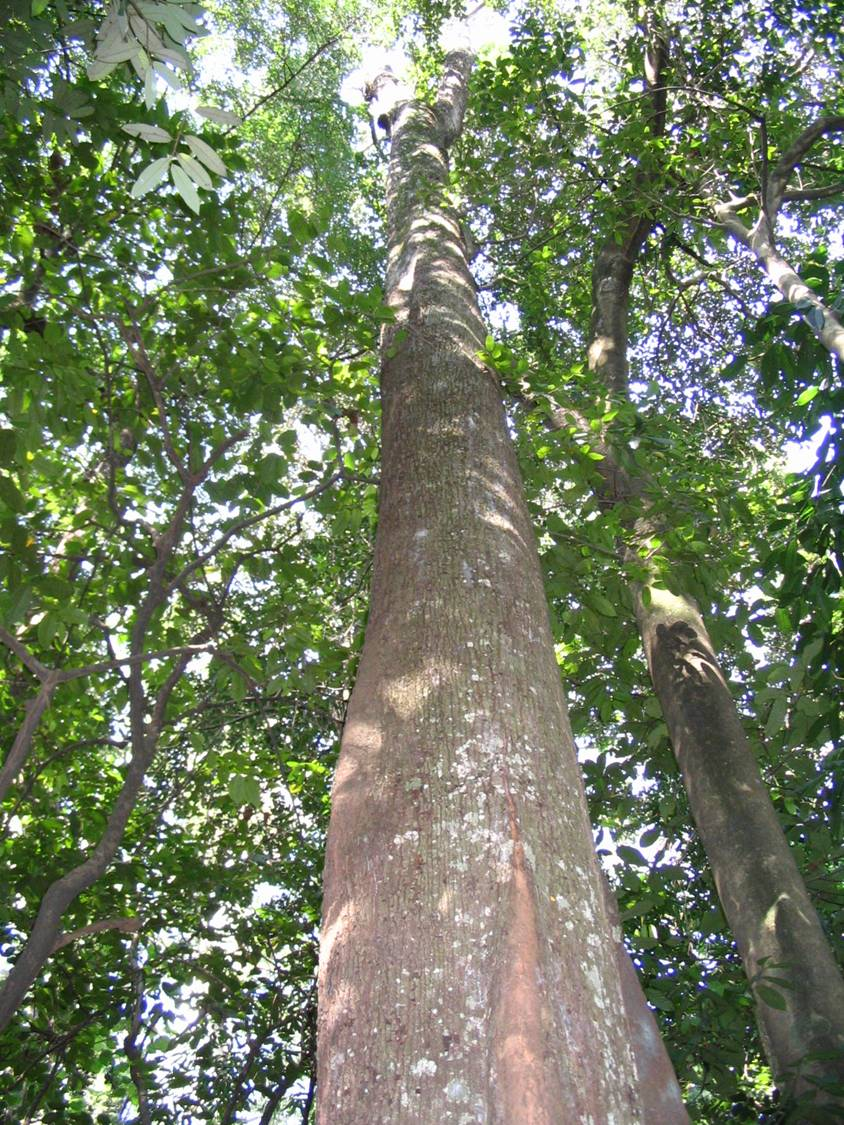

Conservation status
- Vulnerable (IUCN 2.3)

Scientific classification
- Kingdom: Plantae
- Clade: Tracheophytes
- Clade: Angiosperms
- Clade: Eudicots
- Clade: Rosids
- Order: Malvales
- Family: Malvaceae
- Subfamily: Helicteroideae
- Tribe: Durioneae
- Genus: Kostermansia; Soegeng
- Species: K. malayana

Binomial name
- Kostermansia malayana Soegeng

= Kostermansia =

Genus of trees

Kostermansia malayana, commonly known as the durian tuang or krepal, is a species of flowering plant in the mallow family, Malvaceae, that is endemic to Peninsular Malaysia. It is threatened by habitat loss.
