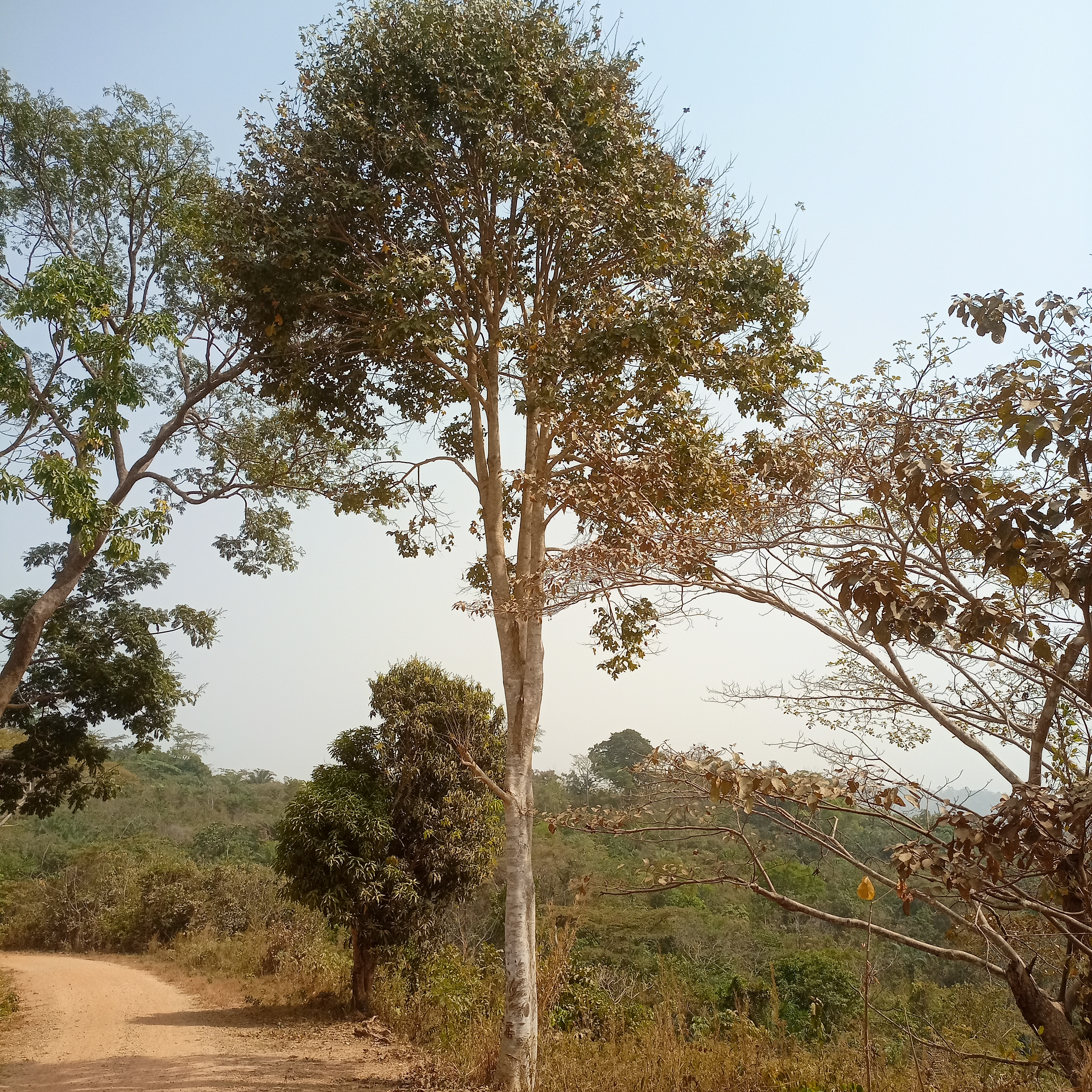
- Triplochiton scleroxylon in Togo

Scientific classification
- Kingdom: Plantae
- Clade: Tracheophytes
- Clade: Angiosperms
- Clade: Eudicots
- Clade: Rosids
- Order: Malvales
- Family: Malvaceae
- Subfamily: Helicteroideae
- Tribe: Helictereae
- Genus: Triplochiton; K.Schum.

Synonyms
- Samba Roberty

= Triplochiton =

Genus of flowering plants

Triplochiton is a genus of flowering plants in the family Malvaceae. It is a small genus of trees comprising tall tropical African trees with palmately lobed alternate leaves like those of the maple.

It is native to Tropical Africa, and found in the countries of Benin, Cameroon, Central African Republic, Congo, Equatorial Guinea, Gabon, Ghana, Guinea, Ivory Coast, Liberia, Nigeria, Sierra Leone, Togo, Zambia, Zaïre and Zimbabwe.

== Known species ==
As accepted by Kew;

- Triplochiton scleroxylon K.Schum. (African whitewood, Obeche and others, )
- Triplochiton zambesiacus Milne-Redh.

It was first described and published in Bot. Jahrb. Syst. Vol.28 on page 330 in 1900.
