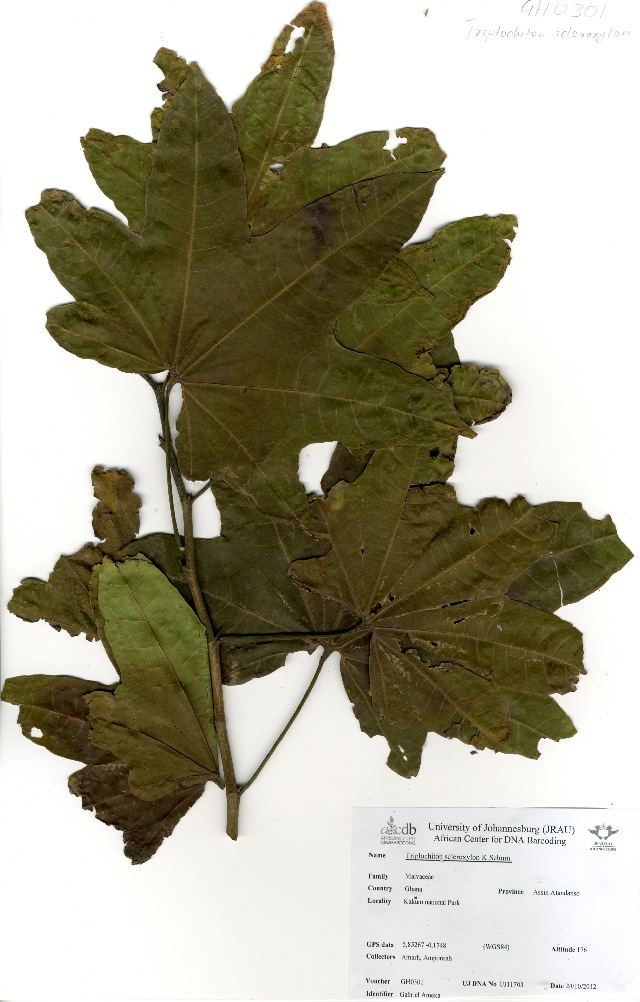
- Specimen collected in Kakum National Park, Ghana

Conservation status
- Least Concern (IUCN 2.3)

Scientific classification
- Kingdom: Plantae
- Clade: Tracheophytes
- Clade: Angiosperms
- Clade: Eudicots
- Clade: Rosids
- Order: Malvales
- Family: Malvaceae
- Genus: Triplochiton
- Species: T. scleroxylon

Binomial name
- Triplochiton scleroxylon K.Schum.

= Triplochiton scleroxylon =

Species of tree

Triplochiton scleroxylon is a tree of the genus Triplochiton of the family Malvaceae. The timber is known by the common names African whitewood, abachi, obeche (in Nigeria), wawa (in Ghana), ayous (in Cameroon) and sambawawa (in Ivory Coast). The tree is the official state tree of Ekiti State, Nigeria.

== Description ==
The species is distributed over the tropical areas of West Africa and Central Africa.

== Uses ==
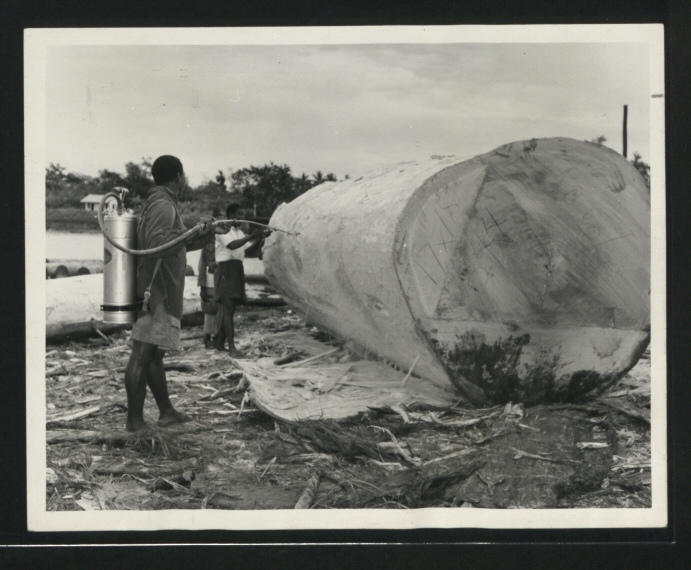
Workmen spraying the trunk of an obeche tree with Gammaxene to protect it against timber-boring insects

The timber yielded is typically pale yellow and is moderately soft and light for a hardwood.

Typical Ayous veneer

The timber is used in the manufacture of veneer, furniture, picture frames and mouldings. It is also used by guitar makers. Gibson and Fender Japan have used the wood to produce limited edition guitars.

The tree is a host of the African silk moth, Anaphe venata, whose caterpillars feed on the leaves and spin cocoons which are then used to make silk.

The wood is exploited in its natural habitat, a harvest that is unsustainable in some areas. However, it remains classed as 'least concern' on the IUCN Red List.
