= Durio kinabaluensis =

Scientific classification
- Kingdom: Plantae
- Clade: Tracheophytes
- Clade: Angiosperms
- Clade: Eudicots
- Clade: Rosids
- Order: Malvales
- Family: Malvaceae
- Genus: Durio
- Species: D. kinabaluensis

Binomial name
- Durio kinabaluensis Kosterm. & Soegeng 1958

Species of fruit tree

Durio kinabaluensis, also known as mountain durian and (locally) as durian tapuloh, is a forest tree in the mallow family.

== Description ==
The tree grows to 40 m in height with a 10–15 m buttressed bole. The oval leaves are 10–16 cm long by 4–6 cm wide, with smooth uppersides, and with undersides covered with golden-brown scales and hairs. The inflorescences comprise clusters of 5–6 pink to reddish flowers along the branches. The greenish yellow to yellow fruits are 8–10 cm in diameter, covered with small conical spines and containing 3 cm-long brown seeds encased in an edible, cream to pale yellow aril.

== Distribution and habitat ==
The species is endemic to Borneo; its range is restricted to the Crocker Range and Mount Kinabalu in Sabah, where it is found in hill forest and lower mountain forest at an elevation of 800–1300 m.

== Usage ==
The species is sometimes planted in the vicinity of villages in the Crocker Range, with the fruits sold at roadside stalls.
