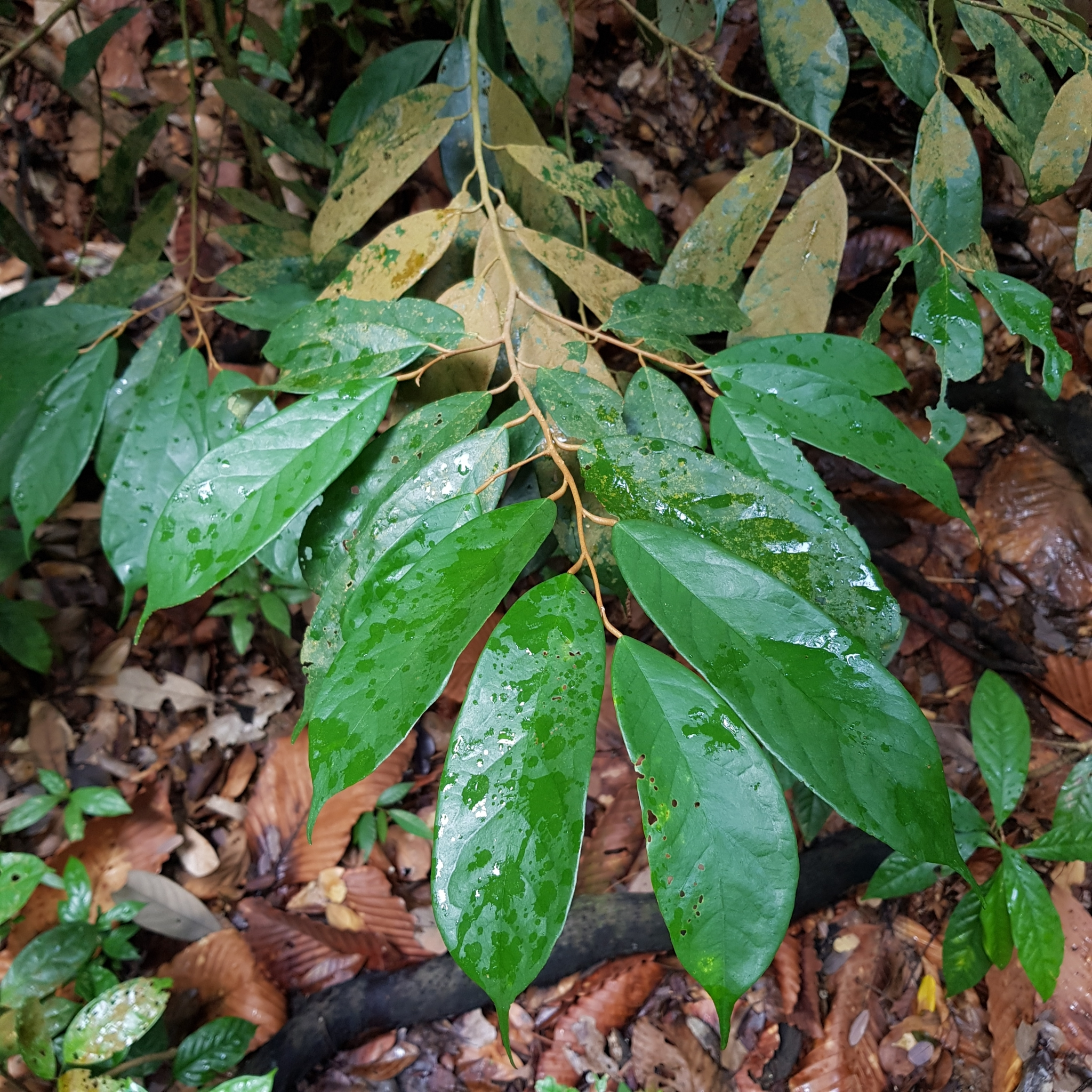
- Boschia griffithii in Singapore

Scientific classification
- Kingdom: Plantae
- Clade: Tracheophytes
- Clade: Angiosperms
- Clade: Eudicots
- Clade: Rosids
- Order: Malvales
- Family: Malvaceae
- Subfamily: Helicteroideae
- Tribe: Durioneae
- Genus: Boschia; Korth.

= Boschia =

Genus of flowering plants

Boschia is a genus of flowering plants belonging to the family Malvaceae.

Its native range is Indo-China and Malesia.

Species:

- Boschia excelsa Korth.
- Boschia grandiflora Mast.
- Boschia griffithii Mast.
- Boschia mansonii Gamble
- Boschia oblongifolia Ridl.
