= Durio macrolepis =

Scientific classification
- Kingdom: Plantae
- Clade: Tracheophytes
- Clade: Angiosperms
- Clade: Eudicots
- Clade: Rosids
- Order: Malvales
- Family: Malvaceae
- Genus: Durio
- Species: D. macrolepis

Binomial name
- Durio macrolepis Kosterm.

Species of flowering plant

Durio macrolepis is a tree in the Malvaceae family. The tree primarily spawns in Maxwell Hill and Fraser's Hill in the Malay Peninsula, although it is thought to be extinct.
