= Durio macrantha =

Scientific classification
- Kingdom: Plantae
- Clade: Tracheophytes
- Clade: Angiosperms
- Clade: Eudicots
- Clade: Rosids
- Order: Malvales
- Family: Malvaceae
- Genus: Durio
- Species: D. macrantha

Binomial name
- Durio macrantha Kosterm.

Species of tree

Durio macrantha is a species of durian.

The species was first found in Gunung Leuser National Park in Northern Sumatra in 1981. A specimen was then grown in the garden of botanist André Joseph Guillaume Henri Kostermans, who described it as a separate species based on his cultivated specimen. Despite several expeditions, additional specimens have not been found in the wild. The species has since been cultivated in Australia.

It was formally described in 1992. It is distinguished from other durian species by its large flowers. The tree itself is of smaller stature than other species, standing about 10 meters tall.
