= Durio crassipes =

Scientific classification
- Kingdom: Plantae
- Clade: Embryophytes
- Clade: Tracheophytes
- Clade: Spermatophytes
- Clade: Angiosperms
- Clade: Eudicots
- Clade: Rosids
- Order: Malvales
- Family: Malvaceae
- Genus: Durio
- Species: D. crassipes

Binomial name
- Durio crassipes Kosterm. & Soegeng

Species of flowering plant

Durio crassipes, also known as durian hutan in Malay, is a species of flowering plant in the mallow family that is endemic to Borneo.

== Description ==
The tree grows to 60 m in height with a 20 m buttressed bole. The oval leaves are 7–11 cm long by 2.5–3 cm wide, with smooth uppersides, and with undersides covered with brown scales and hairs. The inflorescences comprise clusters of 10 or more pink to red flowers along the branches. The fruits are 7–10 cm long by 5.5–7 cm wide, covered with 5 cm-long red spines, and containing 3 cm-long black seeds encased in an edible, creamy yellow aril.

== Distribution and habitat ==
The species is known only from Sabah and Sarawak, where it is found in mixed hill forest at an elevation of 500–700 m.

== Usage ==
Since the fruits open on the branches, with the contents eaten by squirrels and hornbills, humans must climb wild trees to get the fruits.
