= Durian Burung =

Town in Padang Terap region, Kedah, Malaysia

- Etymology: Malay word for Durio graveolens
- Durian Burung in Padang Terap District

- Location within Peninsular Malaysia Location within Malaysia
- Coordinates: 6°28′06.3″N 100°42′34.2″E
- Country: Malaysia
- State: Kedah
- District: Padang Terap
- Time zone: UTC+8 (MST)
  - Summer (DST): UTC+8 (Not observed)

Durian Burung is a small border town in Mukim Batang Tunggang Kiri, Padang Terap District, Kedah, Malaysia. Across the border is Ban Prakop of Songkhla, Thailand.

This border crossing is the second border crossing from Kedah state to Songkhla province; the other crossing is at Bukit Kayu Hitam at the Malaysian side and Sadao town at the Thai side.

The name comes from the Malay Durian Burung (lit. 'bird durian'), and refers to the durian species Durio graveolens.
