= Durio wyatt-smithii =

Conservation status
- Data Deficient (IUCN 2.3)

Scientific classification
- Kingdom: Plantae
- Clade: Tracheophytes
- Clade: Angiosperms
- Clade: Eudicots
- Clade: Rosids
- Order: Malvales
- Family: Malvaceae
- Genus: Durio
- Species: D. wyatt-smithii

Binomial name
- Durio wyatt-smithii Kosterm.

Species of tree

Durio wyatt-smithii is a species of flowering plant in the family Malvaceae. It is a tree endemic to Peninsular Malaysia.
