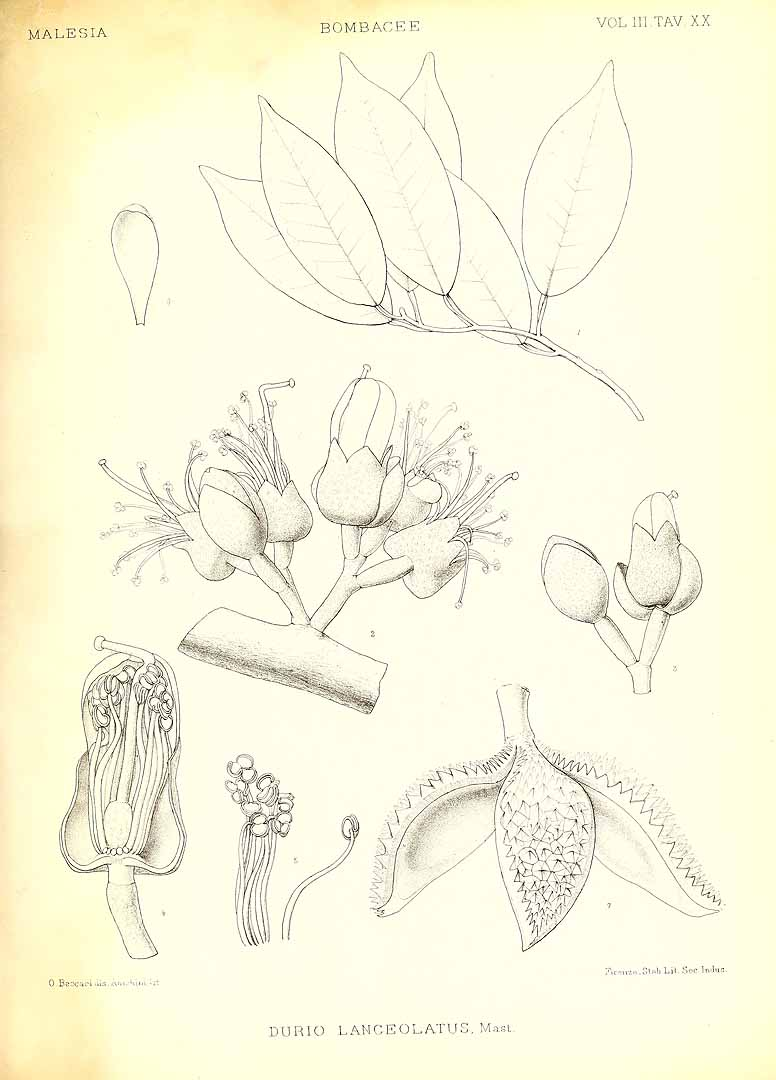

Conservation status
- Near Threatened (IUCN 3.1)

Scientific classification
- Kingdom: Plantae
- Clade: Tracheophytes
- Clade: Angiosperms
- Clade: Eudicots
- Clade: Rosids
- Order: Malvales
- Family: Malvaceae
- Genus: Durio
- Species: D. lanceolatus

Binomial name
- Durio lanceolatus Mast.

= Durio lanceolatus =

Species of flowering plant

Durio lanceolatus is a tree in the family Malvaceae. It grows up to 55 metres (180 ft) tall.

== Distribution and habitat ==
Durio lanceolatus is endemic to Borneo. Its habitat is mixed dipterocarp forests, at altitudes to around 1,100 m (4,000 ft).

== Uses ==
Durio lanceolatus is a source of durian timber, used in construction and furniture. The fruit of this species is not considered edible.

== Conservation ==
Durio lanceolatus has been assessed as near threatened on the IUCN Red List. The species is threatened by logging for its timber and conversion of forests for agricultural uses. Such conversions have increased the risk of fires. Mining is a threat in Kalimantan. Durio lanceolatus is found in protected areas including Gunung Mulu National Park and Gunung Gading National Park.
