= Coelostegia =

Scientific classification
- Kingdom: Plantae
- Clade: Tracheophytes
- Clade: Angiosperms
- Clade: Eudicots
- Clade: Rosids
- Order: Malvales
- Family: Malvaceae
- Genus: Coelostegia; Benth.

Genus of flowering plants

Coelostegia is a genus of flowering plants belonging to the family Malvaceae.

Its native range is Western Malesia.

Species:

- Coelostegia borneensis Becc.
- Coelostegia chartacea Soegeng
- Coelostegia griffithii Benth. & Hook.f.
- Coelostegia kostermansii Soegeng
- Coelostegia montana Sidiy.
- Coelostegia neesiocarpa Soegeng
