= Boschia griffithii =

Conservation status
- Least Concern (IUCN 3.1)

Scientific classification
- Kingdom: Plantae
- Clade: Embryophytes
- Clade: Tracheophytes
- Clade: Angiosperms
- Clade: Eudicots
- Clade: Rosids
- Order: Malvales
- Family: Malvaceae
- Genus: Boschia
- Species: B. griffithii

Binomial name
- Boschia griffithii Mast.

Synonyms
- Boschia acutifolia Mast.; Durio acutifolius (Mast.) Kosterm.; Durio griffithii (Mast.) Bakh.

Species of plant

Boschia griffithii is a species of durian tree in the family Malvaceae. It is a tree native to Borneo, Sumatra, Peninsular Malaysia, and Peninsular Thailand.

The species was first described by Maxwell T. Masters in 1875. It is known by a variety of synonyms, including Boschia acutifolia, Durio griffithii, and D. acutifolius.
