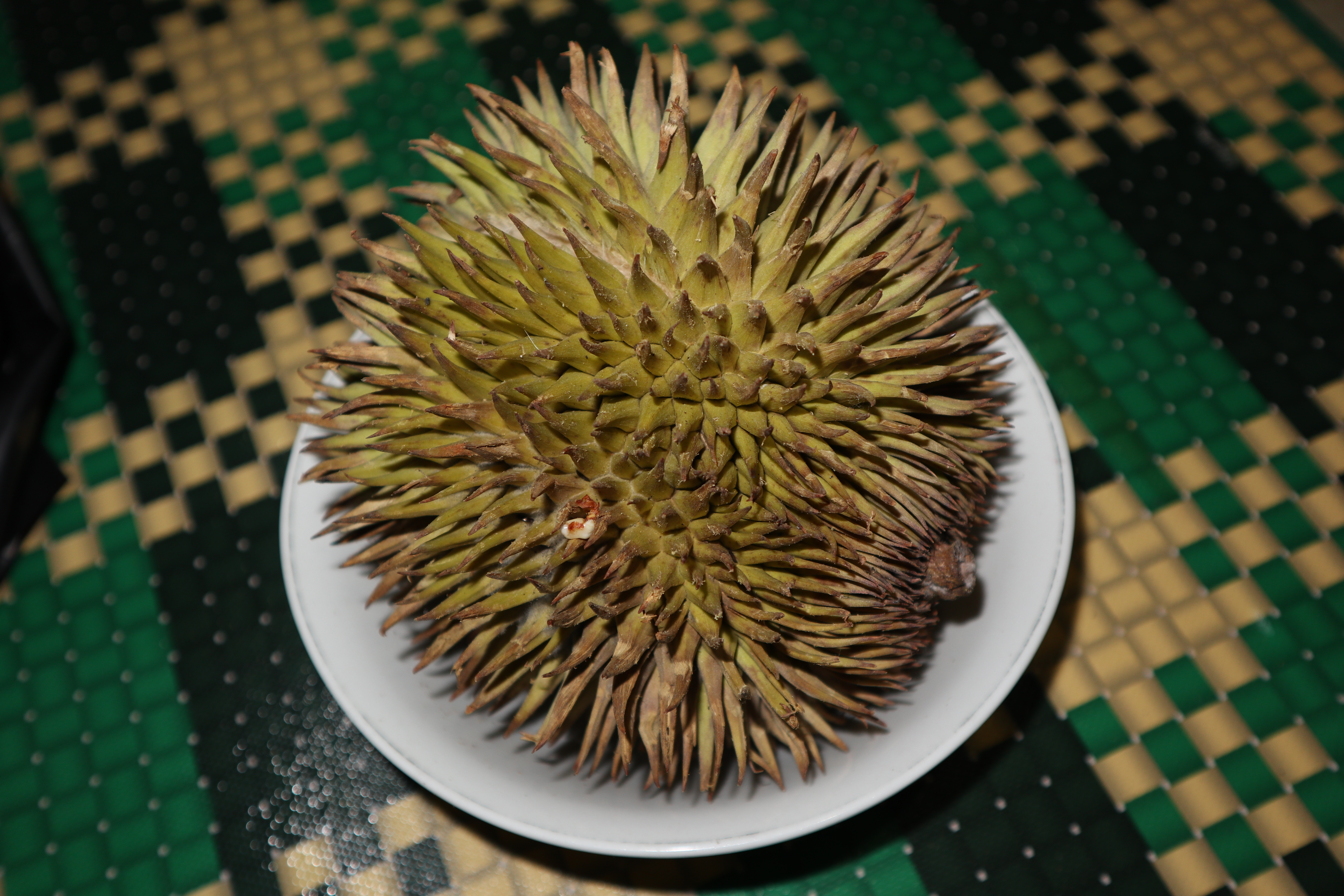

Conservation status
- Near Threatened (IUCN 3.1)

Scientific classification
- Kingdom: Plantae
- Clade: Tracheophytes
- Clade: Angiosperms
- Clade: Eudicots
- Clade: Rosids
- Order: Malvales
- Family: Malvaceae
- Genus: Durio
- Species: D. oxleyanus

Binomial name
- Durio oxleyanus Griff.

Synonyms
- Durio gratissimus Becc.; Neesia griffithii Planch. ex Mast.

= Durio oxleyanus =

Species of plant

Durio oxleyanus is a perennial plant species of tree in the family Malvaceae. It was once placed in the family Bombacaceae.

The IUCN list the species as near threatened.

It is a popular plant for food among humans and orangutans.

== Names ==
In English it goes by common names like isu, durian lai, oxleyanus durian, Durian Hutan, Durian, and Durian meragang.

The native names include: durian beludu in Malaysia; durian daun in Sumatra; durian sukang or simply sukang in Brunei and Sabah; and kerantongan or kerantungan in Kalimantan.

== Description ==
Trees in species can grow up to 45 meters or up to 50 meters tall and have dark brown bark. It has a self-supporting growth form too.

=== Fruits ===
The fruit the tree produces fruits that are edible. With a smooth creamy texture with a sweet flavor similar to banana or grape. The fruits are gray and are 15 to 20 centimeters in diameter.

Durio oxleyanus fruit at Haw Kee Orchard in Pantai, Negeri Sembilan, Malaysia. Note the relatively small size of the fruit and position on minor branches. 21 June 2026.

A pile (tumpuk) of Durio oxleyanus, known locally as Sukang, at a roadside stall in Penampang, Sabah (Kota Kinabalu-Tambunan road). 10 September 2026.

Size view of Durio oxleyanus fruit in Sabah. Note the long and curved "thorns". 10 September 2026.

Distal view of Durio oxleyanus fruit in Sabah. Note the four locules, a distinguishing characteristic of the species: fruit of other Durio fruit have five locules. 10 September 2026.

An American tourist savoring a fruit of Durio oxleyanus. Their milder flavor makes them more appealing to people who have not grown up with durian.

== Distribution ==
It is native to Borneo and Sumatra, Indonesia.

It can be found in more moist parts of lowland rainforests.

== Uses ==
It is rarely cultivated for food in its native area. The timber from this plant is used for building houses.

The species is also used for medicine to treat Malaria. In Indonesia, it is also used for ulcers and wounds. However, the plant has not been studied in pharmacology.

== Threats ==
They are classified as near threatened by the IUCN due to large deforestation of lowland forests. Development of urban areas, extension of agricultural land, industrial plantation, and mining are the influence for deforestation.
