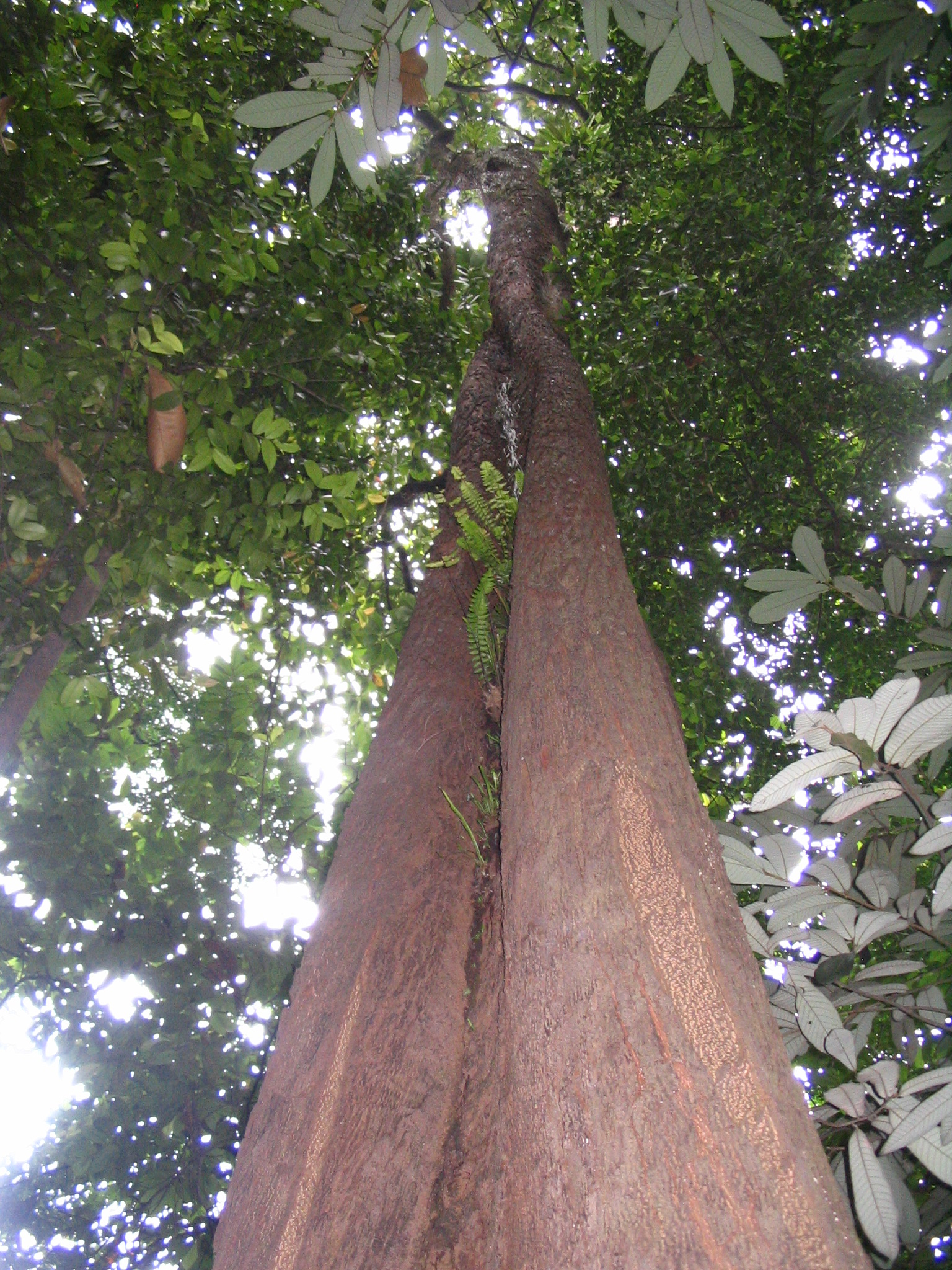
- Neesia malayana

Scientific classification
- Kingdom: Plantae
- Clade: Tracheophytes
- Clade: Angiosperms
- Clade: Eudicots
- Clade: Rosids
- Order: Malvales
- Family: Malvaceae
- Tribe: Durioneae
- Genus: Neesia; Blume (1835)

Synonyms
- Blumea Rchb. (1828), nom. illeg.; Cotylephora Meisn. (1837); Esenbeckia Blume (1825)

= Neesia =

Genus of plants

Neesia is a genus of flowering plants in the Malvaceae family. It contains eight species, which are native to Thailand, Peninsular Malaysia, Sumatra, Borneo, and Java.

== Species ==
Eight species are currently accepted:

- Neesia altissima (Blume) Blume – Thailand, Peninsular Malaysia, and Java
- Neesia ambigua Becc. – Borneo
- Neesia glabra Becc. – Borneo
- Neesia kostermansiana Soepadmo – Thailand and western Peninsular Malaysia
- Neesia malayana Bakh. – Peninsular Thailand, Peninsular Malaysia, and Sumatra
- Neesia piluliflora Becc. – Peninsular Malaysia and Borneo
- Neesia purpurascens Becc. – Borneo
- Neesia synandra Mast. – Peninsular Malaysia
