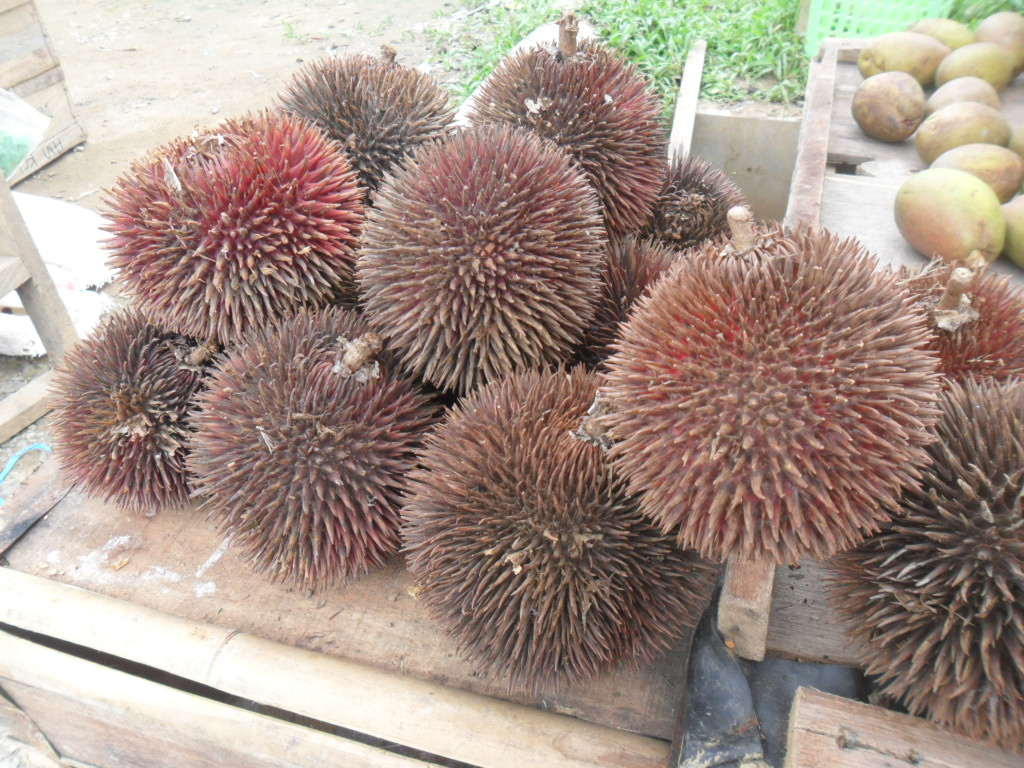

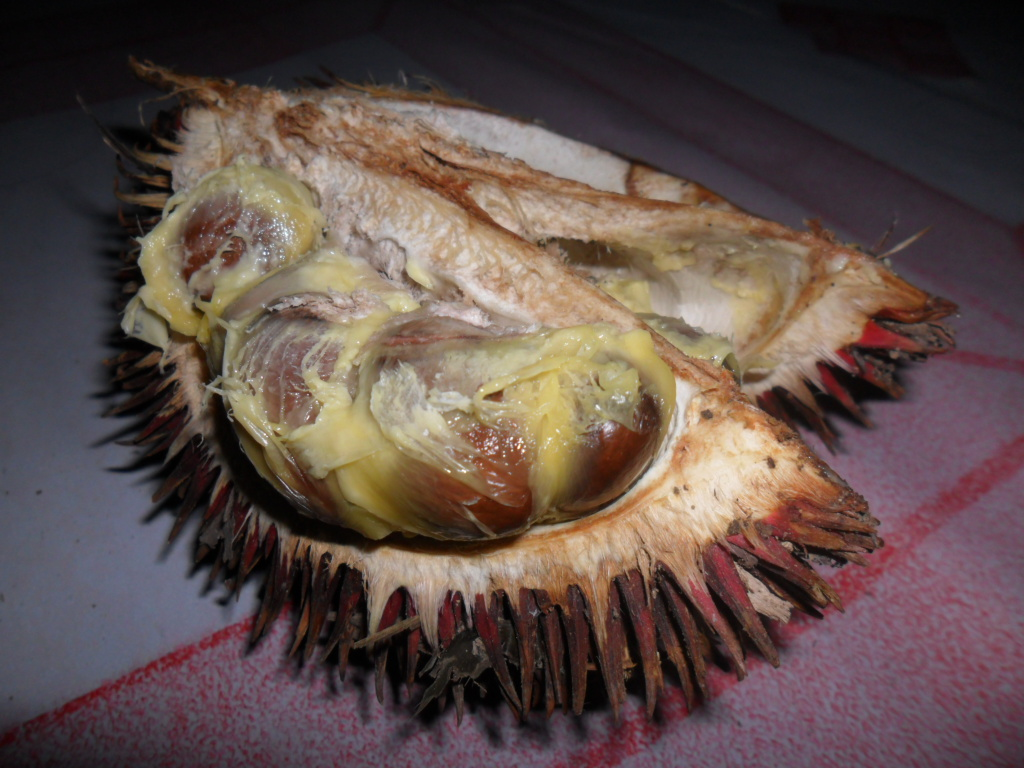

Conservation status
- Vulnerable (IUCN 2.3)

Scientific classification
- Kingdom: Plantae
- Clade: Tracheophytes
- Clade: Angiosperms
- Clade: Eudicots
- Clade: Rosids
- Order: Malvales
- Family: Malvaceae
- Genus: Durio
- Species: D. dulcis

Binomial name
- Durio dulcis Becc.

= Durio dulcis =

Species of tree

Durio dulcis, known as durian merah in Malay, layung or pesasang in Tidung, is a tree species in the genus Durio.

== Description ==
The tree can grow up to 40 metres (130 feet) tall. The leaves are elliptical, 7–14 centimetres (2 3/4–5 1/2 inches) long, and scaly on the underside.

The husk of its fruit is dark red to brown-red, and covered with slender spines 15–20 millimetres (1/2–3/4 in) in length. The fruit flesh is dark yellow, thin, and deep caramel-flavored, with a turpentine odor. The fruit of this species is considered by many to be the sweetest of all durians.
