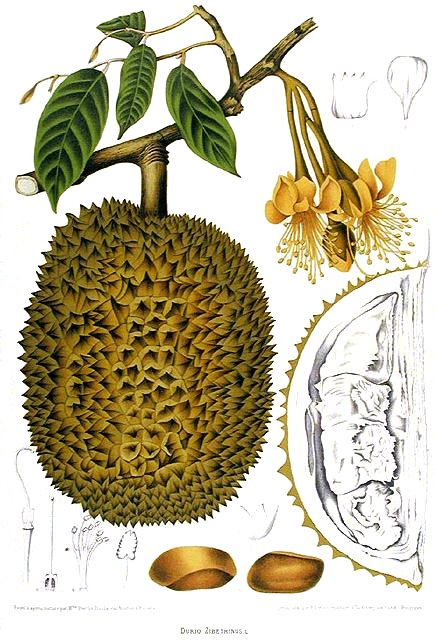

Scientific classification
- Kingdom: Plantae
- Clade: Embryophytes
- Clade: Tracheophytes
- Clade: Angiosperms
- Clade: Eudicots
- Clade: Rosids
- Order: Malvales
- Family: Malvaceae
- Genus: Durio
- Species: D. zibethinus

Binomial name
- Durio zibethinus L.
- Native distribution Exotic distribution

Synonyms
- Durio acuminatissimus Merr.; Durio stercoraceus Noronha nom. inval.

= Durio zibethinus =

Species of tree

Durio zibethinus is the most common tree species in the genus Durio, commonly known as durian, and has edible fruits by the same name.

As with most other durian species, the edible flesh emits a distinctive odour that is strong and penetrating even when the husk is intact. Some people regard the durian as having a pleasantly sweet fragrance; others find the aroma overpowering and revolting. The persistence of its odour has led to the fruit's banishment from certain hotels and public transportation in Southeast Asia.

There are 30 recognised Durio species, at least nine of which produce edible fruit. D. zibethinus is the only species available in the international market: other species are sold in their local regions. There are hundreds of cultivars of D. zibethinus; many consumers express preferences for specific cultivars, which fetch higher prices in the market.

== Etymology ==
The generic epithet is derived from the Malay word duri (thorn), for the fruit spines. The name of the specific epithet, zibethinus, is from the Italian zibetto (civet), representing the strong odour of the fruit similar to the smell of a civet cat.

== Description ==
Growing in wild forests, the tree is about 45 m (148 ft) tall with dark, red-brown bark. Its leaves are lanceolate-elliptic, about 10–15 cm (3.9–5.9 in) long and 3–4 cm (1.2–1.6 in) wide. Durian fruit varies in diameter from 15–25 cm (5.9–9.8 in), and has green to yellow-brown skin colour, with spines variable in length and shape.

The tree flowers once or twice a year, with flowers opening at night when pollination occurs by moths and various night insects. The cave-nectar bat, Eonycteris spelaea, also pollinates durian flowers. The flowers open in the afternoon and shed pollen in the evening. By the following morning, the calyx, petals, and stamens have fallen off to leave only the gynoecium of the flower.

The ripening seasons in Malaysia are from November to February and June to August. Animals propagating durian seeds include elephants, monkeys, civet cats, tigers, and deer, which forage by attraction to the durian scent, feeding on the fruit and seeds, which are later dispersed.

The origin of the species is a range from Malaysia to Borneo, and has been cultivated in tropical Asia over centuries. It is the most highly prized fruit in Singapore.

== Food uses ==
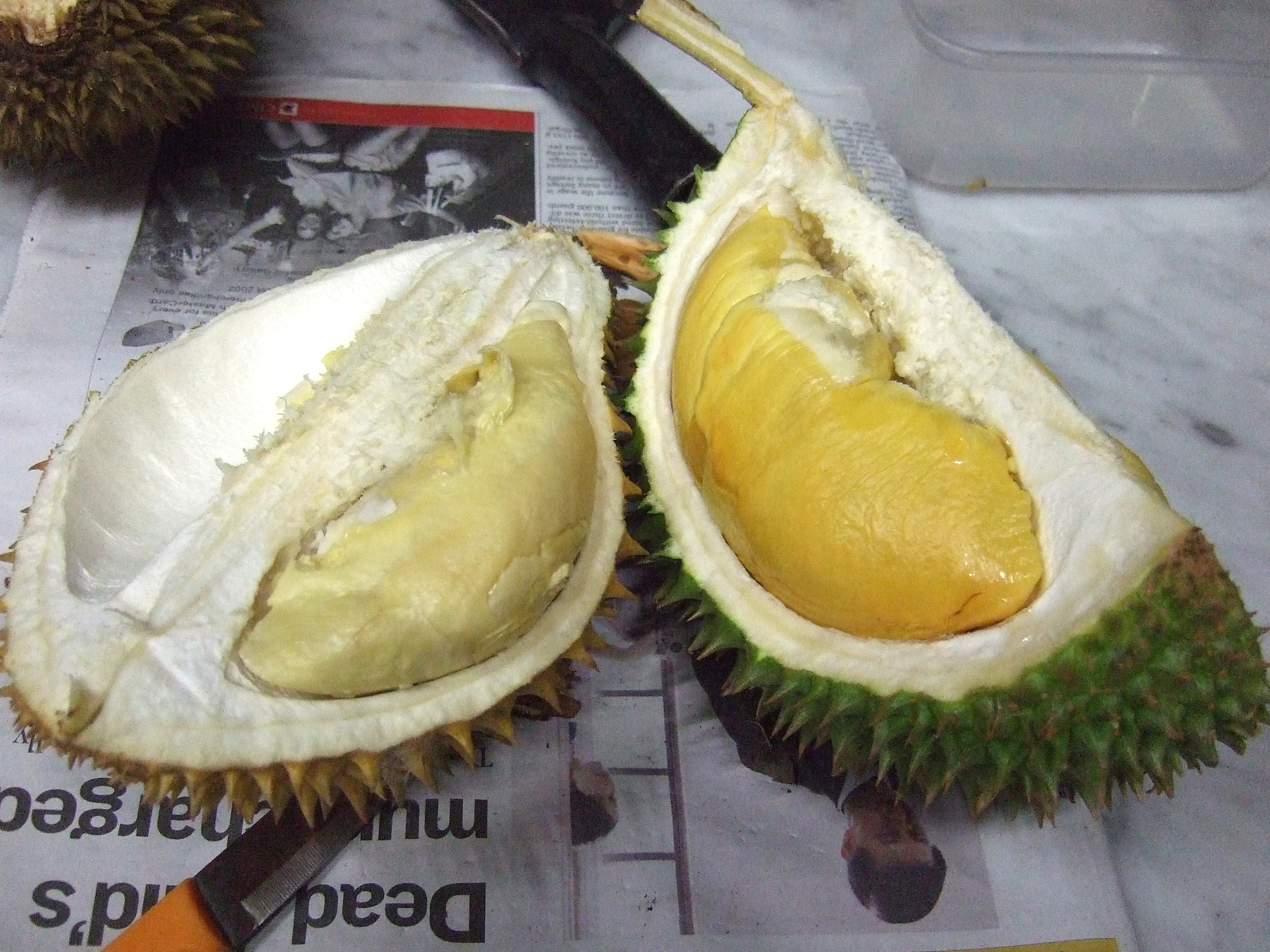
Different cultivars of durian often have distinct colours. D101 (right) has rich yellow flesh, clearly distinguishable from another variety (left).

Genomic information
- NCBI ID: 66656
- Ploidy: diploid
- Genome size: 715.23
- Number of chromosomes: 56
- Year of completion: 2017

The flavour quality of durian fruit is best when the tree is 30 to 60 years old. Over the centuries, numerous durian cultivars, propagated by vegetative clones, have arisen in southeast Asia. Durians used to be grown from seeds of trees bearing superior quality fruit, with mixed results. Cultivars are now reliably propagated by layering, marcotting, or more commonly, by grafting, including bud, veneer, wedge, whip or U-grafting onto seedlings of randomly selected rootstocks. Different cultivars may be distinguished to some extent by variations in the fruit shape, such as the shape of the spines. Durian consumers express preferences for specific cultivars, which fetch higher prices in the market.

Most cultivars have both a common name and a code number starting with "D". For example, some popular clones are Kop (D99 Thai: กบ – "frog" [kòp]), Chanee (D123, Thai: ชะนี – gibbon [tɕʰániː]), Berserah or Green Durian or Tuan Mek Hijau (D145 Thai: ทุเรียนเขียว – Green Durian [tʰúriːən kʰǐow]), Kan Yao (D158, Thai: ก้านยาว – Long Stem [kâːn jaːw]), Mon Thong (D159, Thai: หมอนทอง – Golden Pillow [mɔ̌ːn tʰɔːŋ]), Kradum Thong (Thai: กระดุมทอง – Golden Button [kràdum tʰɔːŋ]), and with no common name, D24 and D169. Each cultivar has a distinct taste and odour. More than 200 cultivars of D. zibethinus exist in Thailand.

Mon thong is the most sought after cultivar commercially for its thick, full-bodied creamy and mild sweet tasting flesh with relatively moderate smell emitted and smaller seeds, while Chanee is the best in terms of its resistance to infection by Phytophthora palmivora. Kan Yao is somewhat less common, but prized for its longer time window when it is both sweet and odourless. Among all the cultivars in Thailand, five are in large-scale commercial cultivation: Chanee, Mon Thong, Kan Yao, Ruang, and Kradum.

There have been more than 100 registered cultivars since the 1920s in Malaysia and up to 193 cultivars by 1992. Many superior cultivars have been identified through competitions held at the annual Malaysian Agriculture, Horticulture, and Agrotourism Show. In Vietnam, the same process has been achieved through competitions held by the Southern Fruit Research Institute. A new variety is Musang King.

By 2007, the Thai government scientist Songpol Somsri had crossbred more than ninety varieties of durian to create Chantaburi No. 1, a cultivar without the characteristic odour. Another hybrid, Chantaburi No. 3, develops the odour about three days after the fruit is picked, which enables an odourless transport yet satisfies consumers who prefer the pungent odour. On 22 May 2012, two other cultivars from Thailand that also lack the usual odour, Long Laplae and Lin Laplae, were presented to the public by Yothin Samutkhiri, governor of Uttaradit Province, from where these cultivars were developed locally, and announced the dates for the yearly durian fair of Laplae District, and the names given to both cultivars.

Raw durian (Durio zibethinus)
Nutritional value per 100 g (3.5 oz)
- Energy: 615 kJ (147 kcal)
- Carbohydrates: 27.09 g
- Dietary fiber: 3.8 g
- Fat: 5.33 g
- Protein: 1.47 g
Vitamins and minerals
Vitamins	Quantity %DV^{†}
Vitamin A	44 IU
Thiamine (B1)	31% 0.374 mg
Riboflavin (B2)	15% 0.2 mg
Niacin (B3)	7% 1.074 mg
Pantothenic acid (B5)	5% 0.23 mg
Vitamin B6	19% 0.316 mg
Folate (B9)	9% 36 μg
Vitamin C	22% 19.7 mg
Minerals	Quantity %DV^{†}
Calcium	0% 6 mg
Copper	23% 0.207 mg
Iron	2% 0.43 mg
Magnesium	7% 30 mg
Manganese	14% 0.325 mg
Phosphorus	3% 39 mg
Potassium	15% 436 mg
Sodium	0% 2 mg
Zinc	3% 0.28 mg
- Other constituents: Quantity
- Water: 65 g
- Link to USDA database entry
- ^{†}Percentages estimated using US recommendations for adults, except for potassium, which is estimated based on expert recommendation from the National Academies.

== Nutrition ==
Raw durian is 65% water, 27% carbohydrates, 5% fat, and 1% protein (table). In a reference amount of 100 g (3.5 oz), raw durian supplies 147 calories of food energy, and is a rich source (20% or more of the Daily Value, DV) of vitamin C (22% DV), thiamine (31% DV), and the dietary mineral, copper (23% DV) (table). Raw durian is a moderate source (10–19% DV) of the B vitamins, riboflavin and vitamin B6, and the minerals, manganese and potassium (table).

== See also ==
- Breadfruit, an unrelated fruit that looks similar
- Jackfruit, an unrelated fruit that looks similar
