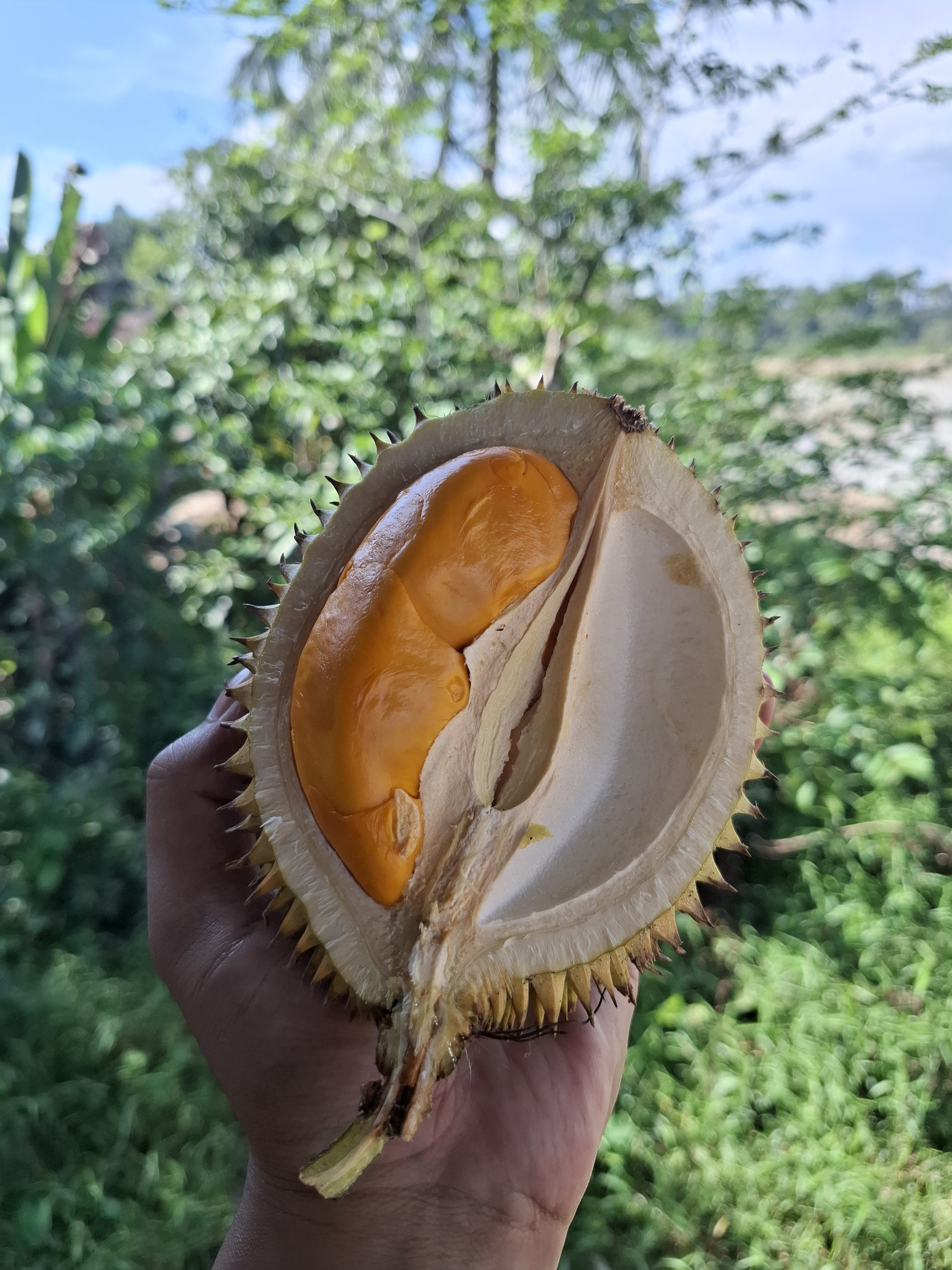
- Durio kutejensis fruits

Conservation status
- Vulnerable (IUCN 2.3)

Scientific classification
- Kingdom: Plantae
- Clade: Tracheophytes
- Clade: Angiosperms
- Clade: Eudicots
- Clade: Rosids
- Order: Malvales
- Family: Malvaceae
- Genus: Durio
- Species: D. kutejensis

Binomial name
- Durio kutejensis Hassk. & Becc.

= Durio kutejensis =

Species of tree

Durio kutejensis, commonly known as durian pulu, durian merah, nyekak, pakan, kuluk, or lai, is a primary rainforest substorey fruit tree from Borneo.

== Description ==
It is a very attractive small- to medium-sized tree up to 30 m tall. It has large, glossy leaves, numerous large, red flowers that emit a strong carrion smell at anthesis. This species is reportedly pollinated by giant honey bees and birds, as well as bats. The large durian fruit it bears has thick, yellow flesh with a mild, sweet taste and creamy texture similar to that of Durio zibethinus. It bears fruit late in the season.

== Usage ==
It is cultivated in Indonesia and has been introduced to Queensland. In Brunei, the fruit of D. kutejensis is preferred by local consumers over that of D. zibethinus, though the latter is the only durian species available in the international market. The fruit is also said to have fewer of the unpleasant flavors that D. zibethinus has.

== Gallery ==
Durio kutejensis, fruit

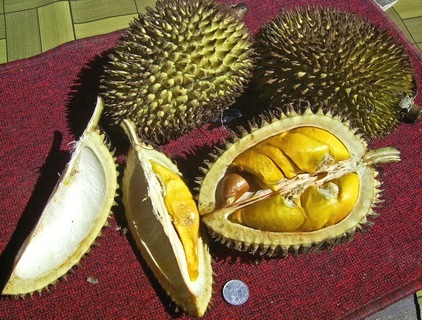
fruit, Muara Lawa, Kutai Barat, East Kalimantan, Indonesia

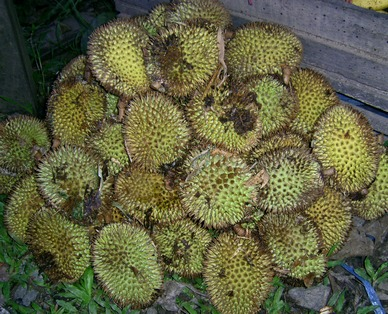
fruit, sold at roadside market in Muara Lawa, Kutai Barat, East Kalimantan, Indonesia

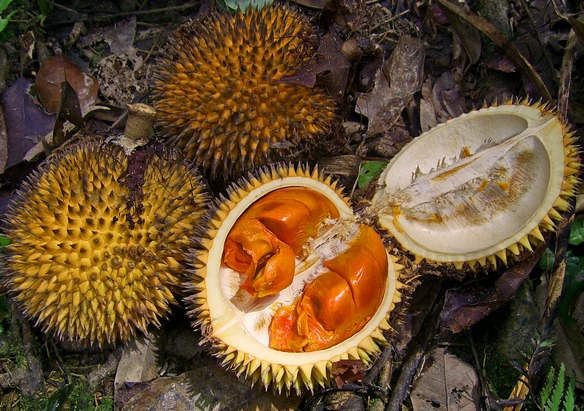
fruit from Sungai Utik, Kapuas Hulu, West Kalimantan, Indonesia

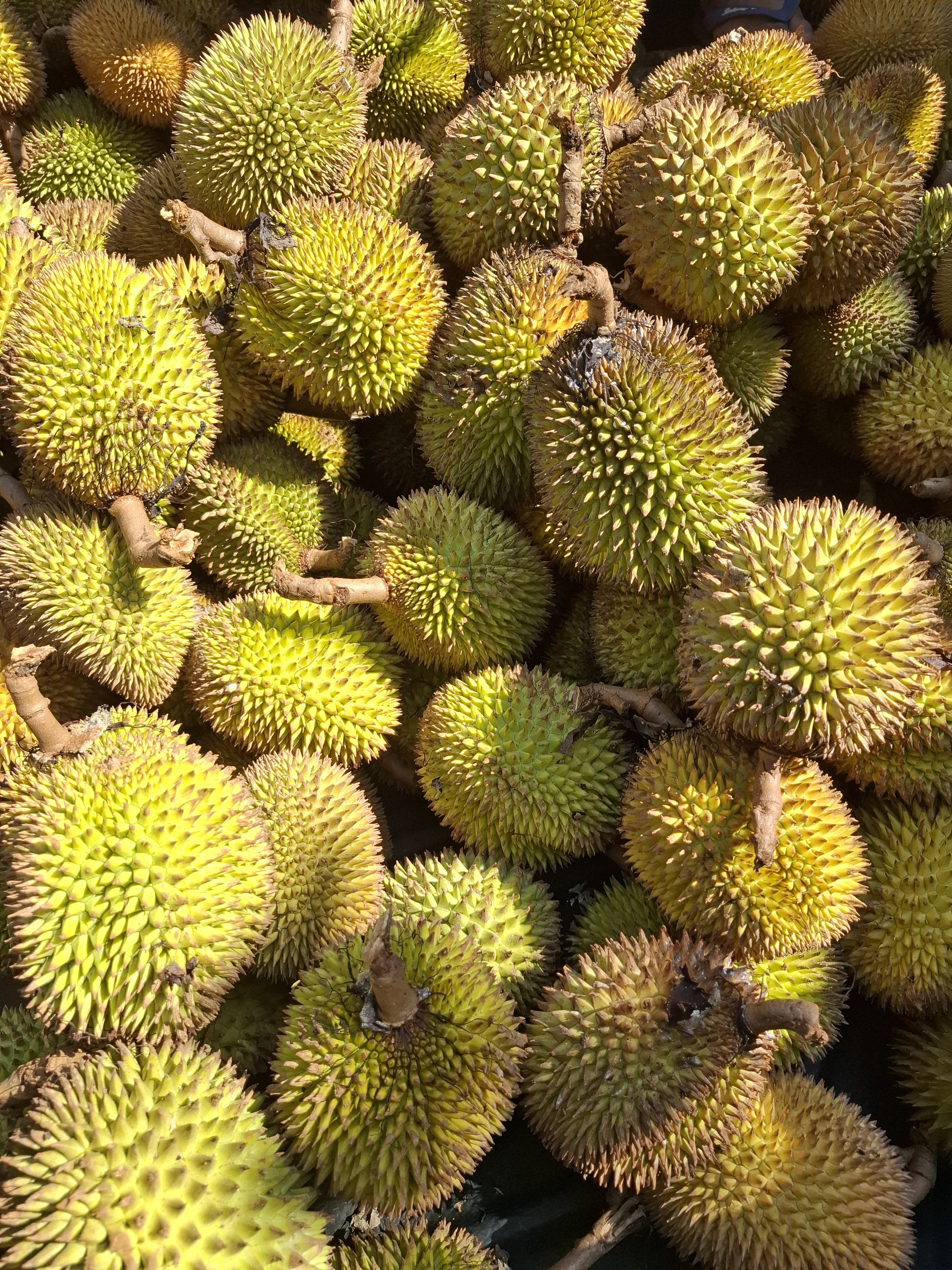
fruit from Kuala Kurun, Gunung Mas Regency, Central Kalimantan, Indonesia
