= Bombacaceae =

Family of flowering plants

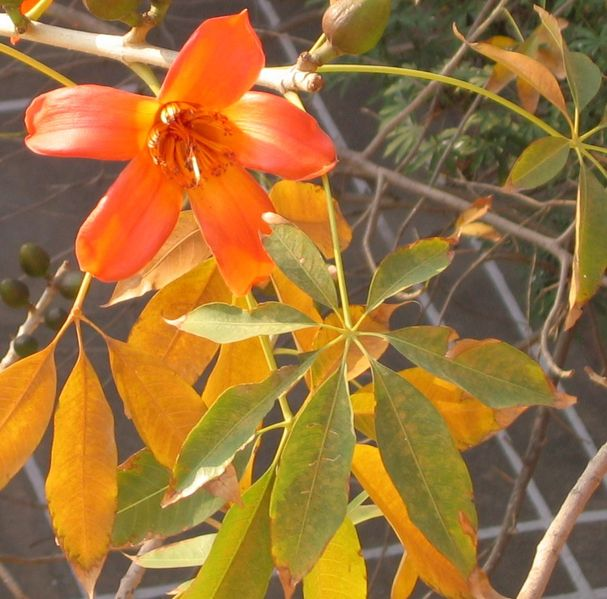
Bombax ceiba flower

Bombacaceae were long recognised as a family of flowering plants or Angiospermae. The family name was based on the type genus Bombax. As is true for many botanical names, circumscription and status of the taxon has varied with taxonomic point of view, and currently the preference is to transfer most of the erstwhile family Bombacaceae to the subfamily Bombacoideae within the family Malvaceae in the order Malvales. The rest of the family were transferred to other taxa, notably the new family Durionaceae. Irrespective of current taxonomic status, many of the species originally included in the Bombacaceae are of considerable ecological, historical, horticultural, and economic importance, such as balsa, kapok, baobab and durian.

== Current taxonomy ==
Recent phylogenetic research has shown that Bombacaceae as traditionally circumscribed (including tribe Durioneae) is not a monophyletic group. Bombacaceae is no longer recognized by the Angiosperm Phylogeny Group I 1998, II 2003 and Kubitzki system 2003 at the rank of family, the bulk of the taxa in question being treated as subfamilies Bombacoideae and Helicteroideae within family Malvaceae sensu lato. A close relationship between Bombacaceae and Malvaceae has long been recognized but until recently the families have been kept separate in most classification systems, and continue to be separated in many references, including the reference work in classification of flowering plants: Heywood et al. 2007 and Takhtajan 2009, but have been lumped together in Angiosperm Phylogeny Website.

Heywood et al. say "although closely related to Malvaceae, molecular data supports their separation. Only pollen and habit seem to provide a morphological basis for the separation." On the other hand, they say: "One approach is to lump them [the families in the core Malvales, including Bombacaceae] all into a 'super' Malvaceae, recognizing them as subfamilies. The other, taken here, is to recognize each of these ten groups as families."

As circumscribed in its traditional sense, the family Bombacaceae includes around 30 genera (25 genera after Heywood et al.) with about 250 species of tropical trees, some of considerable girth, so called "bottle trees". Many species grow to become large trees, with Ceiba pentandra the tallest, reaching a height to 70 m. Several of the genera are commercially important, producing timber, edible fruit or useful fibres. The family is noted for some of the softest hardwoods commercially traded, especially balsa, Ochroma lagopus. The fruit of the durian, Durio zibethinus is famous, tasting better than it smells. At one time kapok fibre from the tree Ceiba pentandra was used in making lifebuoys. The baobabs or "bottle trees" (Adansonia spp.) are important icons in certain parts of Africa, Australia and Madagascar, noted for their immensely stout trunk development, a mechanism for enhancing water storage.

== Genera ==
- Adansonia L.
- Aguiaria Ducke
- Bernoullia Oliv.
- Bombax L.
- Catostemma Benth.
- Cavanillesia Ruiz & Pav.
- Ceiba Mill.
- Chiranthodendron Larreat. (according to Kubitzki in subf. Bombacoideae and considered more closely related to Fremontodendron by Baum et al. 2004)
- Eriotheca Schott & Endl.
- Fremontodendron Coville (according to Heywood et al.)
- Gyranthera Pittier
- Huberodendron Ducke
- Matisia Bonpl.
- Neobuchia Urb.
- Ochroma Sw.
- Pachira Aubl.
- Patinoa Cuatrec.
- Pentaplaris L.O.Williams & Standl. (according to Kubitzki in subf. Bombacoideae, but incertae sedis)
- Phragmotheca Cuatrec.
- Pseudobombax Dugand
- Quararibea Aubl.
- Scleronema Benth.
- Septotheca Ulbr.
- Spirotheca Ulbr. (according to Heywood et al.)

Genera of tribe Durioneae excluded from Bombacaceae after Heywood et al. 2007 and that should be included in Durionaceae

- Boschia Korth.
- Coelostegia Benth.
- Cullenia Wight
- Durio Adans.
- Kostermansia Soegeng
- Neesia Blume

Genus that should be excluded from Bombacaceae after Heywood et al. 2007 and that be included in Malvaceae s. s.

- Camptostemon Mast.

Genera considered synonym after Kubitzki 2003

- Bombacopsis Pittier = Pachira Aubl.
- Chorisia Kunth = Ceiba Mill.
- Rhodognaphalon (Ulbr.) Roberty = Pachira Aubl.

Genus not treated in Kubitzki

- Lahia Hassk., synonym of Durio, according to Mabberley
