= Phragmotheca rubriflora =

Conservation status
- Endangered (IUCN 3.1)

Scientific classification
- Kingdom: Plantae
- Clade: Tracheophytes
- Clade: Angiosperms
- Clade: Eudicots
- Clade: Rosids
- Order: Malvales
- Family: Malvaceae
- Genus: Phragmotheca
- Species: P. rubriflora

Binomial name
- Phragmotheca rubriflora Fern.Alonso

Species of flowering plant

Phragmotheca rubriflora is a species of flowering plant in the family Malvaceae. It is found only in Colombia.
