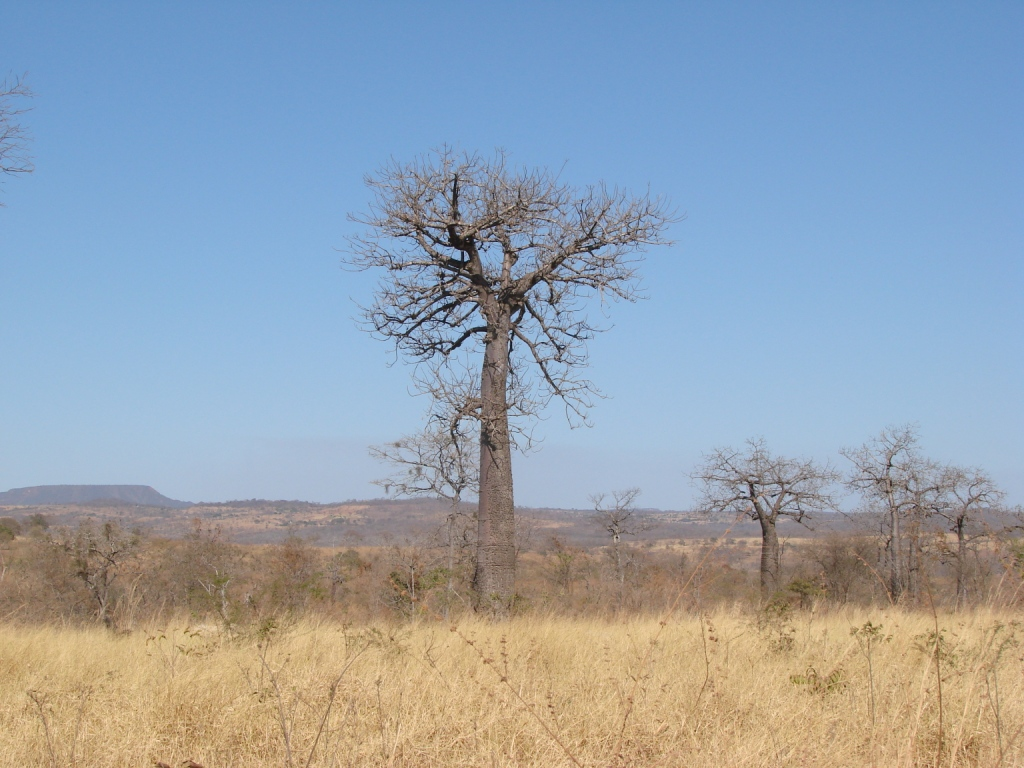

Scientific classification
- Kingdom: Plantae
- Clade: Tracheophytes
- Clade: Angiosperms
- Clade: Eudicots
- Clade: Rosids
- Order: Malvales
- Family: Malvaceae
- Genus: Cavanillesia
- Species: C. arborea

Binomial name
- Cavanillesia arborea (Willd.) K.Schum.

= Cavanillesia arborea =

Species of flowering plant

Cavanillesia arborea (common name barrigudo or American baobab) is a flowering plant in the subfamily Bombacoideae of the family Malvaceae, native to the Caatinga region of central and eastern Brazil. Fully mature specimens can have the appearance of a baobab (Adansonia digitata), but they can also assume the shape of a huge rugby ball or an American football, growing from a small base, swelling in the middle to as much as 5 metres (16 ft), and then constricting again just beneath the branches.
