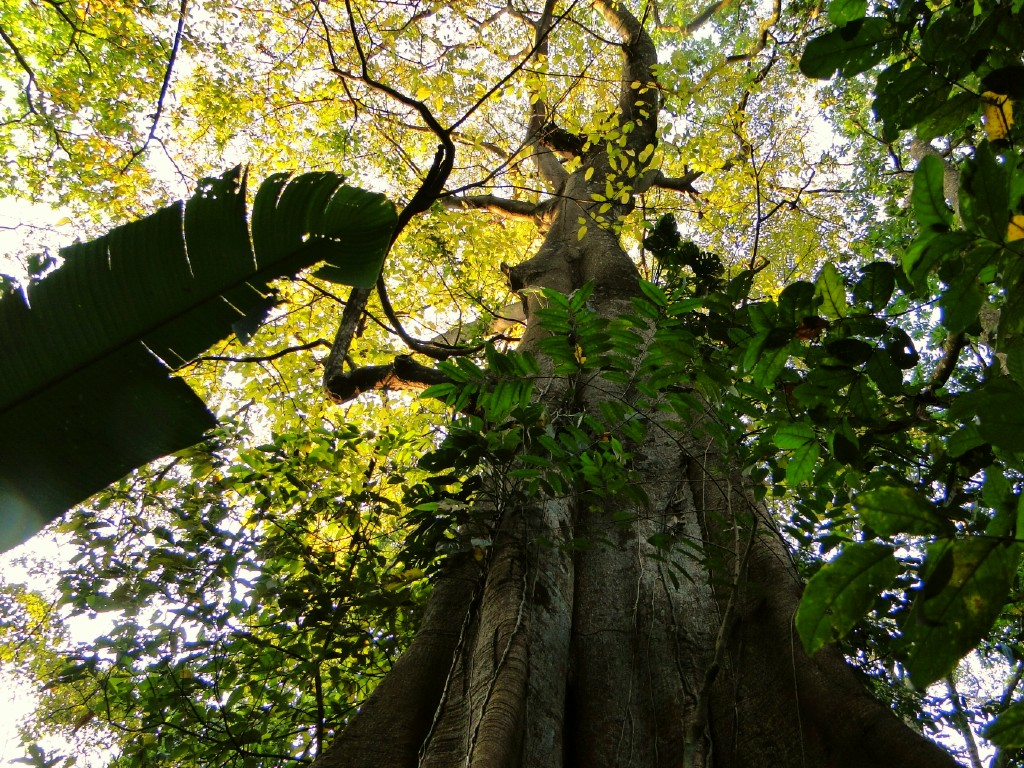

Scientific classification
- Kingdom: Plantae
- Clade: Tracheophytes
- Clade: Angiosperms
- Clade: Eudicots
- Clade: Rosids
- Order: Malvales
- Family: Malvaceae
- Genus: Gyranthera
- Species: G. caribensis

Binomial name
- Gyranthera caribensis Pittier

= Gyranthera caribensis =

Species of flowering plant

Gyranthera caribensis is a large tree in the tropical rainforests of northern Venezuela, where it is endemic in the Venezuelan Coastal Range. Traditionally placed in the baobab family, which is now a subfamily Bombacoideae of the family Malvaceae. One notable individual called "El Piè Grande" ("Bigfoot"), near Orqueta in Yaracuy State in northern Venezuela, has a height of 63.43 m and a girth of 17.12 m.

The tree was described by the botanist Henri François Pittier in 1921.
