= Gyranthera darienensis =

Cucarrón

Conservation status
- Least Concern (IUCN 3.1)

Scientific classification
- Kingdom: Plantae
- Clade: Tracheophytes
- Clade: Angiosperms
- Clade: Eudicots
- Clade: Rosids
- Order: Malvales
- Family: Malvaceae
- Genus: Gyranthera
- Species: G. darienensis

Binomial name
- Gyranthera darienensis Pittier

Species of flowering plant

Gyranthera darienensis, the cucarrón or cucharón, is a species of flowering plant in the Malvaceae sensu lato or family Bombacaceae. It is found only in Panama. It is threatened by habitat loss.
