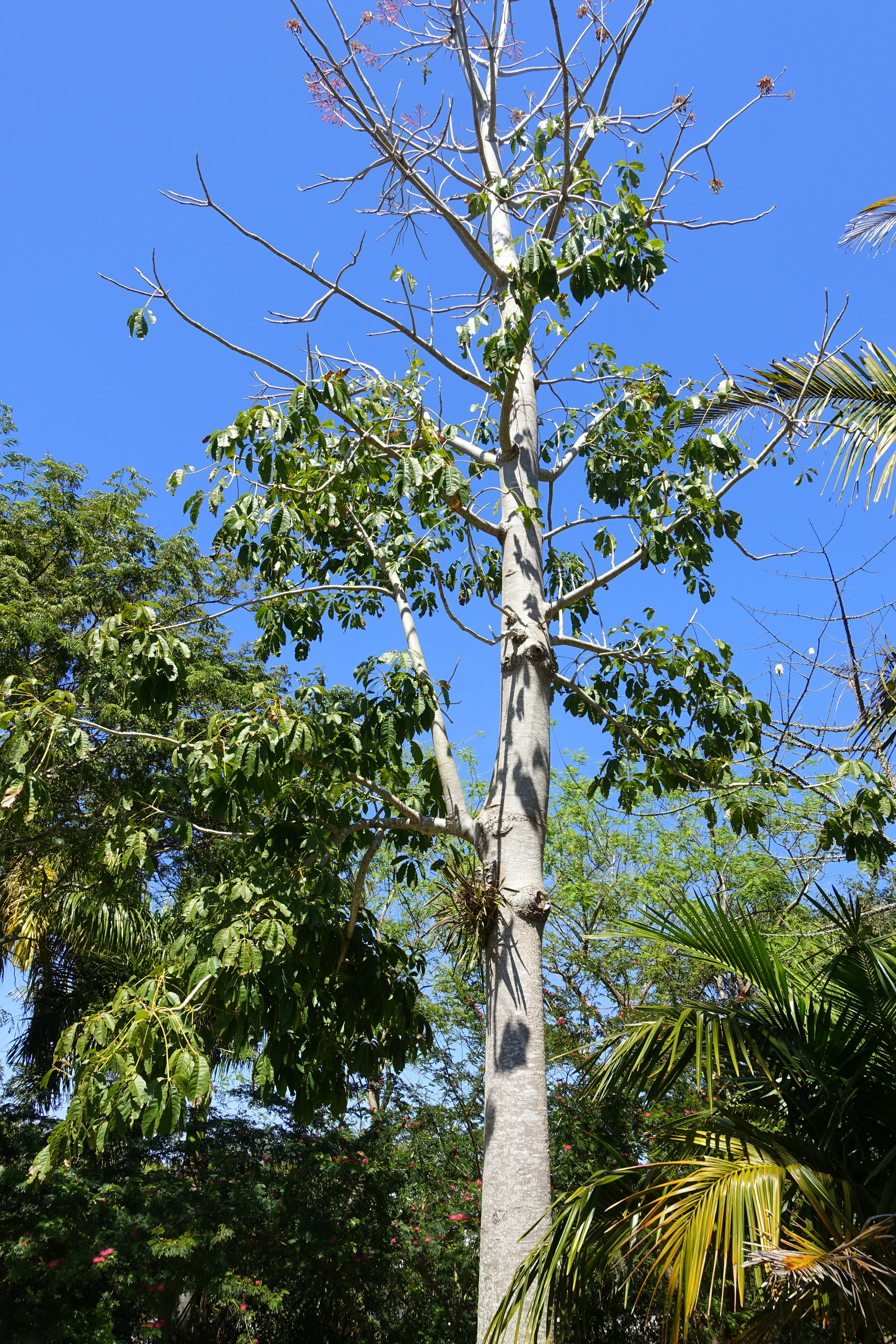
- Bernoullia flammea at Naples Botanical Garden, Florida

Scientific classification
- Kingdom: Plantae
- Clade: Tracheophytes
- Clade: Angiosperms
- Clade: Eudicots
- Clade: Rosids
- Order: Malvales
- Family: Malvaceae
- Subfamily: Bombacoideae
- Genus: Bernoullia; Oliv.

Species
- Bernoullia flammea Oliv.; Bernoullia jaliscana Miranda & McVaugh; Bernoullia uribeana Cuatrec.

Synonyms
- Bernullia Neck.

= Bernoullia =

Genus of flowering plants

Bernoullia is a genus of tropical trees in the mallow family, Malvaceae. It was established by English botanist Daniel Oliver in 1873. There are three accepted species, which occur from Mexico to Colombia.

- Bernoullia flammea Oliv.
- Bernoullia jaliscana Miranda & McVaugh
- Bernoullia uribeana Cuatrec.

Nuclear DNA studies suggest that Bernoullia and the genera Gyranthera and Huberodendron form a sister clade to a core Bombacoideae clade. Members of this genus have indehiscent fruits — that is, they do not split open when ripe to release their seeds. The staminal filaments of the flowers are fused into a tube, with the unstalked anthers located near the tube's apex. The pollen is somewhat triangular in shape, with furrows and/or pores on the surface.
