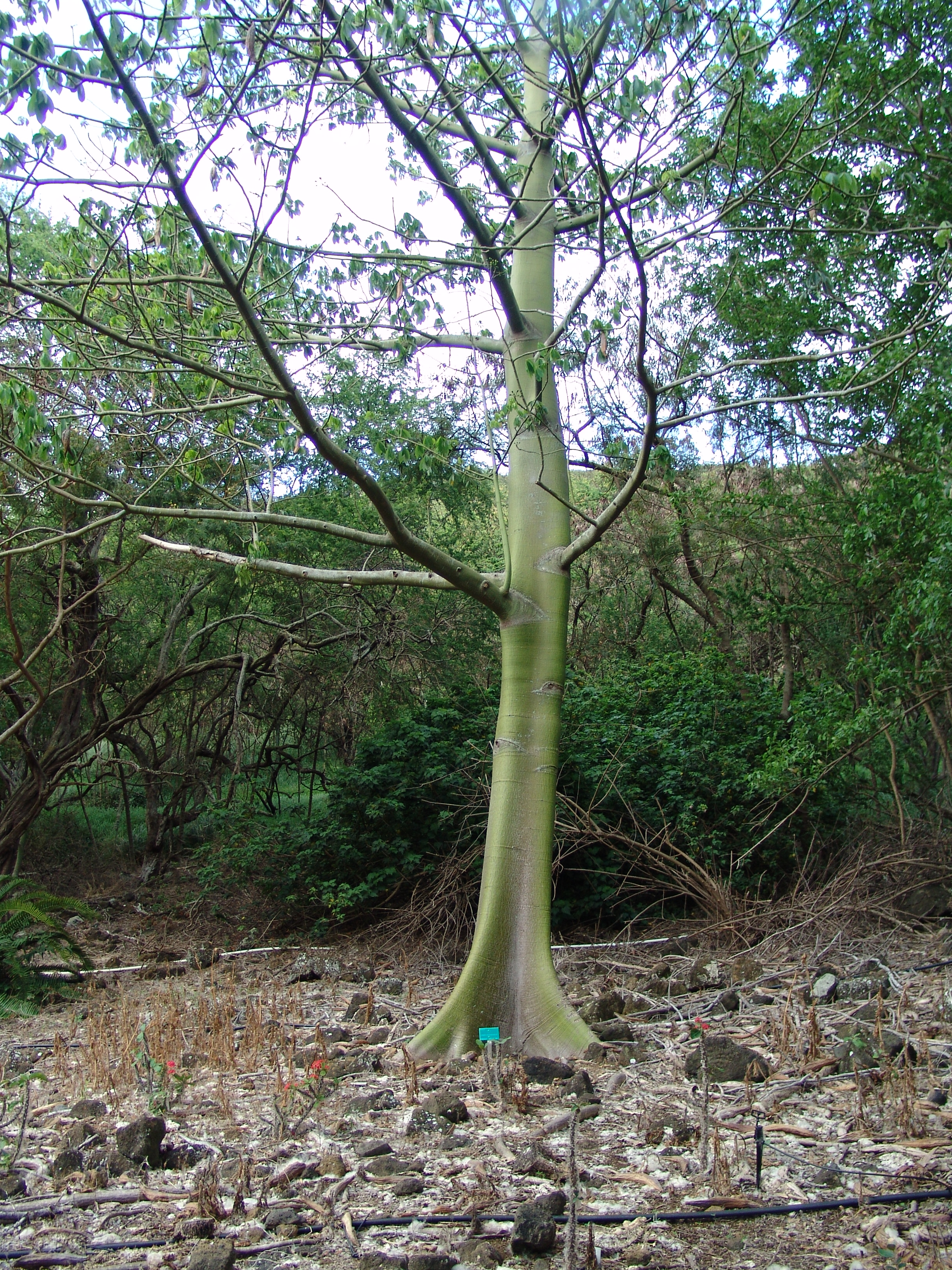
- Wild kapok tree

Conservation status
- Least Concern (IUCN 3.1)

Scientific classification
- Kingdom: Plantae
- Clade: Tracheophytes
- Clade: Angiosperms
- Clade: Eudicots
- Clade: Rosids
- Order: Malvales
- Family: Malvaceae
- Genus: Rhodognaphalon
- Species: R. mossambicense

Binomial name
- Rhodognaphalon mossambicense (A.Robyns) A.Robyns

Synonyms
- Bombax mossambicense A.Robyns; Bombax rhodognaphalon K.Schum.; Rhodognaphalon schumannianum A.Robyns; Rhodognaphalon tanganyikense A.Robyns

= Rhodognaphalon mossambicense =

Species of flowering plant

Rhodognaphalon mossambicense, the East African bombax or wild kapok tree, is a species of flowering plant in the family Malvaceae. It occurs from southeastern Kenya through the coastal and Eastern Arc forests of Tanzania to northern Mozambique and Malawi.

Its seeds are roasted and eaten, either whole or pounded into a powder which is then used in cooking.
