= Eriotheca peruviana =

Conservation status
- Vulnerable (IUCN 2.3)

Scientific classification
- Kingdom: Plantae
- Clade: Tracheophytes
- Clade: Angiosperms
- Clade: Eudicots
- Clade: Rosids
- Order: Malvales
- Family: Malvaceae
- Genus: Eriotheca
- Species: E. peruviana

Binomial name
- Eriotheca peruviana Robyns

Species of plant

Eriotheca peruviana is a species of flowering plant in the family Malvaceae. It is found only in Peru.
