= Pentaplaris huaoranica =

Conservation status
- Near Threatened (IUCN 3.1)

Scientific classification
- Kingdom: Plantae
- Clade: Tracheophytes
- Clade: Angiosperms
- Clade: Eudicots
- Clade: Rosids
- Order: Malvales
- Family: Malvaceae
- Genus: Pentaplaris
- Species: P. huaoranica

Binomial name
- Pentaplaris huaoranica Dorr & C.Bayer

Species of flowering plant

Pentaplaris huaoranica is a species of flowering plant in the family Malvaceae. It is found only in Ecuador. Its natural habitat is subtropical or tropical moist lowland forests.
