= Huberodendron patinoi =

Conservation status
- Vulnerable (IUCN 2.3)

Scientific classification
- Kingdom: Plantae
- Clade: Tracheophytes
- Clade: Angiosperms
- Clade: Eudicots
- Clade: Rosids
- Order: Malvales
- Family: Malvaceae
- Genus: Huberodendron
- Species: H. patinoi

Binomial name
- Huberodendron patinoi Cuatrec.

Species of flowering plant

Huberodendron patinoi is a species of flowering plant in the Malvaceae family. It is found in Colombia, Ecuador, and possibly Panama. It is threatened by habitat loss.
