= Rhodognaphalon brevicuspe =

Conservation status
- Vulnerable (IUCN 2.3)

Scientific classification
- Kingdom: Plantae
- Clade: Tracheophytes
- Clade: Angiosperms
- Clade: Eudicots
- Clade: Rosids
- Order: Malvales
- Family: Malvaceae
- Genus: Rhodognaphalon
- Species: R. breviscupe

Binomial name
- Rhodognaphalon breviscupe (Sprague) Roberty

Species of flowering plant

Rhodognaphalon brevicuspe is a species of flowering plant in the family Malvaceae. It is found in Cameroon, Republic of the Congo, Democratic Republic of the Congo, Ivory Coast, Gabon, Ghana, Nigeria, and Sierra Leone. It is threatened by habitat loss.
