= José Luis Fernández Alonso =

- Born: 1959 (age 65–66); Encinas de Esgueva- Province of Valladolid
- Citizenship: Spanish and Colombian by adoption
- Scientific career
- Fields: Botanist
- Author abbrev. (botany): Fern.Alonso

José Luis Fernández Alonso (born 1959) is a Spanish born Colombian botanist. He has published over 20 papers since 1987. The standard author abbreviation Fern.Alonso is used to indicate this person as the author when citing a botanical name.

== Biography ==
He was born in Encinas de Esgueva in the Province of Valladolid, Spain. He graduated in the field of Biology at the Universidad de Salamanca and worked at the Royal Botanical Garden of Madrid, under Santiago Castroviejo, finishing his graduate thesis "Florula of the north west of the Province of Valladolid" in 1985, and his doctoral thesis "Monograph of the neotropical genus Aragoa – Scrophulariaceae family" in 1993.

He came into contact with neotropical flora in the Royal Botanical Garden of Madrid through the historical herbaria of Mutis, Ruiz and Pavón e Isern (from Colombia, Peru, Chile and Ecuador), awaking his interest in the flora of this region and of the family Scrophulariaceae in particular.

He moved to Colombia en 1986 to work as an intern and in 1987-1990 as a Cooperating Botanist at the AECI, in the "Flora Project of the Royal Botanical Expedition of the New Kingdom of Granada", at the Institute of Natural Sciences at the National University of Colombia.

From 1991 to 2009, he was a professor and research officer at the Institute of Natural Sciences, Faculty of Science at the National University of Colombia in Bogotá, training new biologists in the field of vegetable taxonomy and Colombian flora.

At the Institute, he was curator of the National Colombian Herbary from 1996 to 2000 where he collaborated with other regional herbaries from other universities around the country, which contain many of his collections of vascular plants. In 2009 he became lead scientist at the CSIC at the Royal Botanical Garden of Madrid, to work on vegetable biodiversity in tropical areas.
