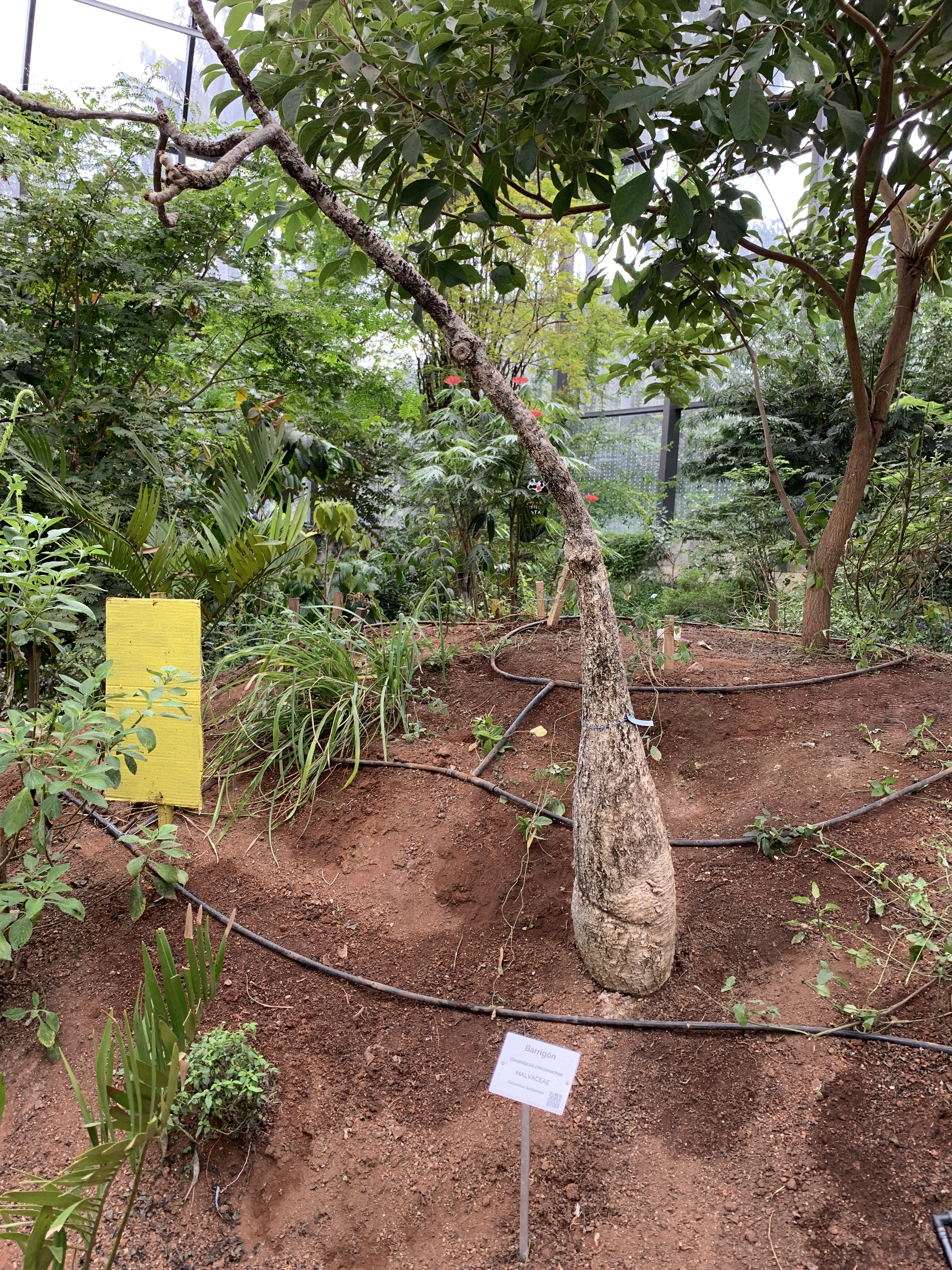

Conservation status
- Endangered (IUCN 3.1)

Scientific classification
- Kingdom: Plantae
- Clade: Tracheophytes
- Clade: Angiosperms
- Clade: Eudicots
- Clade: Rosids
- Order: Malvales
- Family: Malvaceae
- Genus: Cavanillesia
- Species: C. chicamochae

Binomial name
- Cavanillesia chicamochae Fern. Alonso, 2003

= Cavanillesia chicamochae =

Species of tree

Cavanillesia chicamochae, also known as Ceiba Barrigona, is a species of trees in the family Malvaceae. It is native to Colombia.
