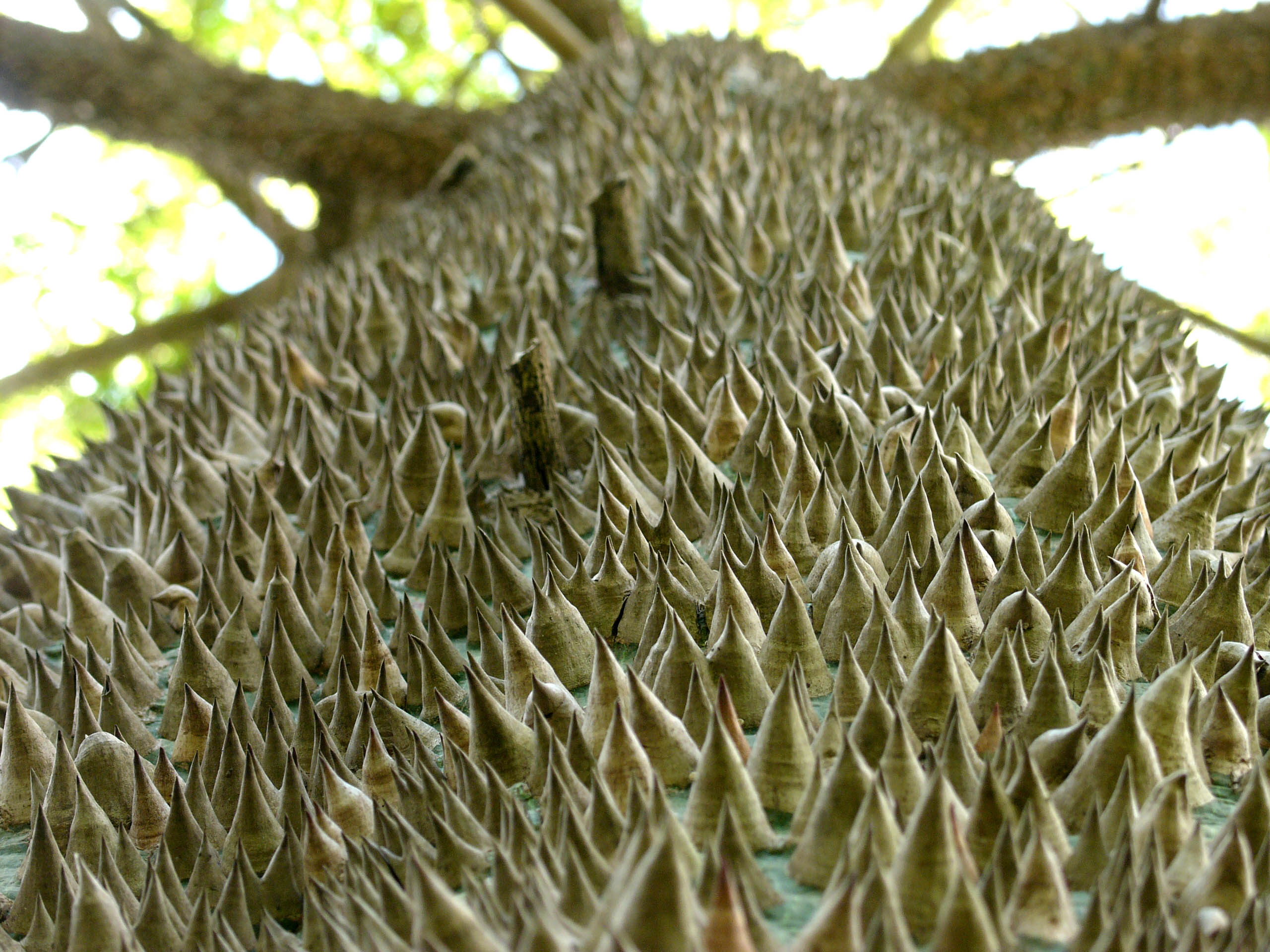
- Cortex of juvenile Ceiba pentandra

Scientific classification
- Kingdom: Plantae
- Clade: Tracheophytes
- Clade: Angiosperms
- Clade: Eudicots
- Clade: Rosids
- Order: Malvales
- Family: Malvaceae
- Subfamily: Bombacoideae; Burnett

= Bombacoideae =

Subfamily of flowering plants

Bombacoideae is a subfamily of the mallow family, Malvaceae. It contains herbaceous and woody plants. Their leaves are alternate, commonly palmately lobed, with small and caducous stipules. The flowers are hermaphroditic and actinomorphic; the calyx has 5 sepals united at the base, which are not accompanied by an epicalyx (involucel). The corolla has 5 free petals and an androecium of numerous stamens, typically with free filaments which are not fused in a staminal tube (column). The pollen is smooth and the ovary superior and pluricarpellate. The fruits are schizocarpous or capsular.

== Genera ==
- Adansonia L. - baobabs
- Aguiaria Ducke
- Bernoullia Oliv.
- Bombax L.
- Camptostemon Mast.
- Catostemma Benth.
- Cavanillesia Ruiz & Pav.
- Ceiba Mill.
- Chiranthodendron Larreat.
- Eriotheca Schott & Endl.
- Fremontodendron Coville
- Gyranthera Pittier
- Huberodendron Ducke
- Lagunaria (DC.) Rchb.
- Matisia Humb. & Bonpl.
- Neobuchia Urb.
- Ochroma Sw.
- Pachira Aubl.
- Patinoa Cuatrec.
- Pentaplaris L.O.Williams & Standl.
- Phragmotheca Cuatrec.
- Pseudobombax Dugand
- Quararibea Aubl.
- Rhodognaphalon (Ulbr.) Roberty
- Scleronema Benth.
- Septotheca Ulbr.
- Spirotheca Ulbr.
- Uladendron Marc.-Berti

== Classification ==
Some taxa in this subfamily were previously grouped under the now-obsolete family Bombacaceae, as recent phylogenetic research has shown that Bombacaceae as traditionally circumscribed (including tribe Durioneae) is not a monophyletic group. Camptostemon, Lagunaria, Pentaplaris and Uladendron might more appropriately be placed in Malvoideae, as might the tribe Matisieae (Matisia, Phragmotheca and Quararibea).
