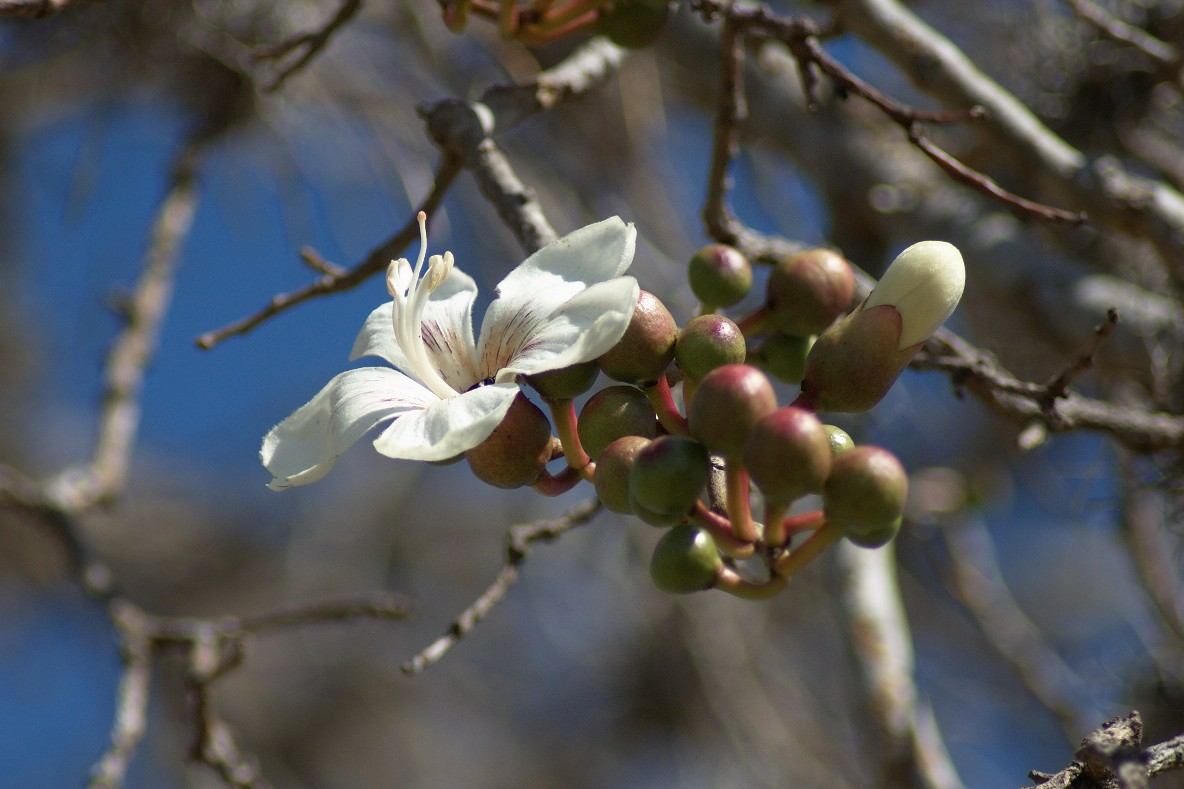

Conservation status
- Least Concern (IUCN 3.1)

Scientific classification
- Kingdom: Plantae
- Clade: Tracheophytes
- Clade: Angiosperms
- Clade: Eudicots
- Clade: Rosids
- Order: Malvales
- Family: Malvaceae
- Genus: Cavanillesia
- Species: C. umbellata

Binomial name
- Cavanillesia umbellata Ruiz & Pav.

Synonyms
- Cavanillesia cordata Spreng.

= Cavanillesia umbellata =

Species of tree

Cavanillesia umbellata is a species of trees in the family Malvaceae. It is native to South America.
