= Cavanillesia hylogeiton =

Scientific classification
- Kingdom: Plantae
- Clade: Tracheophytes
- Clade: Angiosperms
- Clade: Eudicots
- Clade: Rosids
- Order: Malvales
- Family: Malvaceae
- Genus: Cavanillesia
- Species: C. hylogeiton

Binomial name
- Cavanillesia hylogeiton Ulbr.

Species of tree

Cavanillesia hylogeiton is a species of trees in the family Malvaceae. It is native to South America.
