= Spirotheca rosea =

Conservation status
- Least Concern (IUCN 3.1)

Scientific classification
- Kingdom: Plantae
- Clade: Tracheophytes
- Clade: Angiosperms
- Clade: Eudicots
- Clade: Rosids
- Order: Malvales
- Family: Malvaceae
- Genus: Spirotheca
- Species: S. rosea

Binomial name
- Spirotheca rosea (Seem.) P.E. Gibbs & W.S. Alverson

Synonyms
- Ceiba rosea (Seem.) K.Schum.; Chorisia rosea Seem.; Spirotheca allenii (Woodson) Cuatrec.; Spirotheca codazziana Romero; Spirotheca rhodostyla Cuatrec.; Spirotheca rimbachii Cuatrec.; Spirotheca salmonea Ulbr.; Spirotheca trilobata Romero

Species of tree

Spirotheca rosea is a species of tree in the family Malvaceae. It is found from Costa Rica to Bolivia. It is threatened by habitat loss.
