= Pentaplaris =

Scientific classification
- Kingdom: Plantae
- Clade: Tracheophytes
- Clade: Angiosperms
- Clade: Eudicots
- Clade: Rosids
- Order: Malvales
- Family: Malvaceae
- Subfamily: Bombacoideae
- Genus: Pentaplaris; L.O.Williams & Standl.

Genus of flowering plants

Pentaplaris is a genus of flowering plants in the family Malvaceae. It includes three species native to Costa Rica and western South America (Colombia, Ecuador, Peru, and Bolivia).

Three species are accepted:

- Pentaplaris davidsmithii Dorr & C.Bayer
- Pentaplaris doroteae L.O.Williams & Standl.
- Pentaplaris huaoranica Dorr & C.Bayer
