= Encinas de Esgueva =

Coordinates: 41°45′N 4°06′W

Encinas de Esgueva, Spain
- Coat of arms

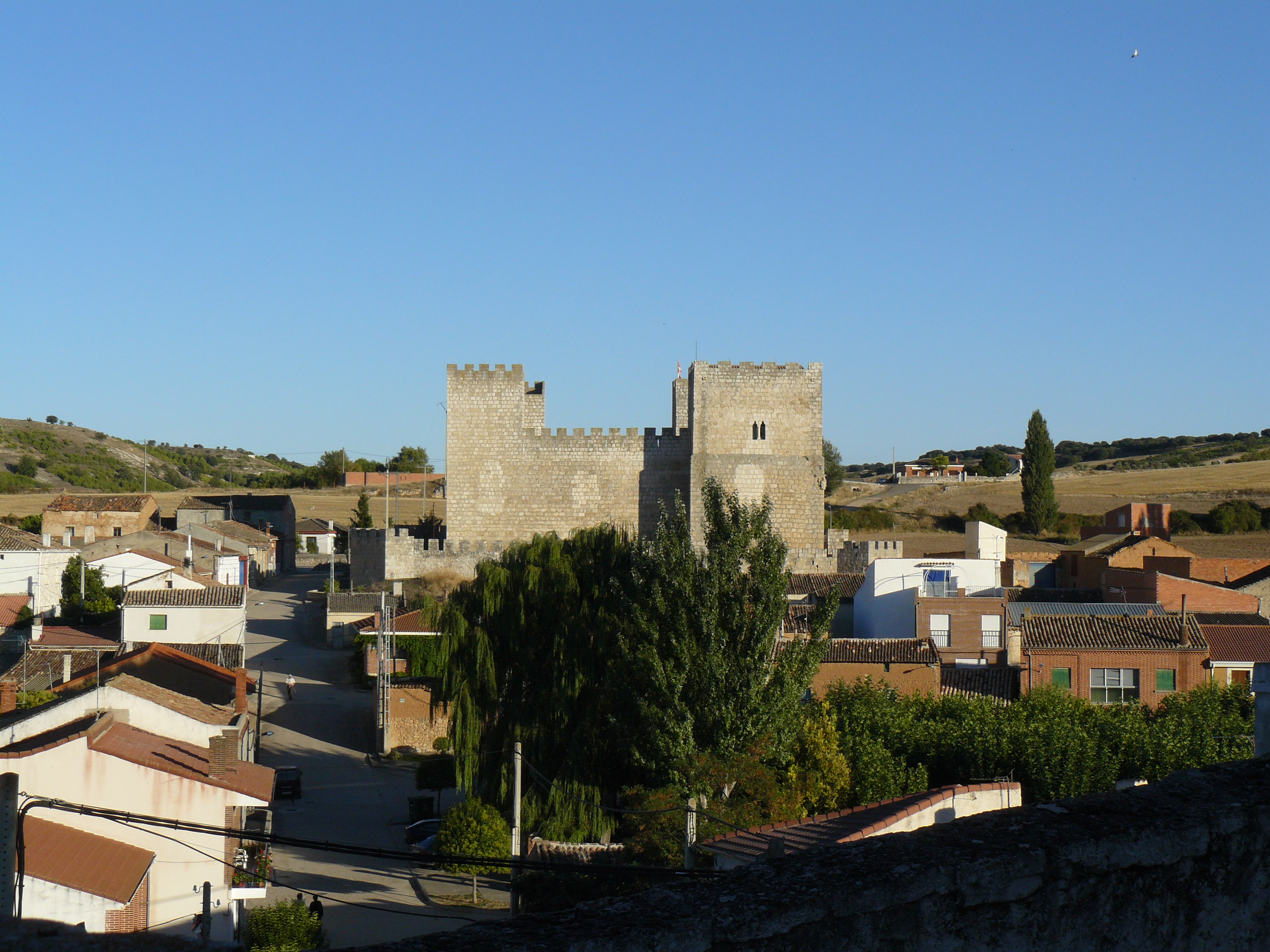
- Castle in town.
- Country: Spain
- Autonomous community: Castile and León
- Province: Valladolid
- Municipality: Encinas de Esgueva

Area
  - Total: 31 km^{2} (12 sq mi)
- Elevation: 828 m (2,717 ft)

Population (2025-01-01)
  - Total: 214
  - Density: 6.9/km^{2} (18/sq mi)
- Time zone: UTC+1 (CET)
  - Summer (DST): UTC+2 (CEST)

Encinas de Esgueva is a municipality located in the province of Valladolid, Castile and León, Spain. According to the 2004 census (INE), the municipality has a population of 340 inhabitants.
