= Septotheca =

Scientific classification
- Kingdom: Plantae
- Clade: Tracheophytes
- Clade: Angiosperms
- Clade: Eudicots
- Clade: Rosids
- Order: Malvales
- Family: Malvaceae
- Subfamily: Bombacoideae
- Genus: Septotheca; Ulbr.
- Species: S. tessmannii

Binomial name
- Septotheca tessmannii Ulbr.

Genus of trees

Septotheca is a genus of trees in the family Malvaceae. It contains a single species Septotheca tessmannii, native to Peru, Colombia and Brazil.
