= Scleronema (plant) =

Scientific classification
- Kingdom: Plantae
- Clade: Tracheophytes
- Clade: Angiosperms
- Clade: Eudicots
- Clade: Rosids
- Order: Malvales
- Family: Malvaceae
- Subfamily: Bombacoideae
- Genus: Scleronema; Benth.

Species
- Scleronema grandiflorum Huber; Scleronema guianense Sandwith; Scleronema micranthum (Ducke) Ducke; Scleronema praecox (Ducke) Ducke; Scleronema spruceanum Benth.

Genus of flowering plants

Scleronema is a genus of South American flowering plants in the family Malvaceae. It includes five species native to tropical South America, ranging from Peru and Colombia to Venezuela, Guyana, and northern Brazil.
