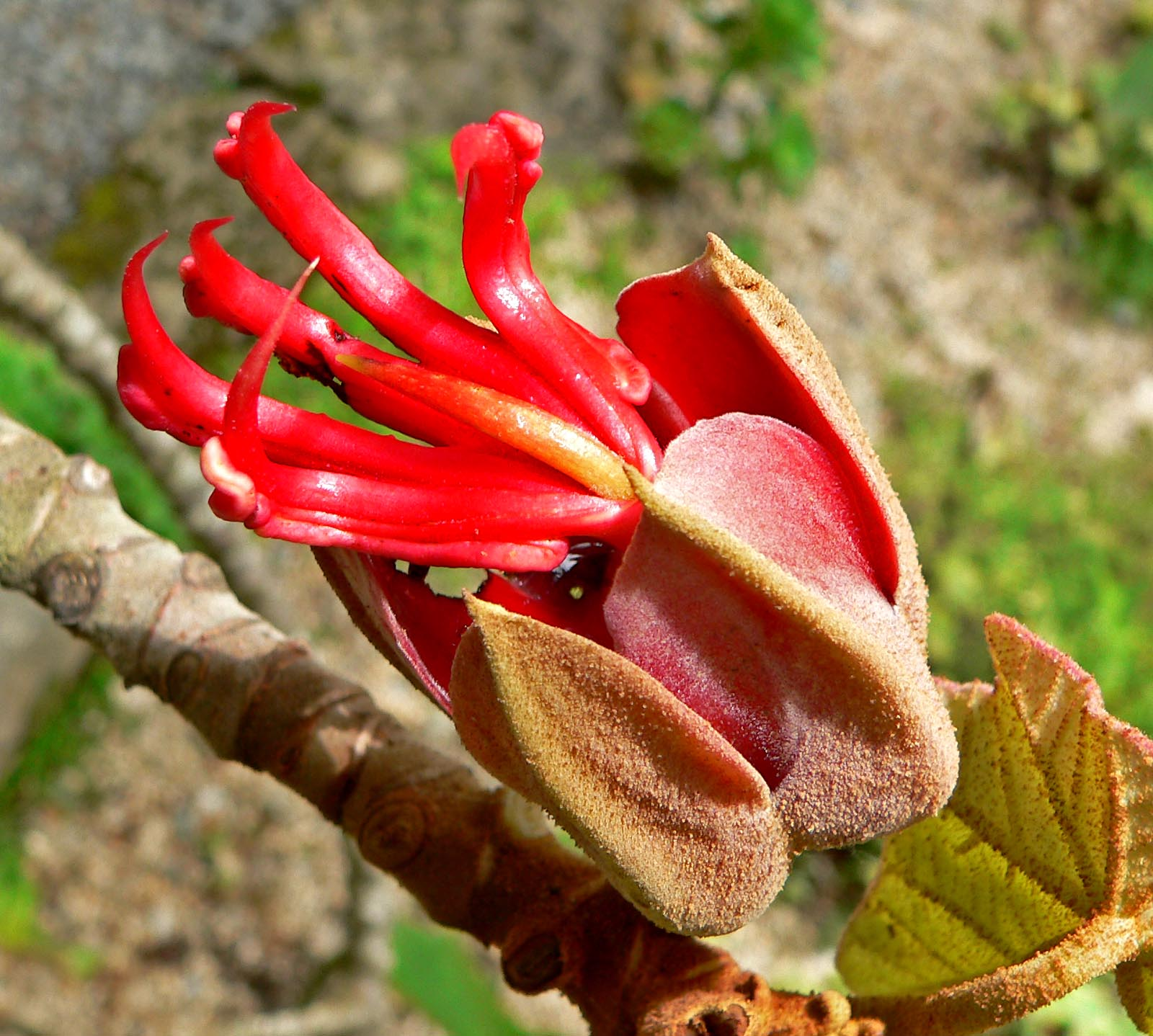

Scientific classification
- Kingdom: Plantae
- Clade: Tracheophytes
- Clade: Angiosperms
- Clade: Eudicots
- Clade: Rosids
- Order: Malvales
- Family: Malvaceae
- Subfamily: Bombacoideae
- Genus: Chiranthodendron; Larreat.
- Species: C. pentadactylon

Binomial name
- Chiranthodendron pentadactylon Larreat.

= Chiranthodendron =

Genus of trees

Chiranthodendron is a flowering plant genus in the family Malvaceae. It comprises a single species of tree, Chiranthodendron pentadactylon.

== Names ==
The tree is called the devil's, monkey's or Mexican hand tree or the hand-flower in English, the árbol de las manitas (tree of little hands) in Spanish, Canak in Mayan and mācpalxōchitl (palm flower) in Nahuatl, all on account of its distinctive red flowers, which resemble open human hands. The scientific name means "five-fingered hand-flower tree".

== Description ==
This species is native to Guatemala and southern Mexico. On the wet slopes of these areas, trees may reach 10.5–27.5 m (34–90 ft) in height. The unusual appearance of the 'hands' has stimulated cultivation in gardens around the world, primarily in North America where it grows well near its native range. The leaves are large and shallowly lobed, with a brown indumentum on the underside. The distinctive flowers appear in late spring and early summer; the five stamens are long, curved upward, and bright red, giving the distinct impression of a clawed hand. Its fruit is a 7.5–10 cm (3.0–3.9 in) long oblong, five-lobed capsule which contains black seeds.

It was originally described from a single cultivated specimen grown in Toluca in the Toluca Valley, well outside the native range. The Mayans revered the tree.

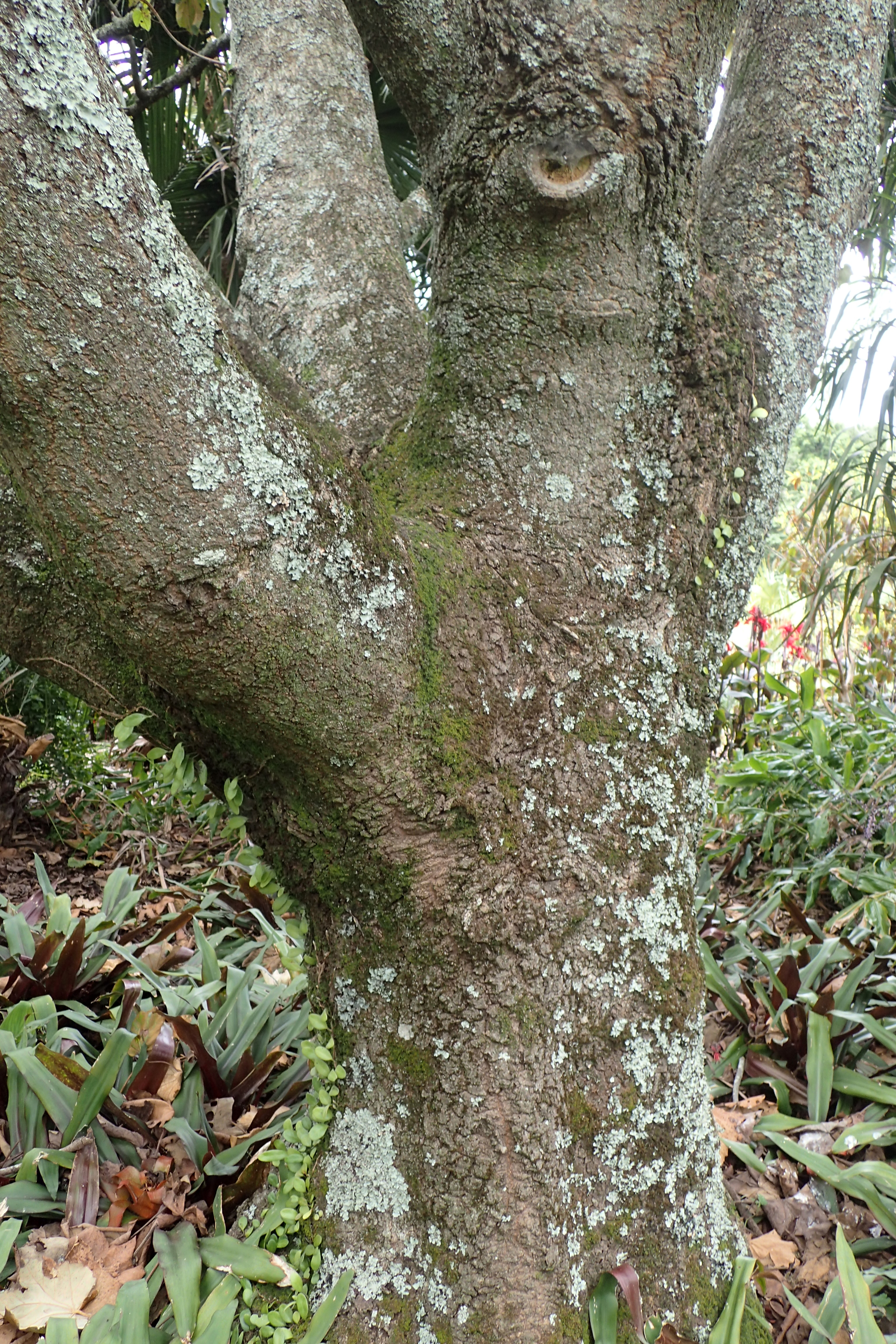
Bark

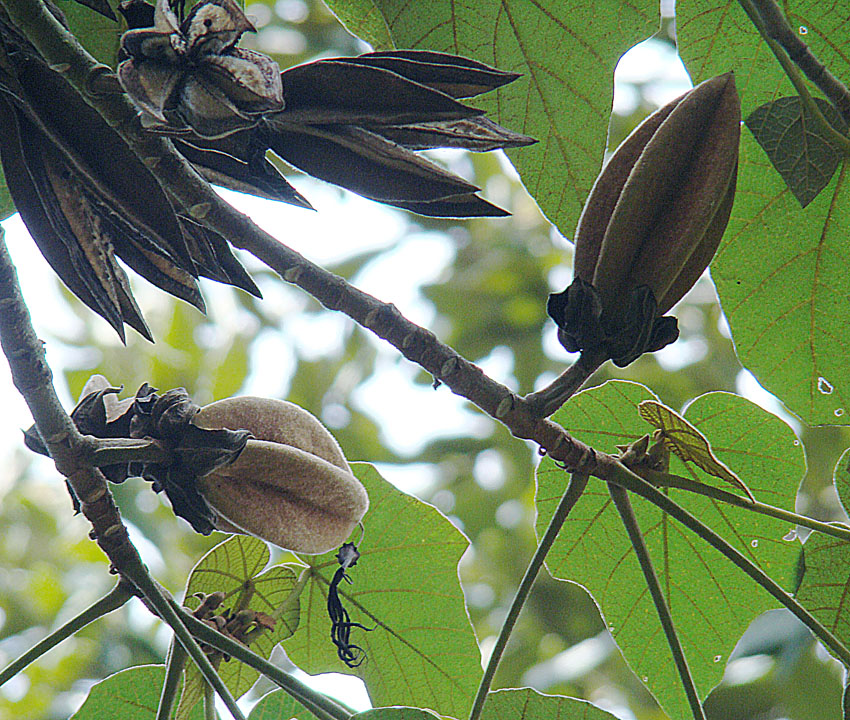
Pods

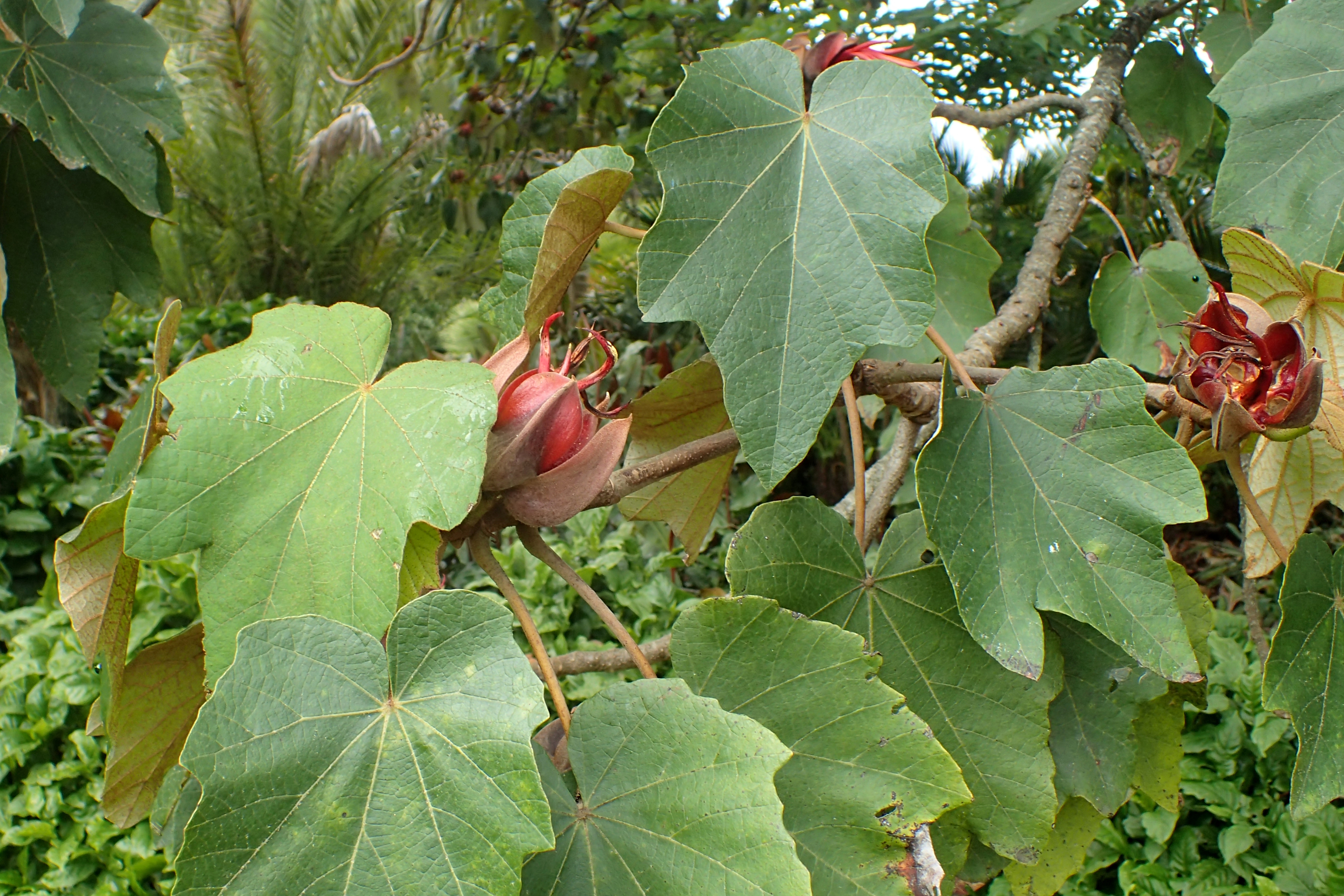
Leaves

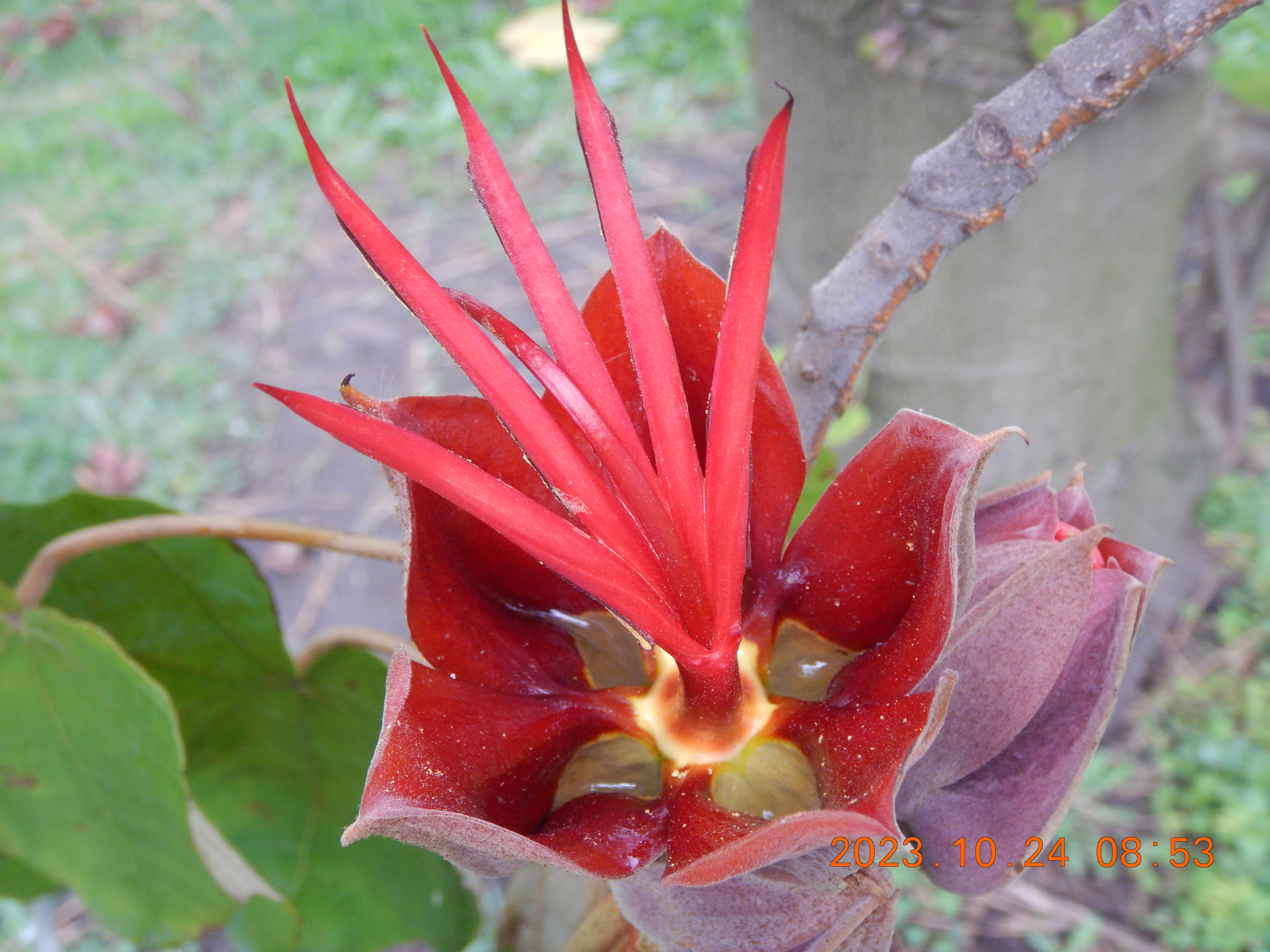
Open Chiranthodendron pentadactylon flower showing nectary and abundant nectar.

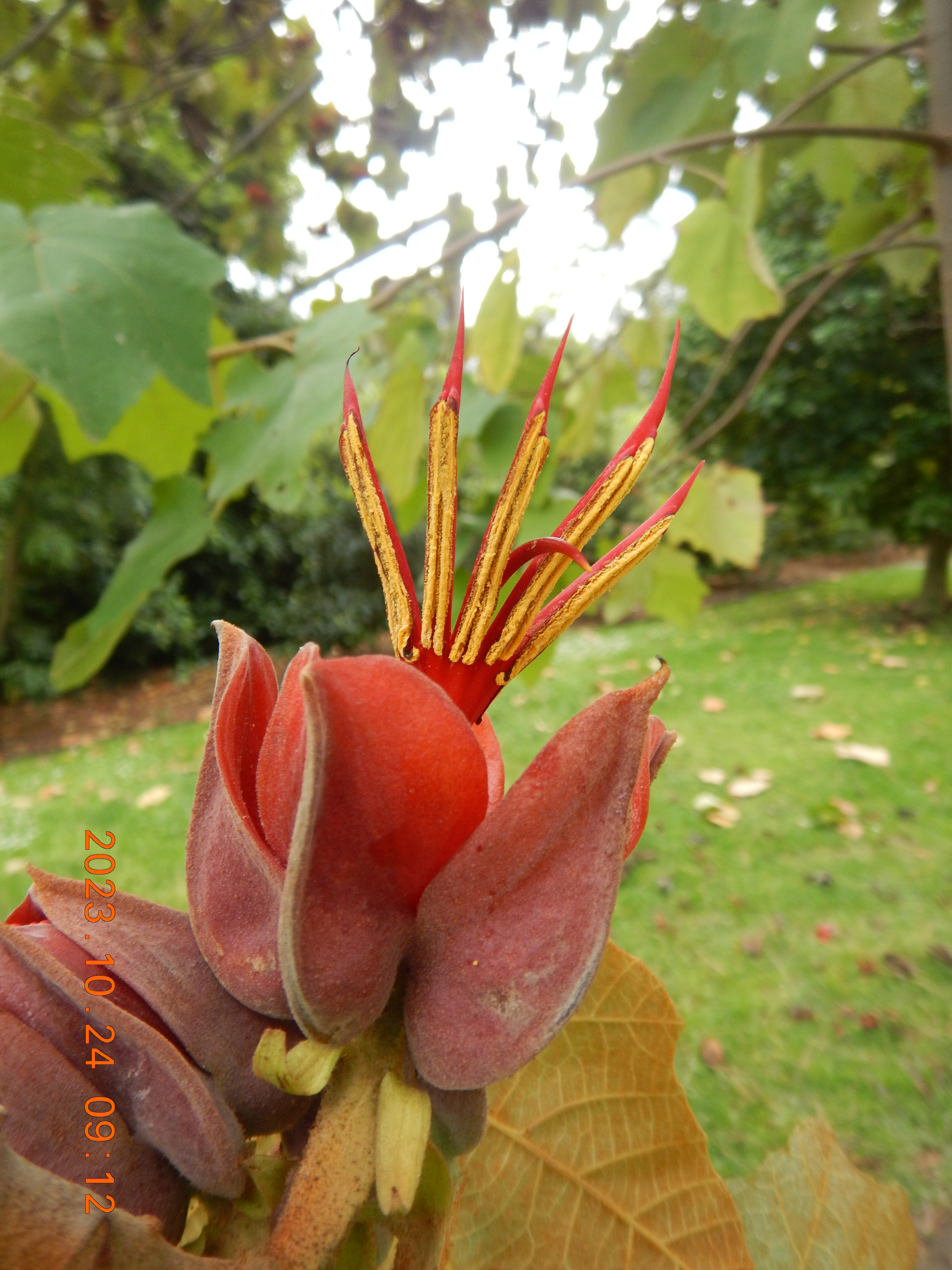
Chiranthodendron pentadactylon flower showing yellow pollen covered stamens.

=== Intergeneric hybrid ===
It is closely related to Fremontodendron, sufficiently to produce an intergeneric hybrid ×Chiranthofremontia lenzii Henrickson, which has yellow flowers and a reduced form of the claw.

== Uses ==
The Mayans and other Central American communities have used solutions containing the tree's flowers as a remedy for lower abdominal pain and for heart problems. Such solutions also reduce edema and serum cholesterol levels and, because they contain the glycosides quercetin and luteolin, act as diuretics. In Central America and part of Southern Mexico, the flower is extracted in hot water and taken as tea for these medical purposes. It can also be used externally as a wash.
