= Catostemma =

Scientific classification
- Kingdom: Plantae
- Clade: Embryophytes
- Clade: Tracheophytes
- Clade: Spermatophytes
- Clade: Angiosperms
- Clade: Eudicots
- Clade: Rosids
- Order: Malvales
- Family: Malvaceae
- Subfamily: Bombacoideae
- Genus: Catostemma; Benth.

Synonyms
- Guenetia Sagot ex Benoist

Genus of flowering plants

Catostemma is a genus of flowering plants belonging to the family Malvaceae.

Its native range is tropical South America, from Ecuador and Colombia to Venezuela, the Guianas, and northern Brazil.

== Species ==
16 species are accepted.

- Catostemma albuquerquei Paula
- Catostemma altsonii Sandwith
- Catostemma cavalcantei Paula
- Catostemma commune Sandwith
- Catostemma digitata J.D.Sheph. & W.S.Alverson
- Catostemma durifolius W.S.Alverson
- Catostemma ebracteolatum Steyerm.
- Catostemma fragrans Benth.
- Catostemma grazielae Paula
- Catostemma hirsutulum Steyerm.
- Catostemma lanceolatum C.D.M.Ferreira & W.S.Alverson
- Catostemma lemense Sanoja
- Catostemma marahuacense Steyerm.
- Catostemma milanezii Paula
- Catostemma sancarlosianum Steyerm.
- Catostemma sclerophyllum Ducke
