= Phragmotheca =

Scientific classification
- Kingdom: Plantae
- Clade: Tracheophytes
- Clade: Angiosperms
- Clade: Eudicots
- Clade: Rosids
- Order: Malvales
- Family: Malvaceae
- Subfamily: Bombacoideae
- Genus: Phragmotheca; Cuatrec.

Genus of flowering plants

Phragmotheca is a genus of flowering plants in the family Malvaceae. It includes 11 species native to Panama and western South America (Colombia, Ecuador, and Peru).

== Species ==
11 species are accepted.

- Phragmotheca amazonica (W.S.Alverson) Fern.Alonso
- Phragmotheca ecuadorensis W.S.Alverson
- Phragmotheca fuchsii Cuatrec.
- Phragmotheca hydra Fern.Alonso
- Phragmotheca lemniscata Fern.Alonso
- Phragmotheca leucoflora D.R.Simpson
- Phragmotheca mambitana Fern.Alonso & R.Jaram.
- Phragmotheca mammosa W.S.Alverson
- Phragmotheca rubriflora Fern.Alonso
- Phragmotheca sidereotricha Fern.Alonso
- Phragmotheca siderosa Cuatrec.
