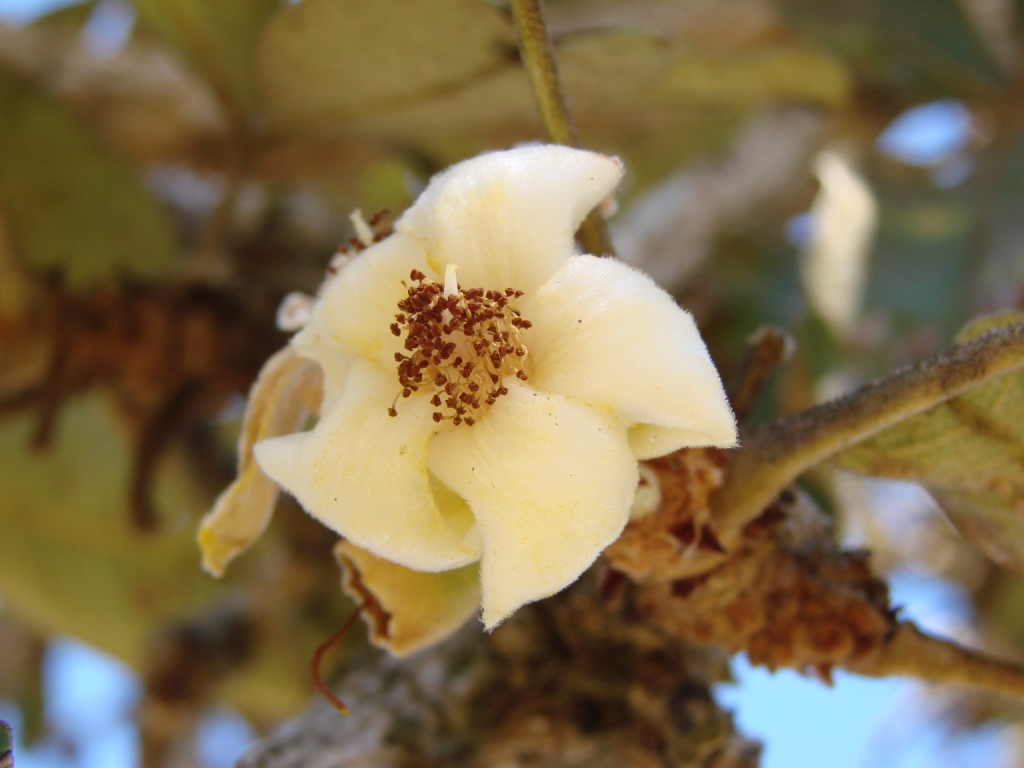
- Eriotheca pubescens

Scientific classification
- Kingdom: Plantae
- Clade: Embryophytes
- Clade: Tracheophytes
- Clade: Spermatophytes
- Clade: Angiosperms
- Clade: Eudicots
- Clade: Rosids
- Order: Malvales
- Family: Malvaceae
- Subfamily: Bombacoideae
- Genus: Eriotheca; Schott & Endl.

Species
- 34, see text

Synonyms
- Millea Standl.; Tartagalia Capurro

= Eriotheca =

Genus of flowering plants

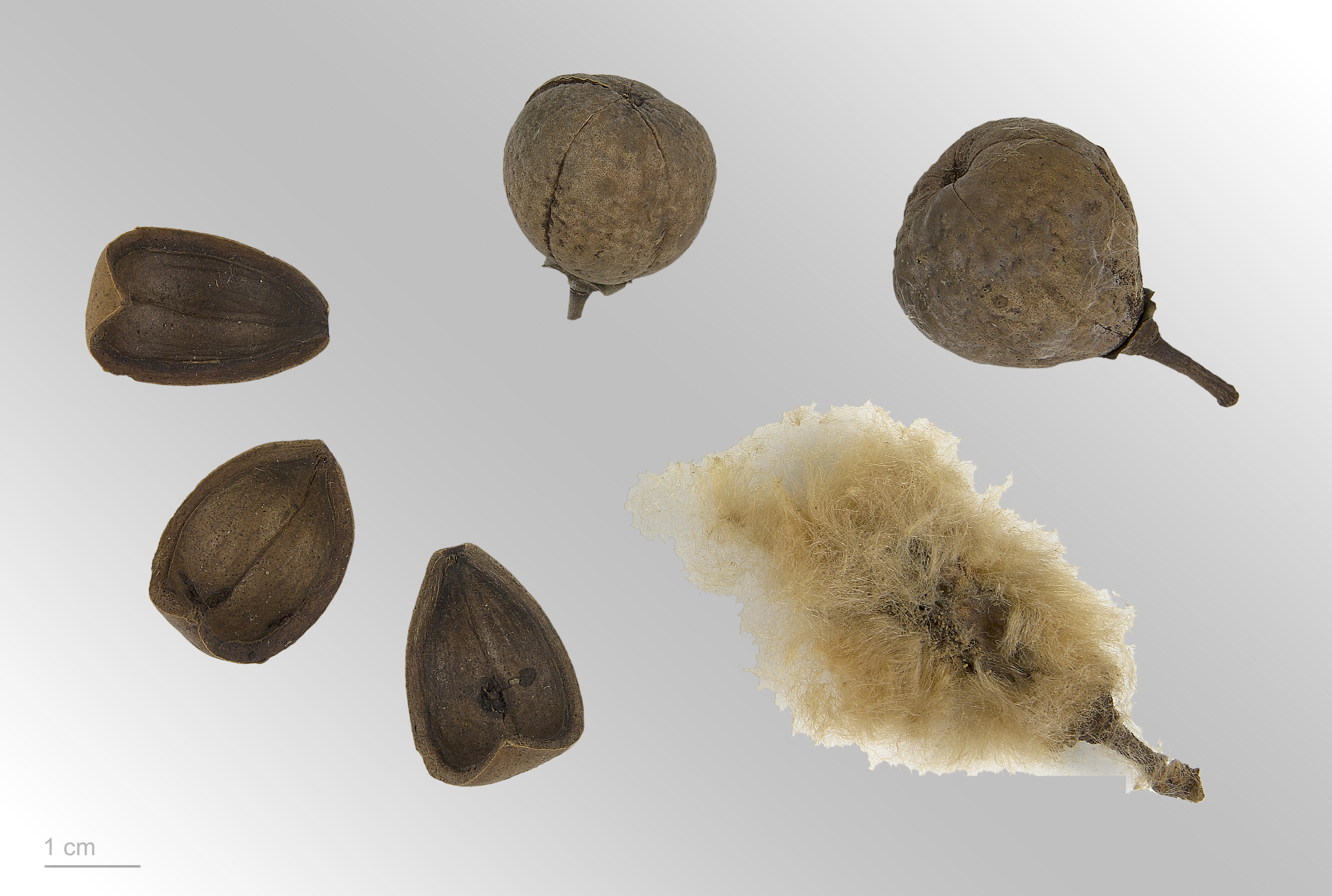
Eriotheca globosa - MHNT

Eriotheca is a genus of flowering plant in the family Malvaceae, native to tropical South America.

== Species ==
34 species are accepted.

- Eriotheca alversonii Carv.-Sobr. & Dorr
- Eriotheca bahiensis M.C.Duarte & G.L.Esteves
- Eriotheca bracteolata T.M.Macedo & M.C.Duarte
- Eriotheca candolleana (K.Schum.) A.Robyns
- Eriotheca crassa (Uittien) A.Robyns
- Eriotheca crenulata (K.Schum.) V.N.Yoshik. & M.C.Duarte
- Eriotheca crenulaticalyx A.Robyns
- Eriotheca discolor (Kunth) A.Robyns
- Eriotheca dolichopoda A.Robyns
- Eriotheca estevesiae Carv.-Sobr.
- Eriotheca globosa (Aubl.) A.Robyns
- Eriotheca gracilipes (K.Schum.) A.Robyns
- Eriotheca hassleri A.Robyns
- Eriotheca longipedicellata (Ducke) A.Robyns
- Eriotheca longipes (A.Robyns) M.C.Duarte & G.L.Esteves
- Eriotheca longitubulosa A.Robyns
- Eriotheca loretensis Fern.Alonso
- Eriotheca luzensis V.N.Yoshik. & M.C.Duarte
- Eriotheca macrophylla (K.Schum.) A.Robyns
- Eriotheca obcordata A.Robyns & S.Nilsson
- Eriotheca paganuccii Carv.-Sobr., A.C.Mota & Dorr
- Eriotheca peruviana A.Robyns
- Eriotheca pentaphylla (Vell.) A.Robyns
- Eriotheca pubescens (Mart. & Zucc.) Schott & Endl.
- Eriotheca platyandra A.Robyns
- Eriotheca pubescens (Mart. & Zucc.) Schott & Endl.
- Eriotheca roseorum (Cuatrec.) A.Robyns
- Eriotheca ruizii (K.Schum.) A.Robyns
- Eriotheca saxicola Carv.-Sobr.
- Eriotheca sclerophylla (Ducke) M.C.Duarte & G.L.Esteves
- Eriotheca squamigera (Cuatrec.) Fern.Alonso
- Eriotheca surinamensis (Uittien) A.Robyns
- Eriotheca uniflora V.N.Yoshik. & M.C.Duarte
- Eriotheca vargasii (Cuatrec.) A.Robyns
