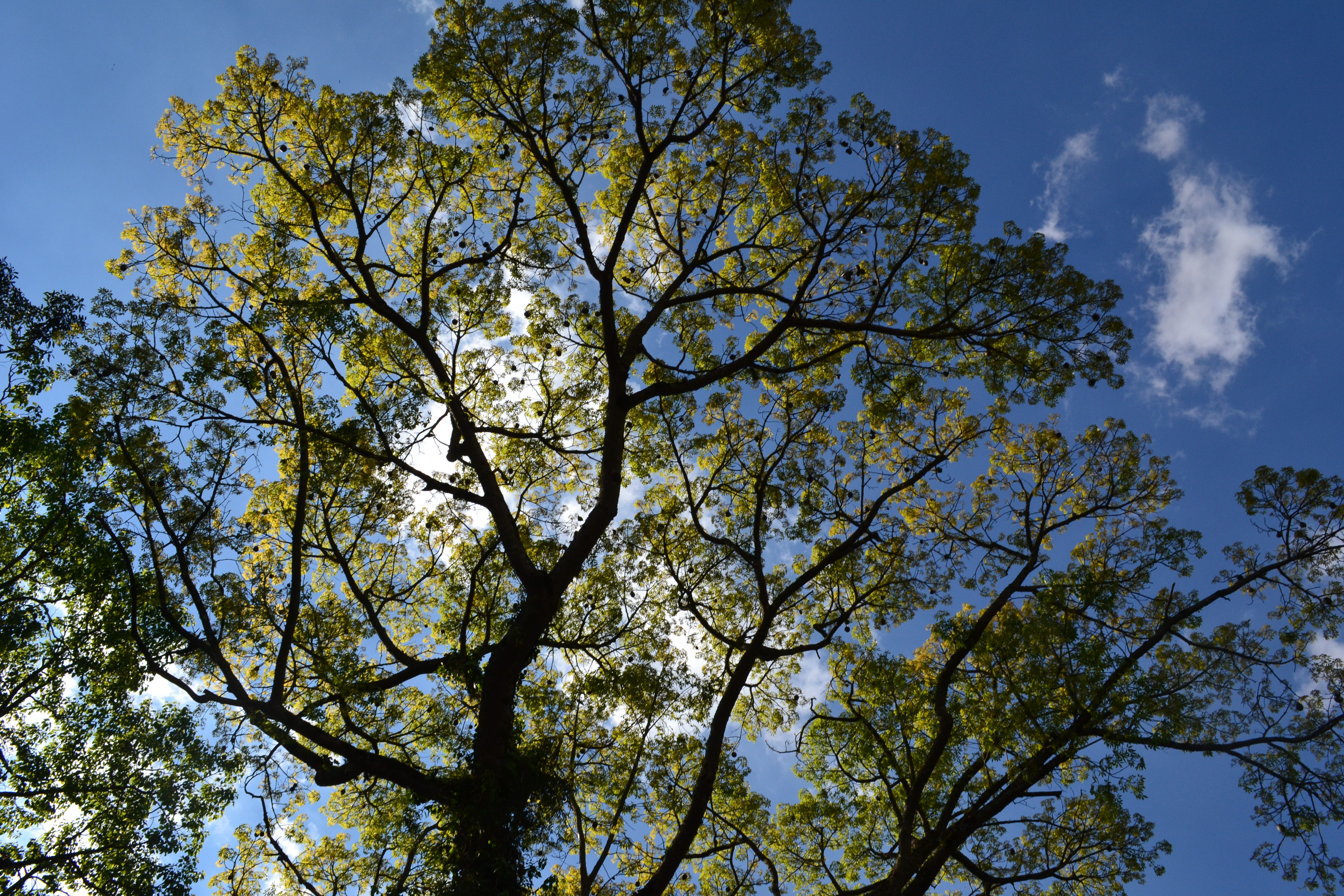
- Spirotheca rivieri

Scientific classification
- Kingdom: Plantae
- Clade: Tracheophytes
- Clade: Angiosperms
- Clade: Eudicots
- Clade: Rosids
- Order: Malvales
- Family: Malvaceae
- Subfamily: Bombacoideae
- Genus: Spirotheca; Ulbr.

Species
- 8, see text

= Spirotheca =

Genus of trees

Spirotheca is a genus of trees in the family Malvaceae, native to Central and South America.

== Species ==
Eight species are accepted.

- Spirotheca awadendron Fern.Alonso
- Spirotheca codazziana Romero
- Spirotheca elegans Carv.-Sobr., M.Machado & L.P.Queiroz
- Spirotheca mahechae Fern.Alonso
- Spirotheca mahechae Fern.Alonso
- Spirotheca michaeli Cuatrec.
- Spirotheca rhodostyla Cuatrec.
- Spirotheca rivieri (Decne.) Ulbr.
- Spirotheca rosea (Seem.) P.E.Gibbs & W.S.Alverson
