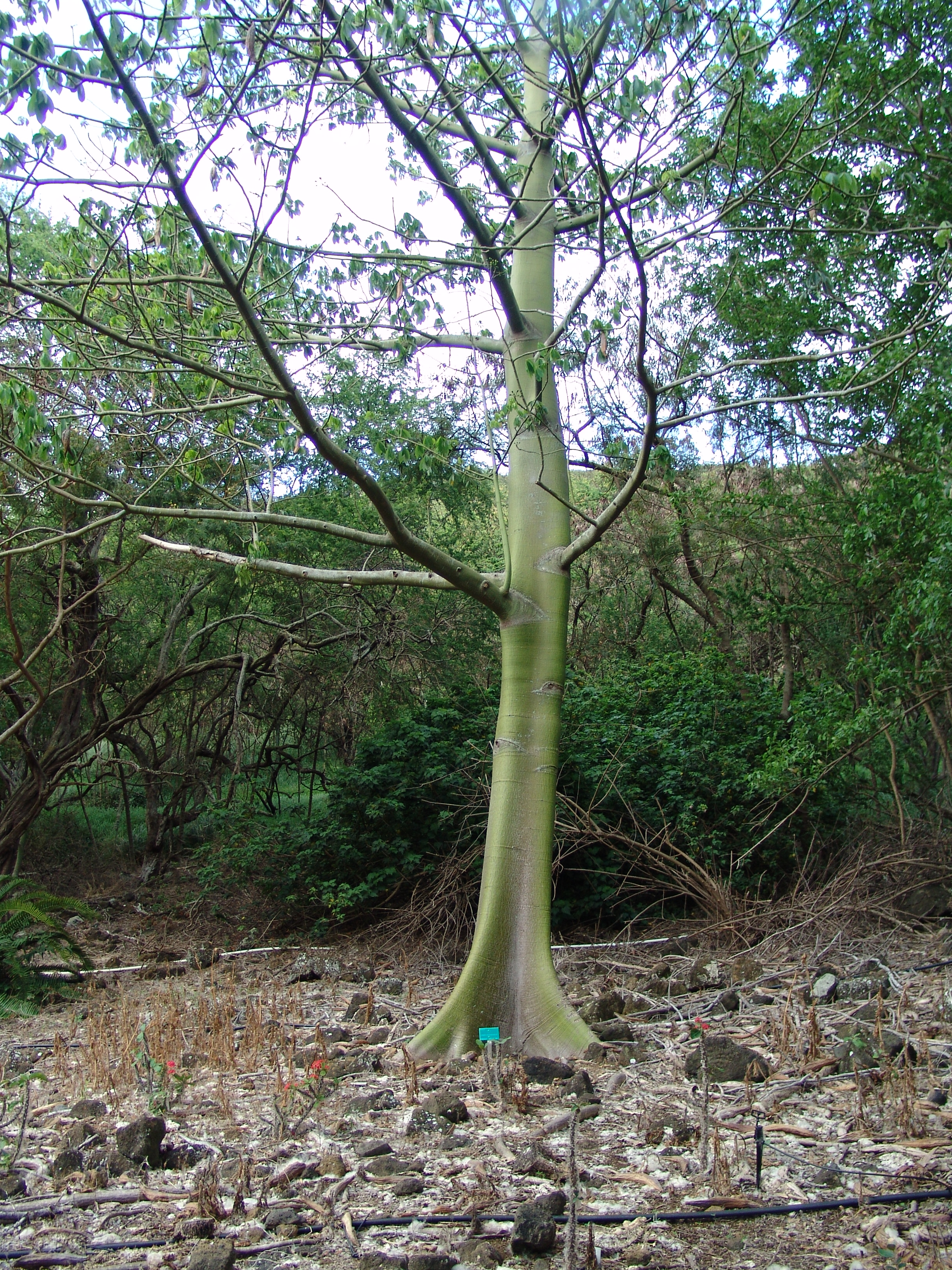
- Wild kapok tree, Rhodognaphalon mossambicense

Scientific classification
- Kingdom: Plantae
- Clade: Tracheophytes
- Clade: Angiosperms
- Clade: Eudicots
- Clade: Rosids
- Order: Malvales
- Family: Malvaceae
- Subfamily: Bombacoideae
- Genus: Rhodognaphalon (Ulbr.) Roberty

Type species
- Rhodognaphalon brevicuspe

Synonyms
- Bombax subg. Rhodognaphalon

= Rhodognaphalon =

Genus of flowering plants

Rhodognaphalon is a genus of flowering plant in the family Malvaceae native to western, central, and eastern tropical Africa.

== Species ==
Plants of the World Online currently includes:

- Rhodognaphalon brevicuspe (Sprague) Roberty - type species
- Rhodognaphalon lukayense (De Wild. & T.Durand) A.Robyns
- Rhodognaphalon mossambicense (A.Robyns) A.Robyns (synonym Rhodognaphalon schumannianum)
- Rhodognaphalon stolzii (Ulbr.) A.Robyns
