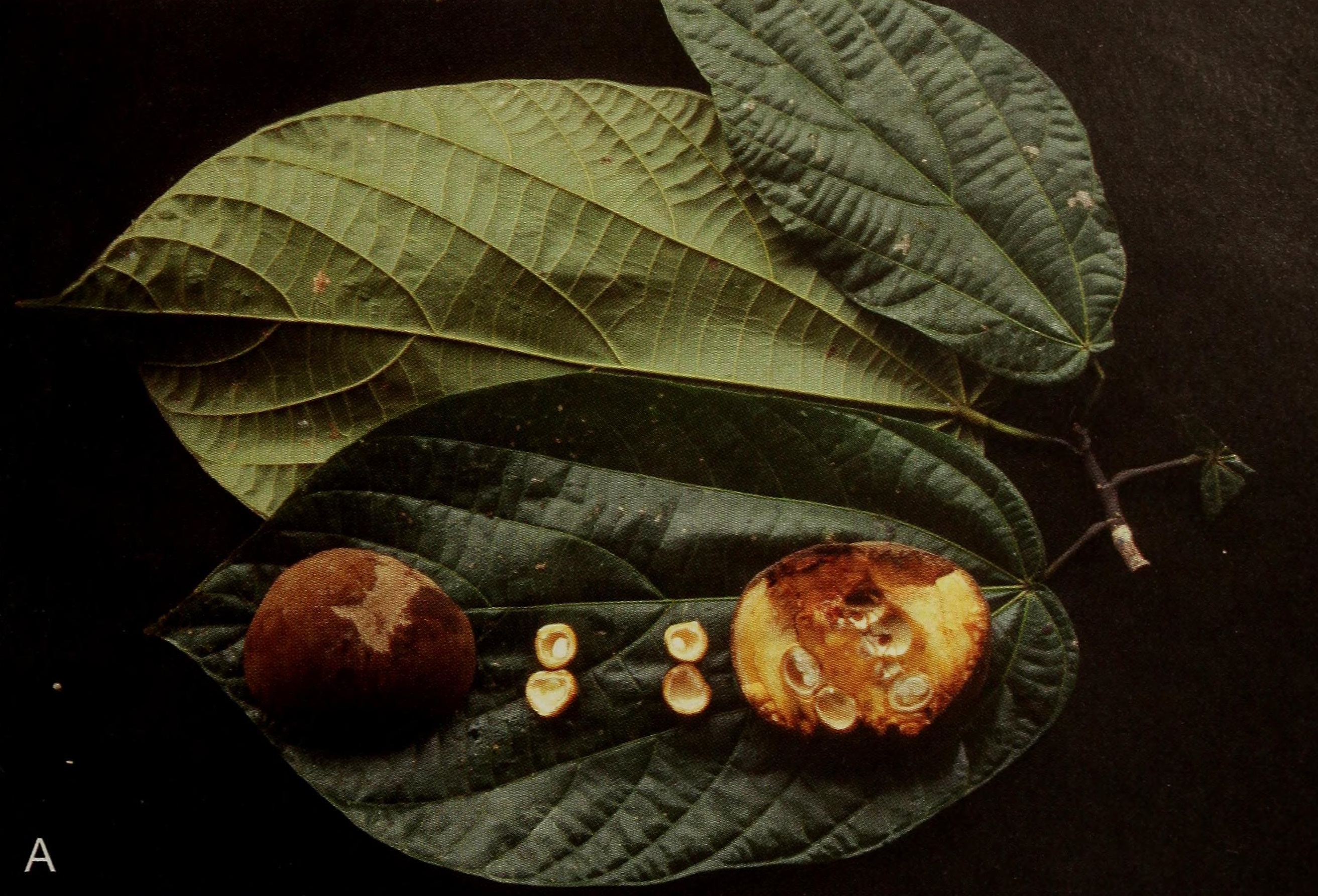
- Patinoa almirajo

Scientific classification
- Kingdom: Plantae
- Clade: Tracheophytes
- Clade: Angiosperms
- Clade: Eudicots
- Clade: Rosids
- Order: Malvales
- Family: Malvaceae
- Subfamily: Bombacoideae
- Genus: Patinoa; Cuatrec.

Species
- 4 species, see text

= Patinoa =

Genus of trees

Patinoa is a genus of trees in the family Malvaceae, native to Panama and South America.

== Species ==
Four species are accepted.

- Patinoa almirajo Cuatrec.
- Patinoa ichthyotoxica R.E.Schult. & Cuatrec.
- Patinoa paraensis (Huber) Cuatrec.
- Patinoa sphaerocarpa Cuatrec.
