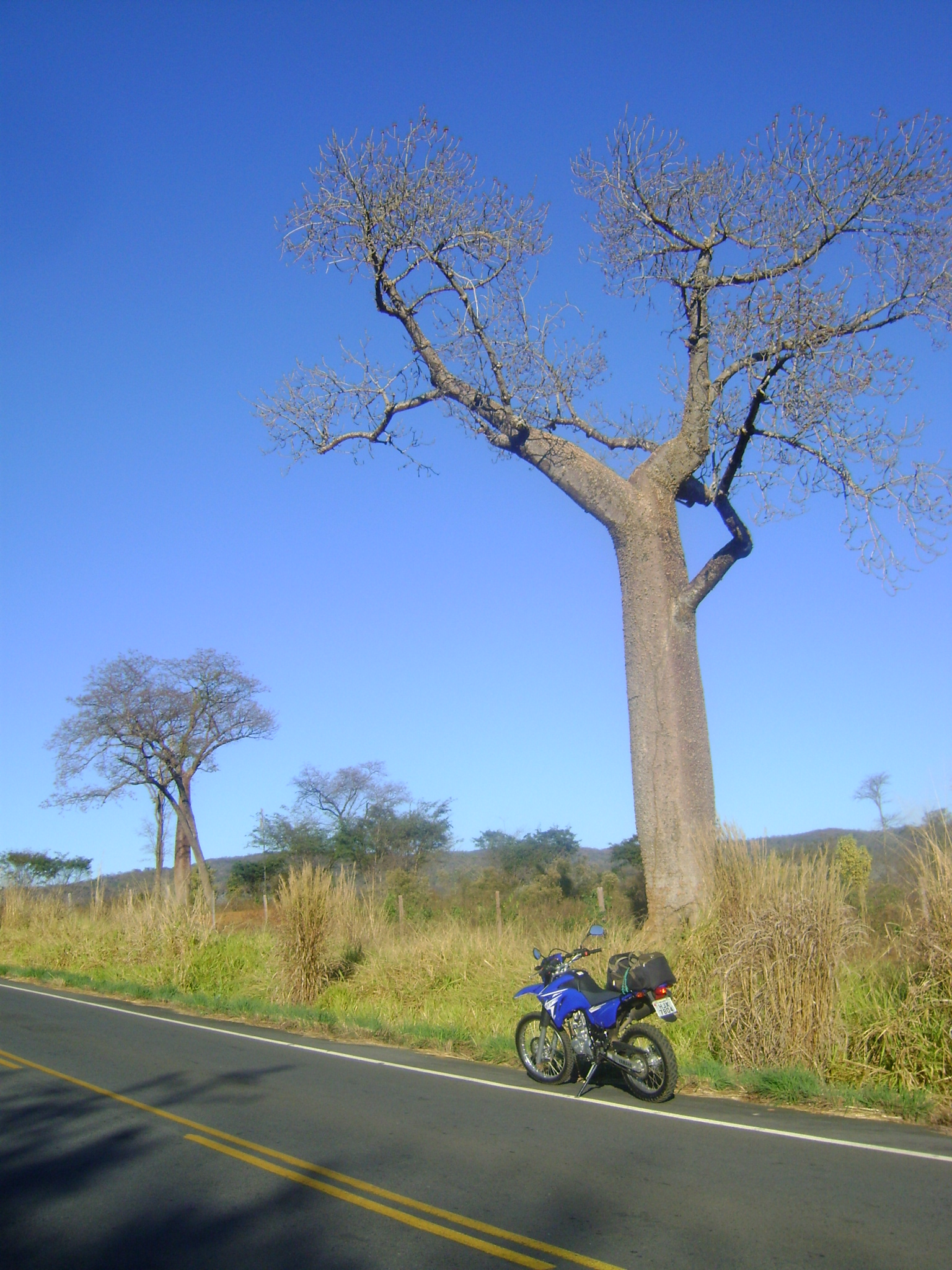
- Cavanillesia arborea trees

Scientific classification
- Kingdom: Plantae
- Clade: Embryophytes
- Clade: Tracheophytes
- Clade: Spermatophytes
- Clade: Angiosperms
- Clade: Eudicots
- Clade: Rosids
- Order: Malvales
- Family: Malvaceae
- Subfamily: Bombacoideae
- Genus: Cavanillesia; Ruiz & Pav. (1794)

Synonyms
- Pourretia Willd. (1800)

= Cavanillesia =

Genus of flowering plants

Cavanillesia is a genus of trees in the family Malvaceae. It is native to Panama and tropical South America.

== Species ==
Five species are accepted.

- Cavanillesia arborea (Willd.) K.Schum.
- Cavanillesia chicamochae Fern.Alonso
- Cavanillesia hylogeiton Ulbr.
- Cavanillesia platanifolia (Bonpl.) Kunth
- Cavanillesia umbellata Ruiz & Pav.
