= Neobuchia =

Conservation status
- Least Concern (IUCN 3.1)

Scientific classification
- Kingdom: Plantae
- Clade: Tracheophytes
- Clade: Angiosperms
- Clade: Eudicots
- Clade: Rosids
- Order: Malvales
- Family: Malvaceae
- Genus: Neobuchia; Urb. (1902)
- Species: N. paulinae

Binomial name
- Neobuchia paulinae Urb. (1902)

Species of flowering plant

Neobuchia is a monotypic genus of flowering plant belonging to the family Malvaceae. It only contains one known species, Neobuchia paulinae, commonly known as mapou blanc in Haitian Creole. It is a tree endemic to Haiti on the island of Hispaniola.

== Taxonomy ==
The genus name of Neobuchia is in honour of Wilhelm Buch (1862–1943), a German pharmacist and botanist. The Latin specific epithet of paulinae refers to Wilhelm Buch's wife, Amalia Pauline Wilhelmine Buch. Both the genus and the species were first described and published in I.Urban, Symb. Antill. Vol.3 on page 319 in 1902.

== Description ==
It is a tree up to 20 meters tall, with noticeable thorns along the bark. It is found in both dry forest and humid forest at low elevations.
