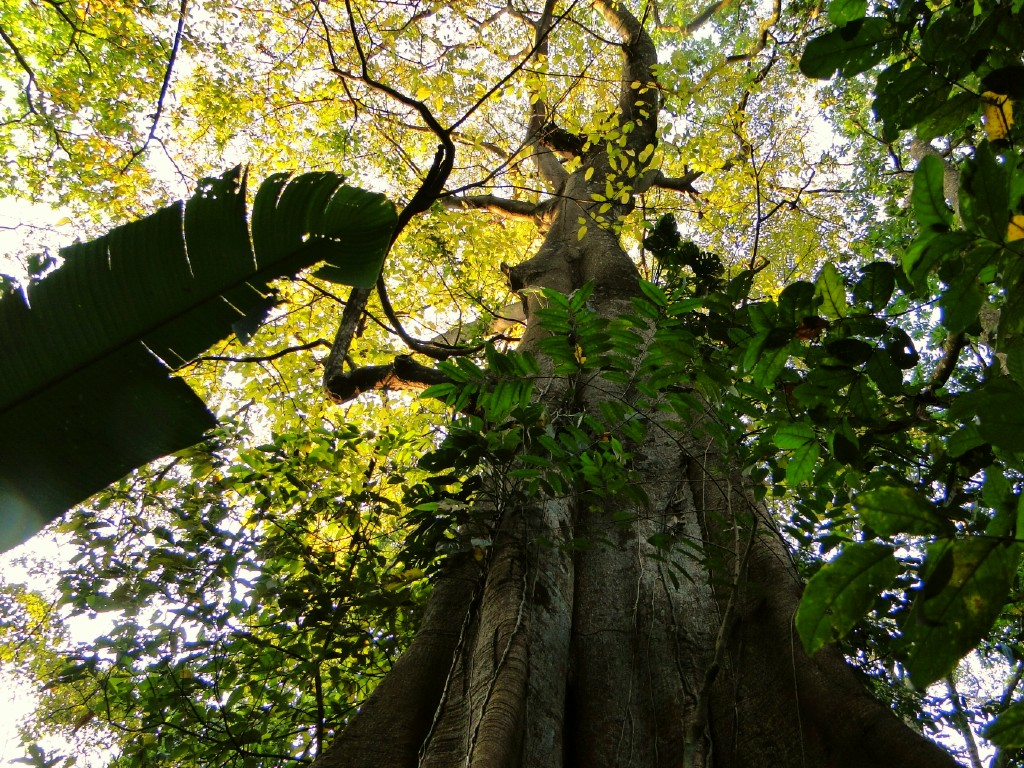
- Gyranthera caribensis

Scientific classification
- Kingdom: Plantae
- Clade: Tracheophytes
- Clade: Angiosperms
- Clade: Eudicots
- Clade: Rosids
- Order: Malvales
- Family: Malvaceae
- Subfamily: Bombacoideae
- Genus: Gyranthera; Pittier

Species
- Gyranthera amphibiolepis W.Palacios; Gyranthera caribensis Pittier; Gyranthera darienensis Pittier

= Gyranthera =

Genus of flowering plants

Gyranthera is a genus of tropical trees of South America and Central America in the family Malvaceae.

Three species are accepted.

- Gyranthera amphibiolepis W.Palacios is endemic to Ecuador, and was newly described in 2012.
- Gyranthera caribensis Pittier is a tall (up to 60 metres) buttressed tree, which grows in the Cordillera de la Costa montane forests of northern Venezuela.
- Gyranthera darienensis Pittier is a threatened species native to Colombia, Ecuador, and Panama.
