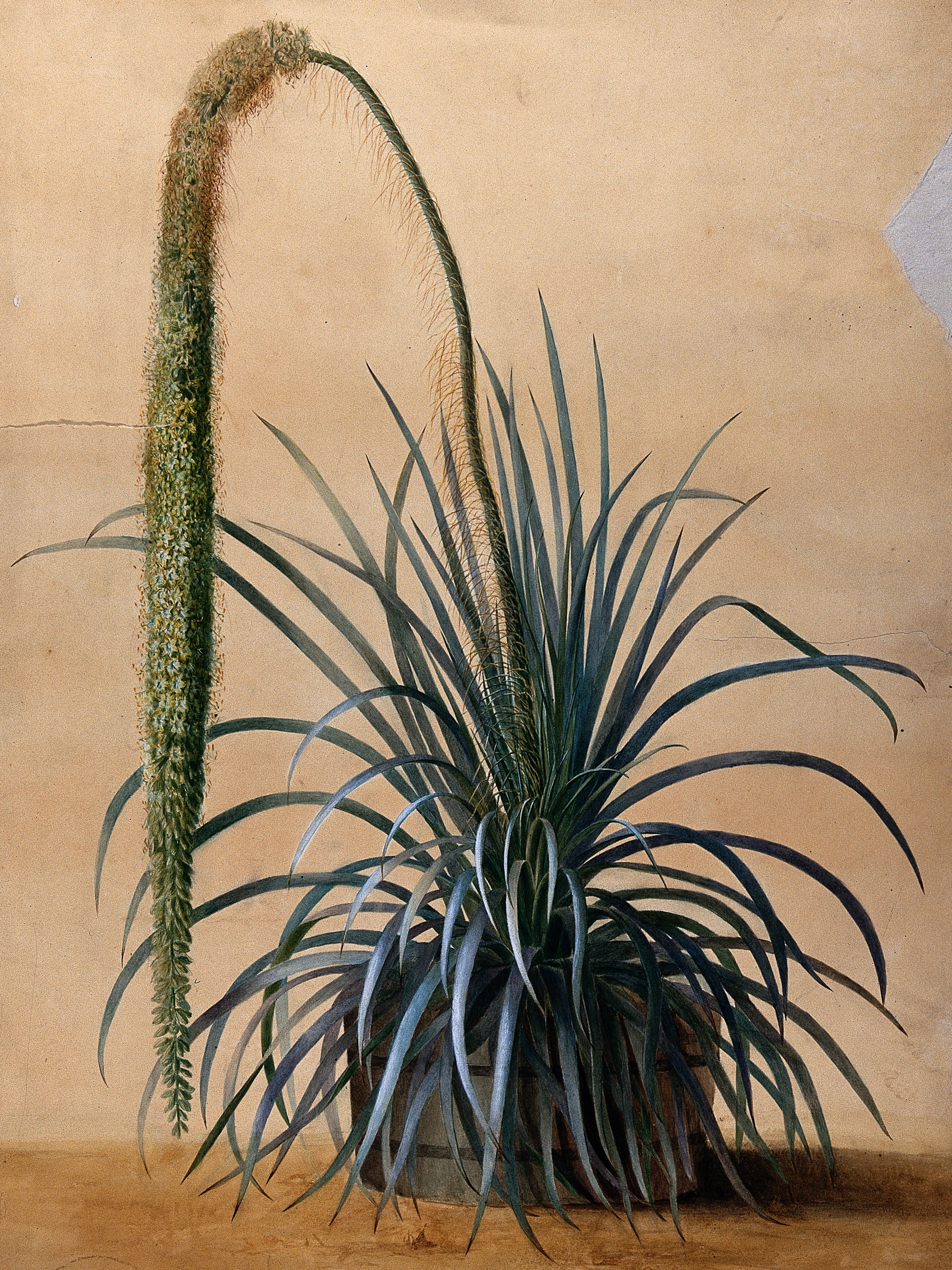

Scientific classification
- Kingdom: Plantae
- Clade: Tracheophytes
- Clade: Angiosperms
- Clade: Eudicots
- Clade: Rosids
- Order: Malvales
- Family: Malvaceae
- Genus: Aguiaria; Ducke
- Species: A. excelsa

Binomial name
- Aguiaria excelsa Ducke

= Aguiaria =

Genus of flowering plants

Aguiaria is a monotypic genus of flowering plants belonging to the family Malvaceae.

Its native range is northern Brazil.

The genus was named after Brás de Aguiar (1881–1947), Brazilian naval officer who supported the author of the genus, Adolpho Ducke.

It has one species, Aguiaria excelsa Ducke which was first published and described in Ann. Acad. Brasil. Sci. Vol.7 on page 329 in 1935.
