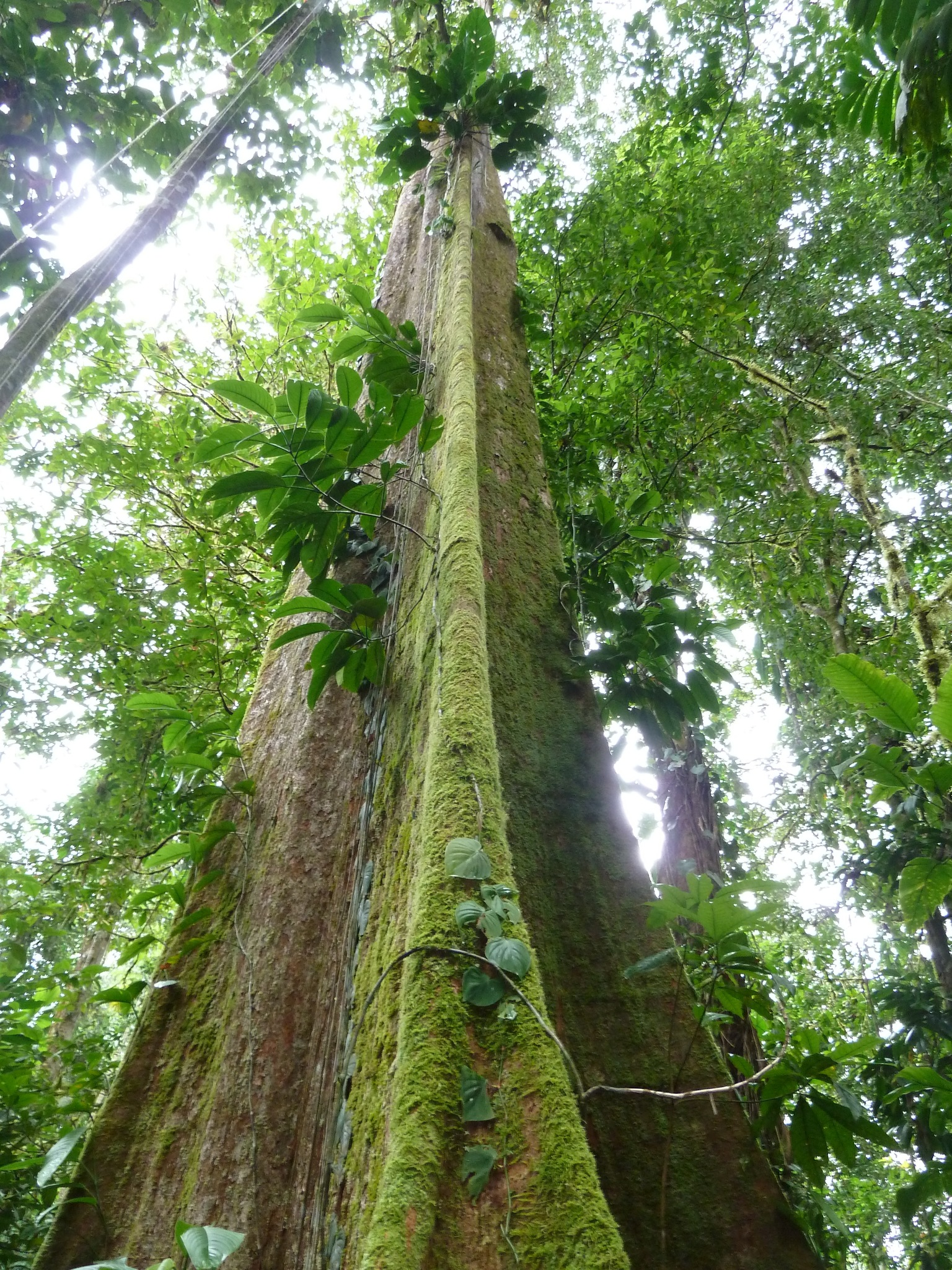
- Huberodendron allenii

Scientific classification
- Kingdom: Plantae
- Clade: Tracheophytes
- Clade: Angiosperms
- Clade: Eudicots
- Clade: Rosids
- Order: Malvales
- Family: Malvaceae
- Subfamily: Bombacoideae
- Genus: Huberodendron; Ducke

= Huberodendron =

Genus of flowering plants

Huberodendron is a genus of flowering plants in the family Malvaceae. It contains the following species:

- Huberodendron allenii Standl. & L.O.Williams
- Huberodendron ingens Ducke
- Huberodendron patinoi Cuatrec.
- Huberodendron swietenioides (Gleason) Ducke
