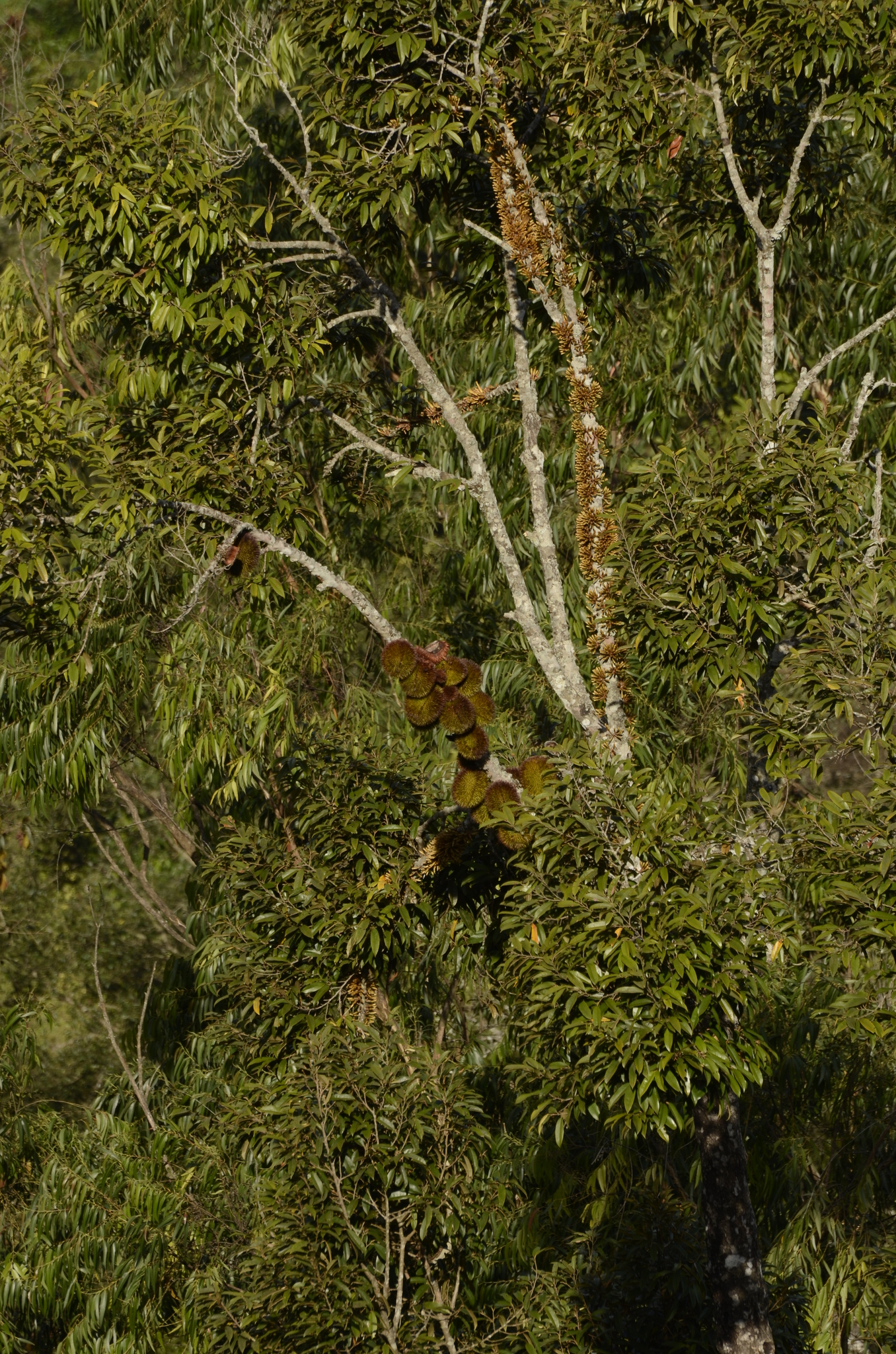
- Cullenia ceylanica at Valparai, Sri Lanka

Conservation status
- Vulnerable (IUCN 2.3)

Scientific classification
- Kingdom: Plantae
- Clade: Tracheophytes
- Clade: Angiosperms
- Clade: Eudicots
- Clade: Rosids
- Order: Malvales
- Family: Malvaceae
- Genus: Cullenia
- Species: C. ceylanica

Binomial name
- Cullenia ceylanica (Gardner)Wight ex K.Schum.

Synonyms
- Durio ceylanicus Gardner; Cullenia excelsa Wight; Durio zibethinus Moon [Illegitimate]

= Cullenia ceylanica =

Ceylon durian

Species of flowering plant

Cullenia ceylanica (syn. Durio ceylanicus), the Ceylon durian, is a species of flowering plant in the family Malvaceae. It is endemic to Sri Lanka. The Ceylon durian, a large prickly fruit, is inedible and does not stink.

== Culture ==
Known as කට බොඩ (kata boda) by local people.
