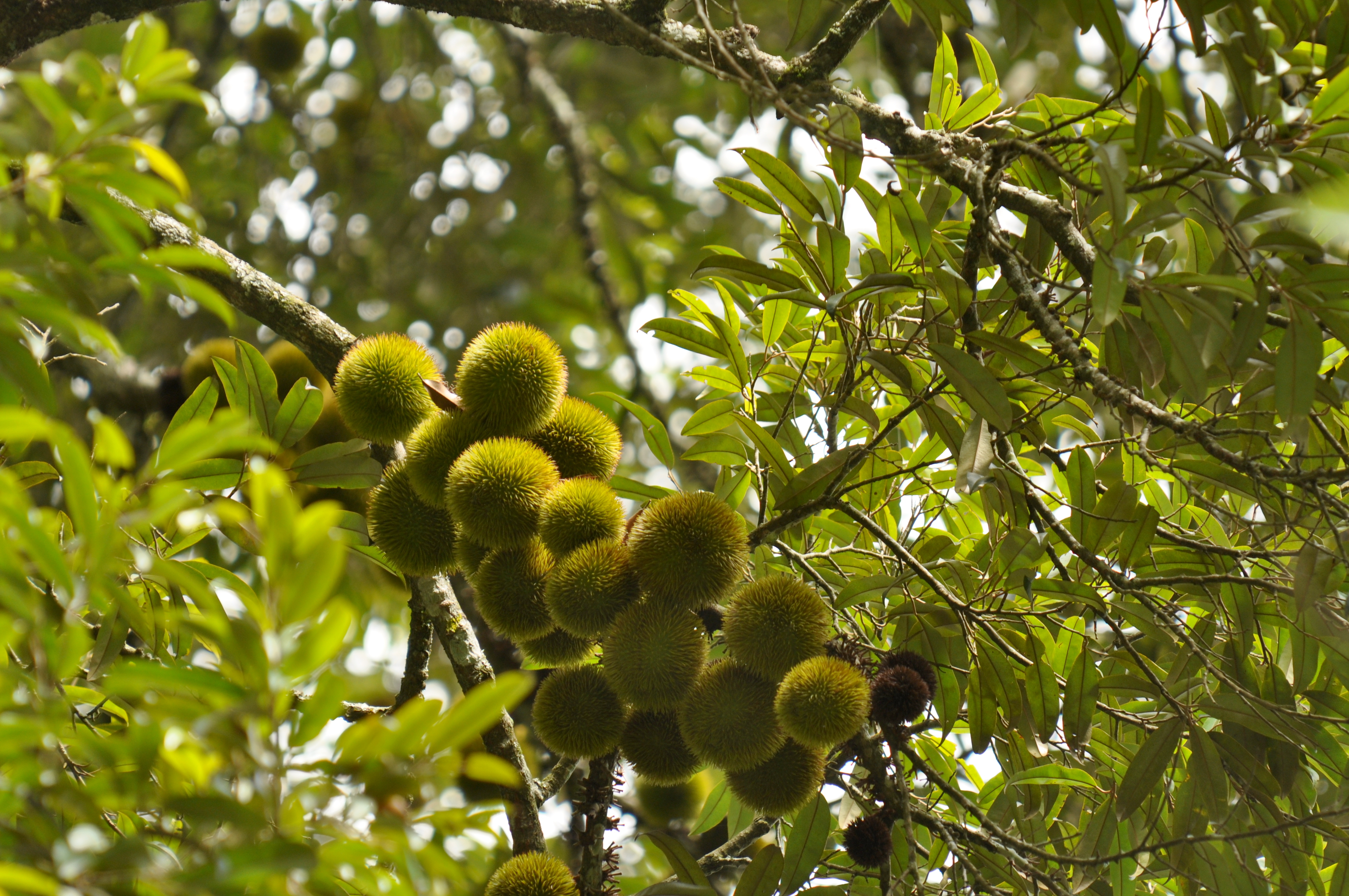
- Cullenia exarillata fruiting branch

Scientific classification
- Kingdom: Plantae
- Clade: Tracheophytes
- Clade: Angiosperms
- Clade: Eudicots
- Clade: Rosids
- Order: Malvales
- Family: Malvaceae
- Subfamily: Helicteroideae
- Tribe: Durioneae
- Genus: Cullenia; Wight

Species
- Cullenia ceylanica (Gardner) Wight ex K.Schum.; Cullenia exarillata A.Robyns; Cullenia rosayroana Kosterm.

= Cullenia =

Genus of flowering plants

Cullenia is a genus of flowering plants native to India and Sri Lanka. Earlier classification schemes placed the genus in the kapok-tree family (Bombacaceae), but the Angiosperm Phylogeny Group places it in the mallow family (Malvaceae).

The name is after General William Cullen (1785–1862), a Resident in the court of the Maharaja of Travancore who also took an interest in botany.

Three species are accepted.

- Cullenia ceylanica (Gardner) Wight ex K.Schum. (syn. Cullenia excelsa Wight) – Sri Lanka
- Cullenia exarillata A.Robyns – southwestern India
- Cullenia rosayroana Kosterm. – Sri Lanka
