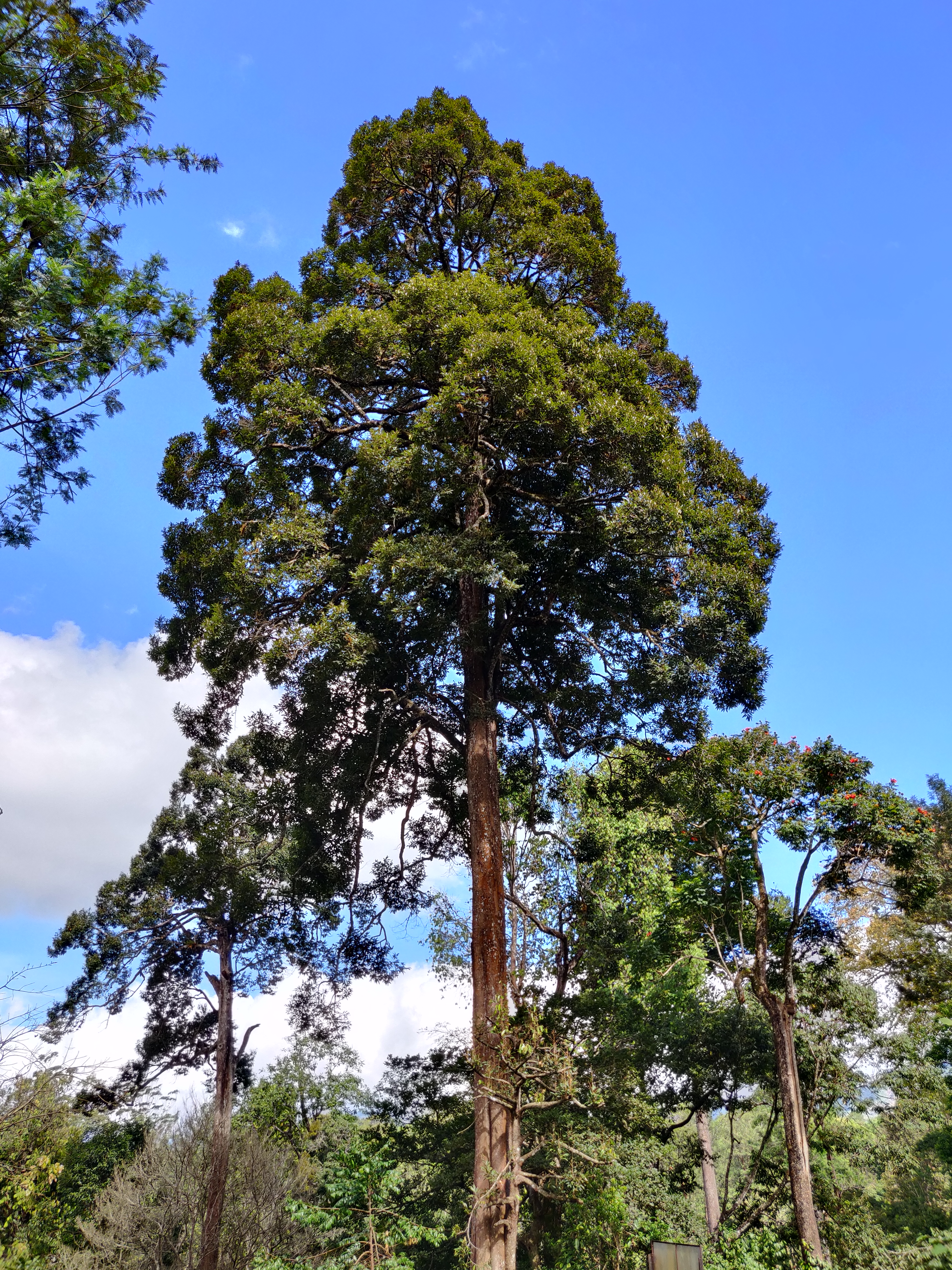
- Cullenia exarillata tree
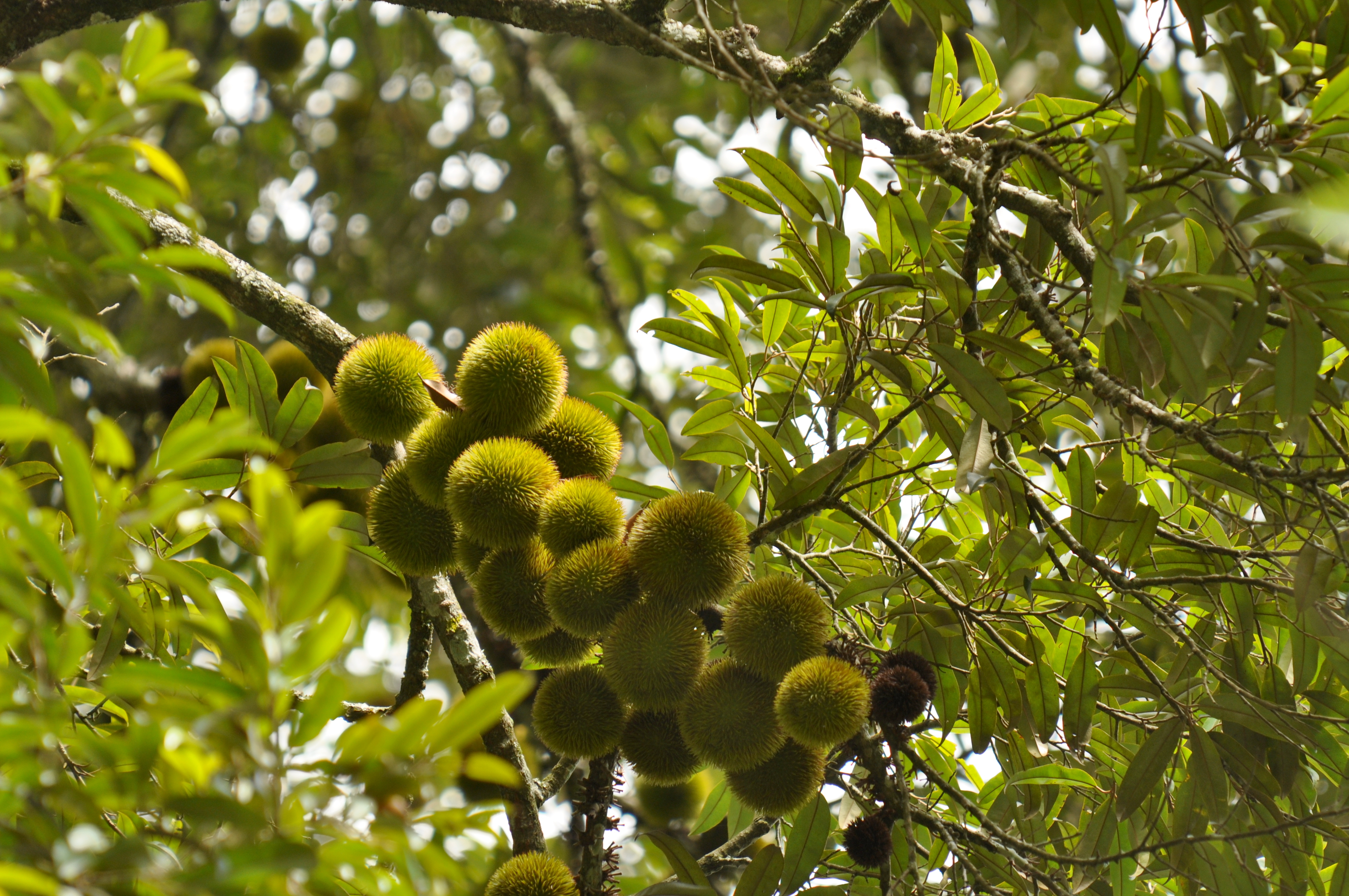
- Cullenia exarillata fruiting branch

Conservation status
- Near Threatened (IUCN 3.1)

Scientific classification
- Kingdom: Plantae
- Clade: Tracheophytes
- Clade: Angiosperms
- Clade: Eudicots
- Clade: Rosids
- Order: Malvales
- Family: Malvaceae
- Genus: Cullenia
- Species: C. exarillata

Binomial name
- Cullenia exarillata A.Robyns

Synonyms
- C. excelsa, Durio ceylanicus, Durio exarillatus Wight

= Cullenia exarillata =

Species of flowering plant

Cullenia exarillata (Tamil Name: வெடிப்பலா, Kadar (Anamalai hills) Name: முள்ளாலி, Muthuvan (Anamalai hills) Name: காரானி) is a flowering plant evergreen tree species in the family Malvaceae that is endemic to the rainforests of the southern Western Ghats in India. It is one of the characteristic trees of the mid-elevation tropical wet evergreen rainforests and an important food plant for the endemic primate, the lion-tailed macaque.

== Description ==
Tall evergreen trees with smooth greyish white bark, flaking in mature trees, with straight boles, frequently buttressed. The branches are horizontal often with series of knob-like tubercles (for cauliflorous attachment of flowers and fruits). The young branchlets and the underside of leaves are covered by golden brown peltate (or shield like) scales. Leaves are simple, alternate, glabrous, shiny green above and covered beneath with silvery or orangish peltate scales.

The tubular, hermaphroditic flowers (also covered by golden brown scales) are about 4–5 cm long and cream or pinkish brown in colour. The flowers lack petals and are formed of tubular bracteoles and tube-like calyx, obscurely 5-lobed. The round fruits, about 10–13 cm in diameter and covered with spines, are clustered along the branches. The fruit is a capsule, 5-valved, containing many reddish brown seeds about 4–5 cm long and 2–3 cm wide. In the fruit, the seeds are covered by a fleshy, whitish aril. The fruit dehisces open when mature and dry to release seeds.

== Taxonomy ==
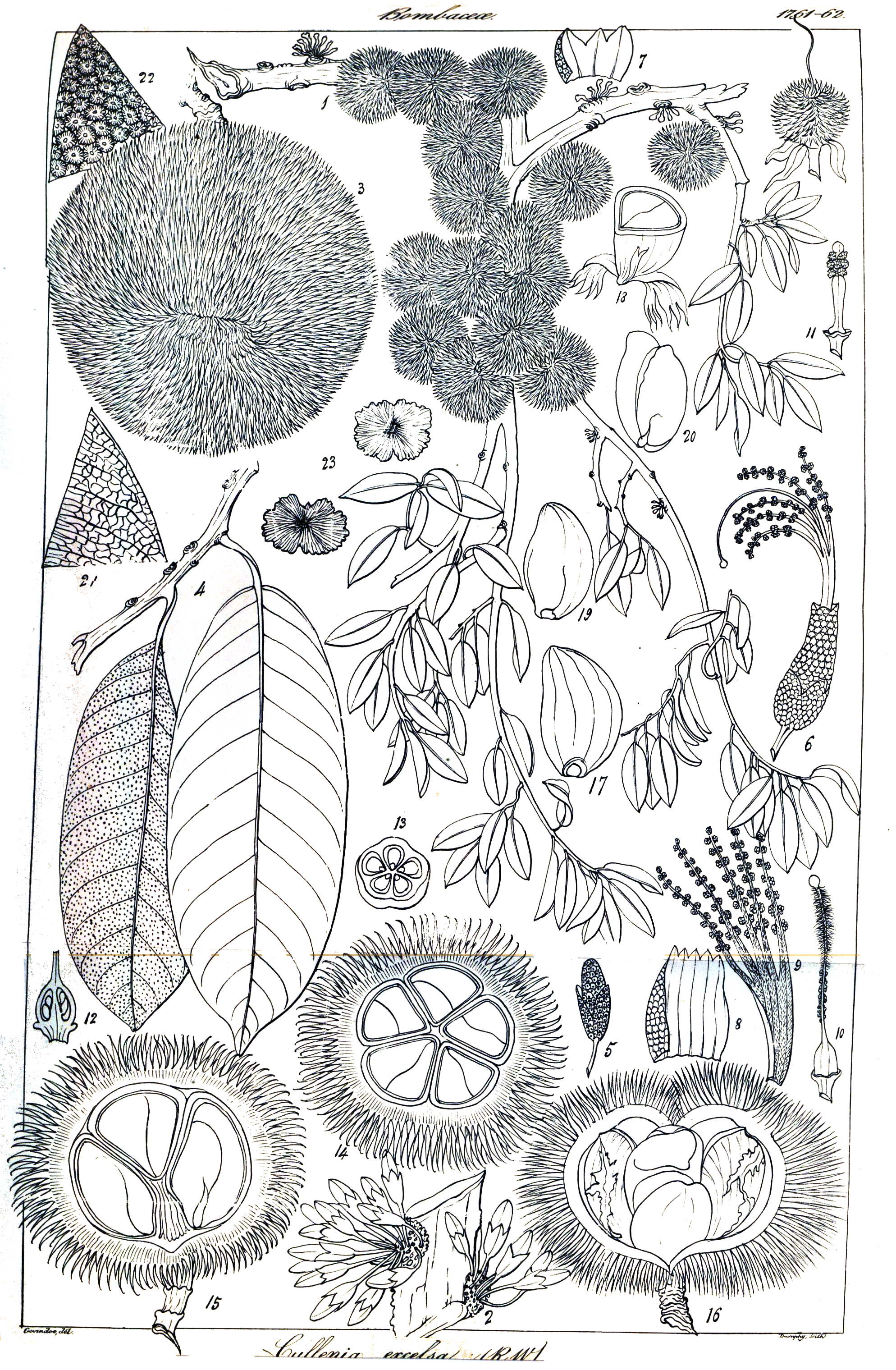
Cullenia exarillata, described by Robert Wight as Cullenia excelsa, and illustrated here by Govindoo

The genus Cullenia was created by Robert Wight and commemorates William Cullen with the type species excelsa from India which Wight considered incorrectly as being identical to the Sri Lankan C. ceylanica which was earlier described under the genus Durio. André Robyns examined Wight's specimen and fresh specimens from southern India and noted it as being distinct and described it as C. exarillata in 1970. C. ceylanica has the seeds covered by an aril whereas C. exarillata does not have the aril surrounding the seeds. The genus is evolutionarily close to Boschia and Durio.

== Distribution and habitat ==
The species is characteristically found and dominant in the mid-elevation (700 m to 1400 m) tropical wet evergreen rainforests, which has been called the Cullenia exarillata - Mesua ferrea - Palaquium ellipticum type. It occurs from the southern tip of the Western Ghats in Kalakad-Mundanthurai Tiger Reserve and Agasthyamalai hills to Wayanad and Kodagu in the Nilgiri Biosphere Reserve.

== Breeding system and dispersal ==
The hermaphroditic (or bisexual) flowers are mainly pollinated by bats (Cynopterus and Rousettus) and arboreal mammals (Lion-tailed macaque, brown palm civet, Indian giant squirrel, Nilgiri langur, and Indian giant flying squirrel). These mammals and other rodents that visit the flowers such as dusky-striped squirrel and Malabar spiny dormouse also act as flower predators as they consume a substantial number of flowers. The flowers are also visited by a number of bird species, including Indian white-eye, square-tailed bulbul, yellow-browed bulbul, brown-cheeked fulvetta, common rosefinch, Kerala laughingthrush, and white-cheeked barbet. However, flowers visited by birds tend to be aborted.

Cullenia exarillata is an outcrossing species, producing negligible fruit-set under geitonogamy and no fruit-set under autogamy. The seeds are mechanically dispersed (gravity) as well as by Lion-tailed Macaques over short distances.

== Ecology ==
Cullenia exarillata is a dominant tree species in the mid-elevation tropical rainforests (between 700 and 1,400 m elevation) of the southern Western Ghats. It is also among the most abundant canopy trees in relatively undisturbed mature wet evergreen forests. It occurs at a density of 20 trees/ha to 59.6 trees/ha in mid-elevation wet evergreen forests of the Anamalai Hills.

Individual trees were estimated to produce between 1300 and 26000 flowers (average = 8734) chiefly between February and May, followed by a fruiting peak between May and September, in a rainforest at the southern tip of the Western Ghats. In the Anamalai Hills further north in the southern Western Ghats, the species was observed flowering between October and February. As the tree flowers abundantly during the dry season, a period of fruit scarcity in the forest, the flowers attract many diurnal and nocturnal frugivorous mammals and birds, making the tree a possible keystone species in these forests. The flowers are low in nectar but contain fleshy sepals embedded with nectaries which are the main reward for animal visitors. The flowers are eaten by endemic arboreal mammals such as Lion-tailed Macaque, Brown Palm Civet, Indian giant squirrel, Bonnet macaque, and Nilgiri langur. The base of the sepals are consumed and the anthers and stigma are discarded.

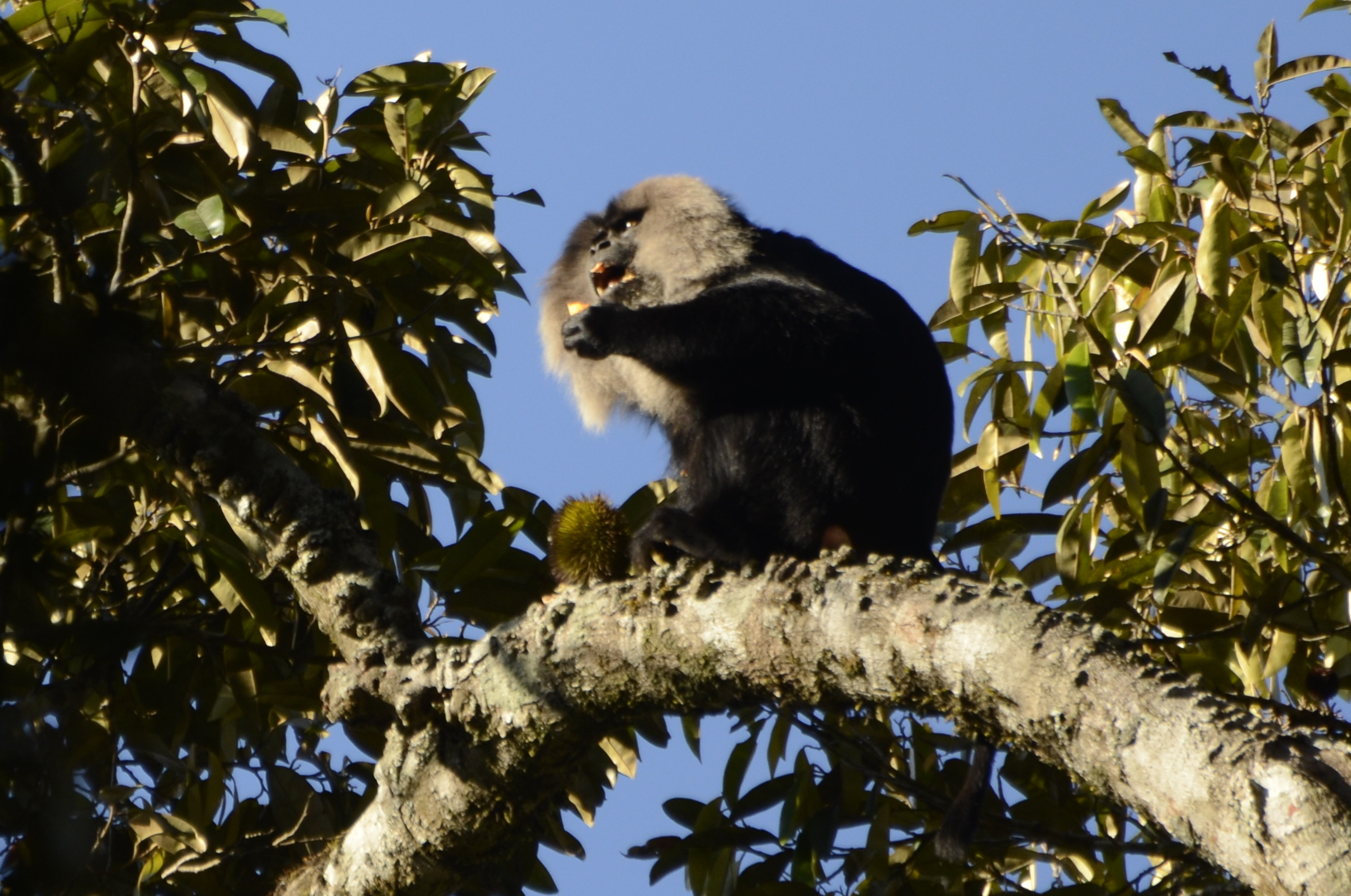
Lion-tailed macaque consume the seeds and aril of Cullenia exarillata fruit

The seeds and flowers of this species form a major part of the diet of Lion-tailed macaque in mid-elevation rainforests: 24.8% of the annual diet in Puthuthottam forest fragment in the Anamalai Hills, 20.7% of annual diet in Silent Valley National Park. The seeds constituted about 20% of the annual fruit diet of the Lion-tailed macaque and 7.1% of Indian giant squirrel diet in mid-elevation rainforest of Pachapal Malai or Waterfall Shola in the Anamalai Hills. Seeds were also found to be a minor food resource (<1% annual diet) for Nilgiri langur in this study. In lower-elevation rainforests at Varagaliar in the Anamalai Hills, Cullenia exarillata comprised a smaller percentage (0.4 – 1.2%) of the annual diet of lion-tailed macaques, with the flowers, seeds, and aril being consumed. A seed predation rate of 45% has been estimated in a wet evergreen forest of the southern Western Ghats, caused by species such as Indian Giant squirrels that feed on unripe fruits (with softer spines) and Lion-tailed macaques that feed on ripe fruits (with hard spines). Seeds fallen on the forest floor also suffer high predation by mammals and insects, with 91.6% of the seeds predated in experimental plots open to all predators and 44% predated in plots where mammals were excluded. The study also reported that seeds of Cullenia exarillata were predated by three species of rodents (Malabar spiny dormouse, Rattus sp. and Indian crested porcupine), besides Indian spotted chevrotain, sambar, Indian muntjac, and a primate, Nilgiri langur. Seed predation is higher in rainforest fragments than in contiguous rainforests, which has been experimentally revealed to be largely due to predation by mammals.

== Conservation ==
The species is endemic to the Western Ghats and has not yet been assessed for the IUCN Red List. The tree may persist in rainforest fragments showing similar levels of flowering and fruit-set, and may even have higher fruit-set in some disturbed sites and on isolated trees. Highly disturbed sites, including plantations where understorey vegetation and canopy trees were removed, have lower density of Cullenia exarillata.

== Gallery ==
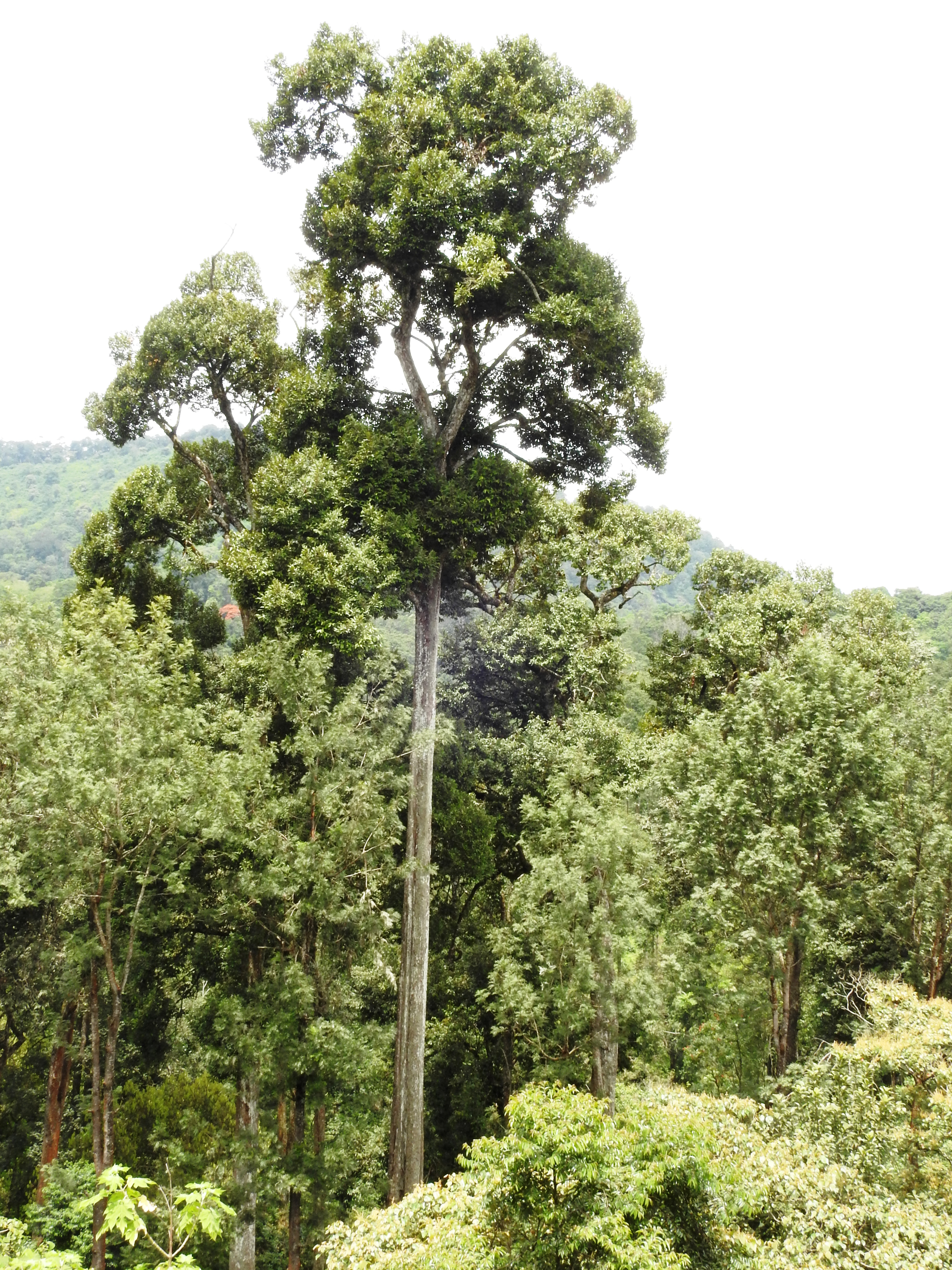
A Cullenia exarillata tree towering above others in the Anamalai Hills

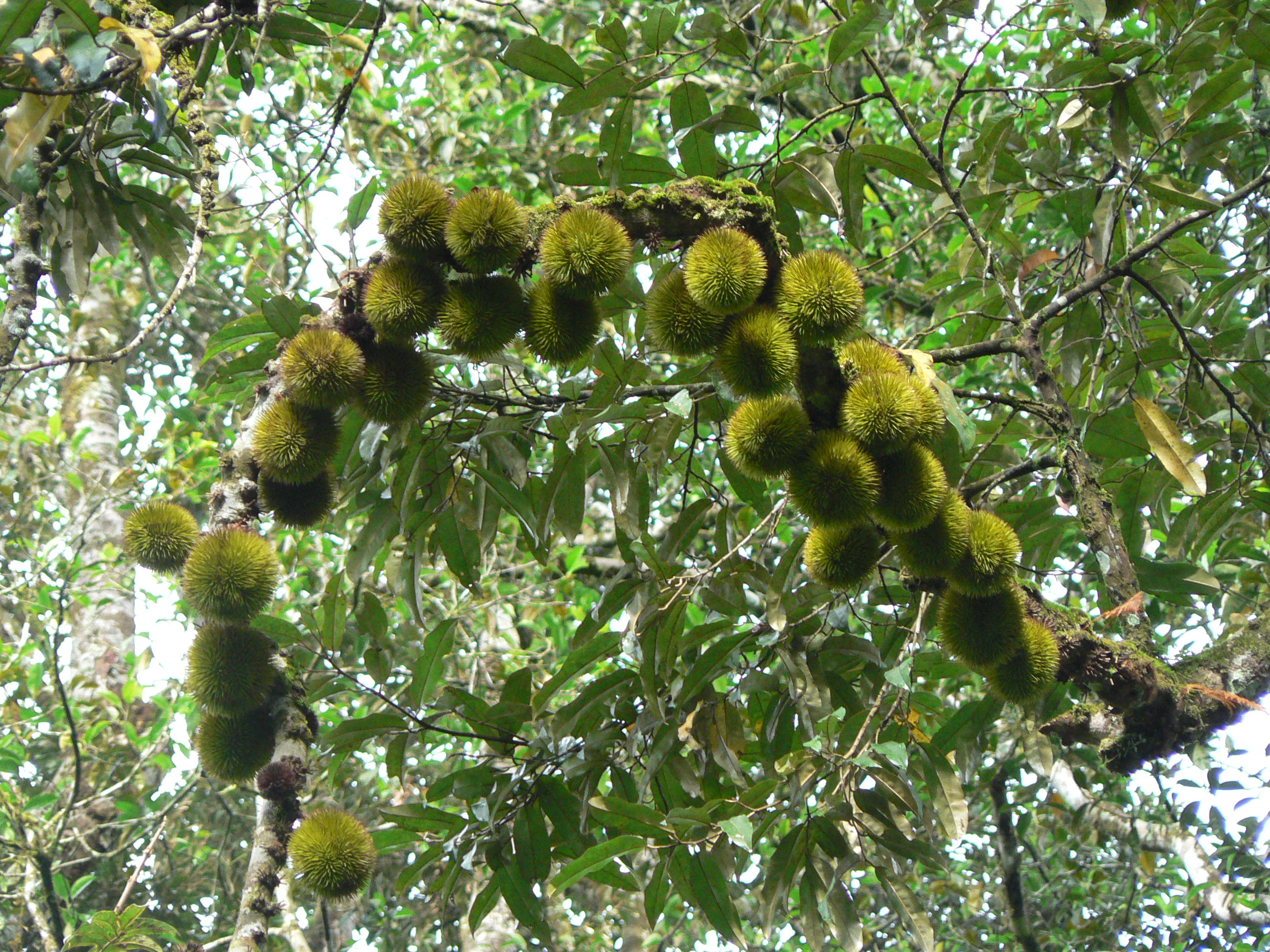
Fruiting branch in canopy

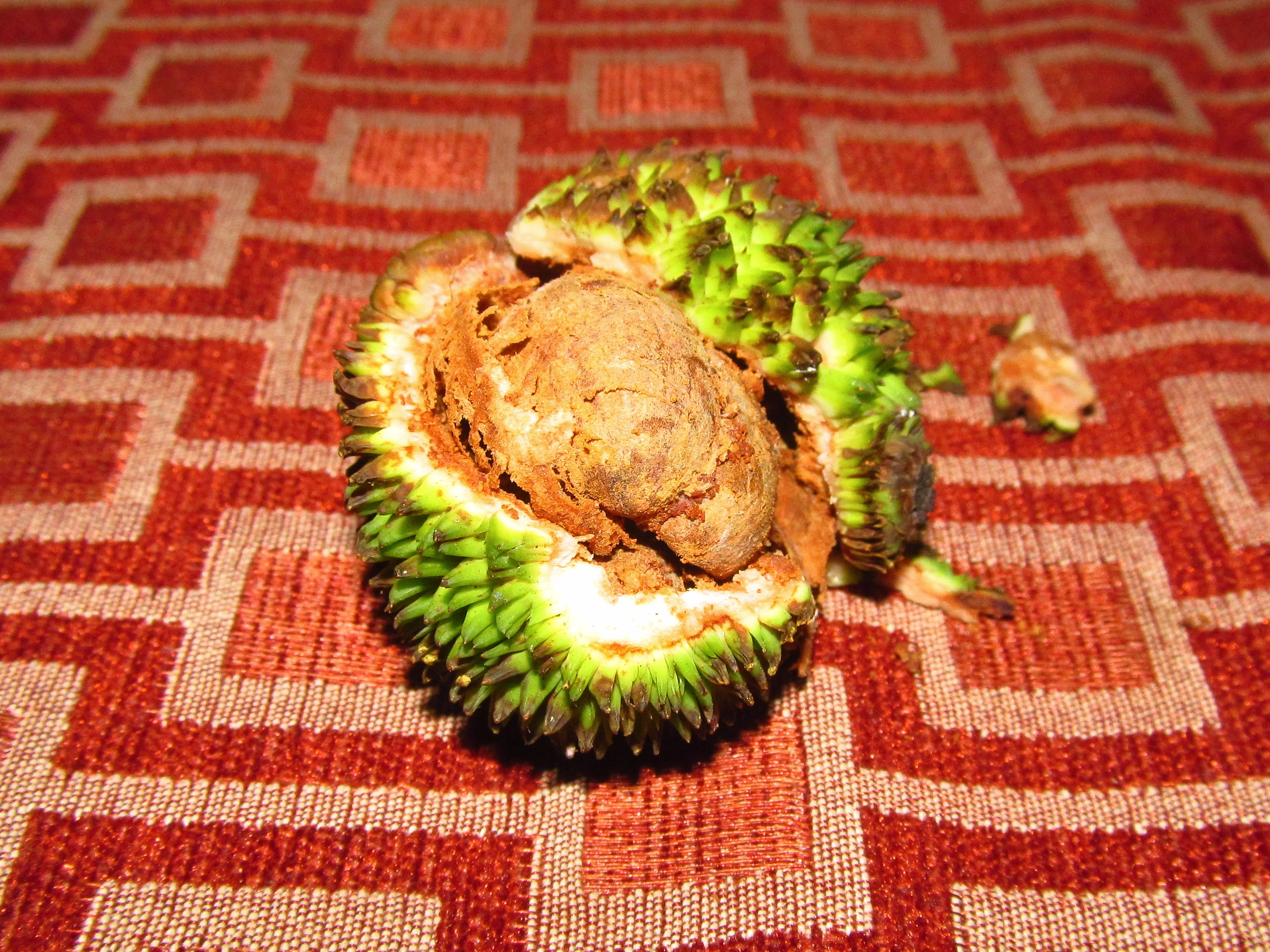
Ripe fruits

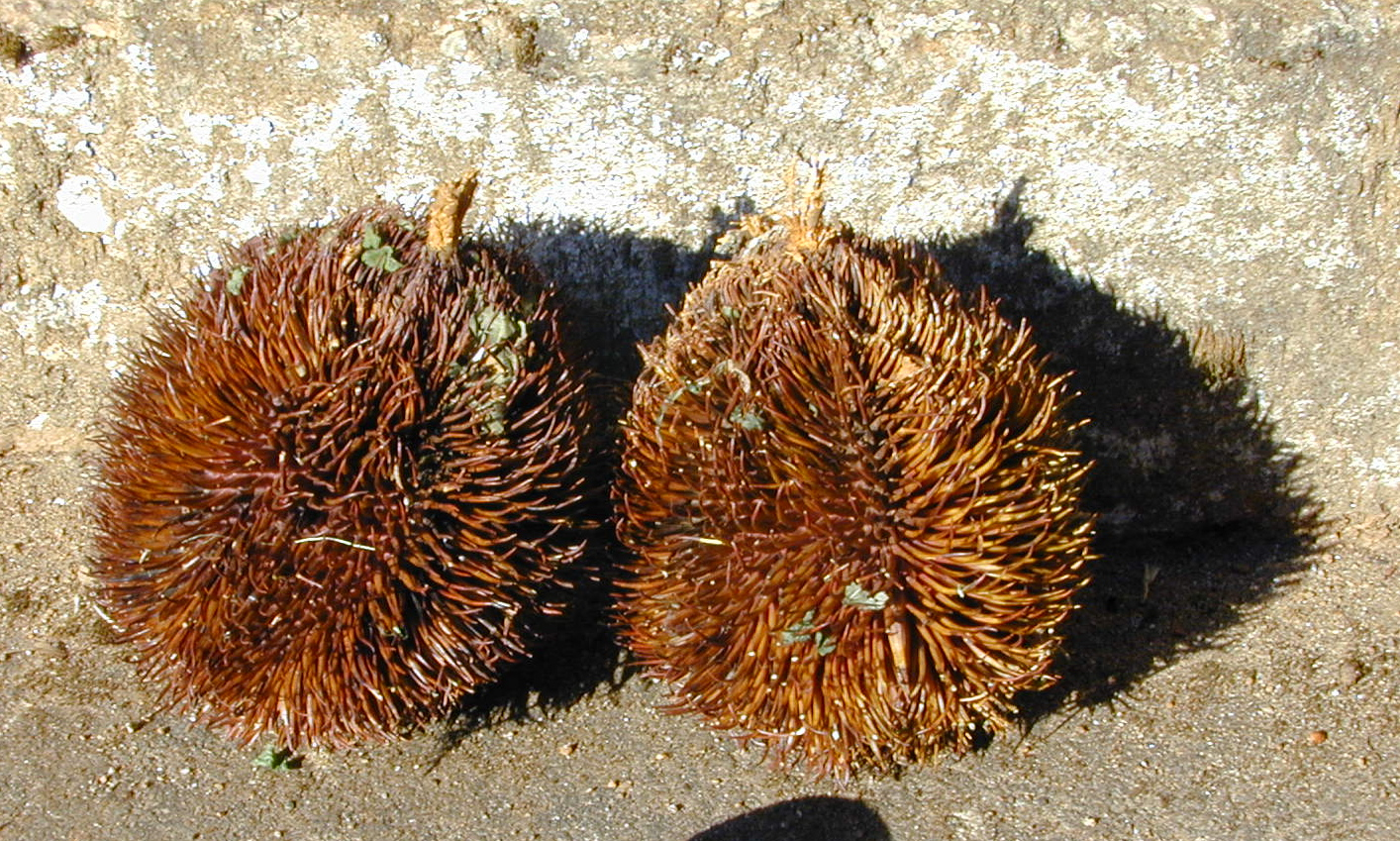
Mature fruits

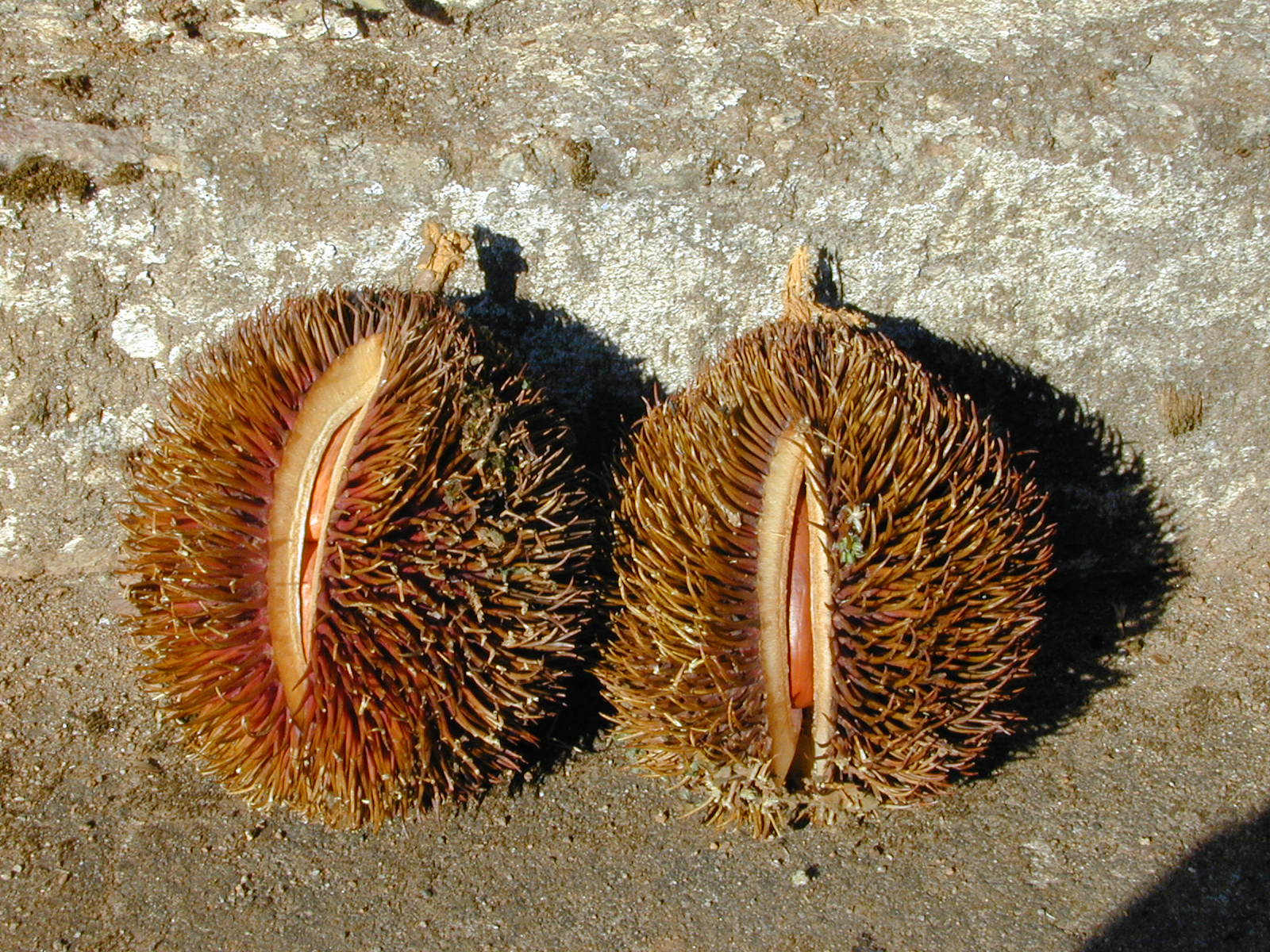
Mature fruits splitting

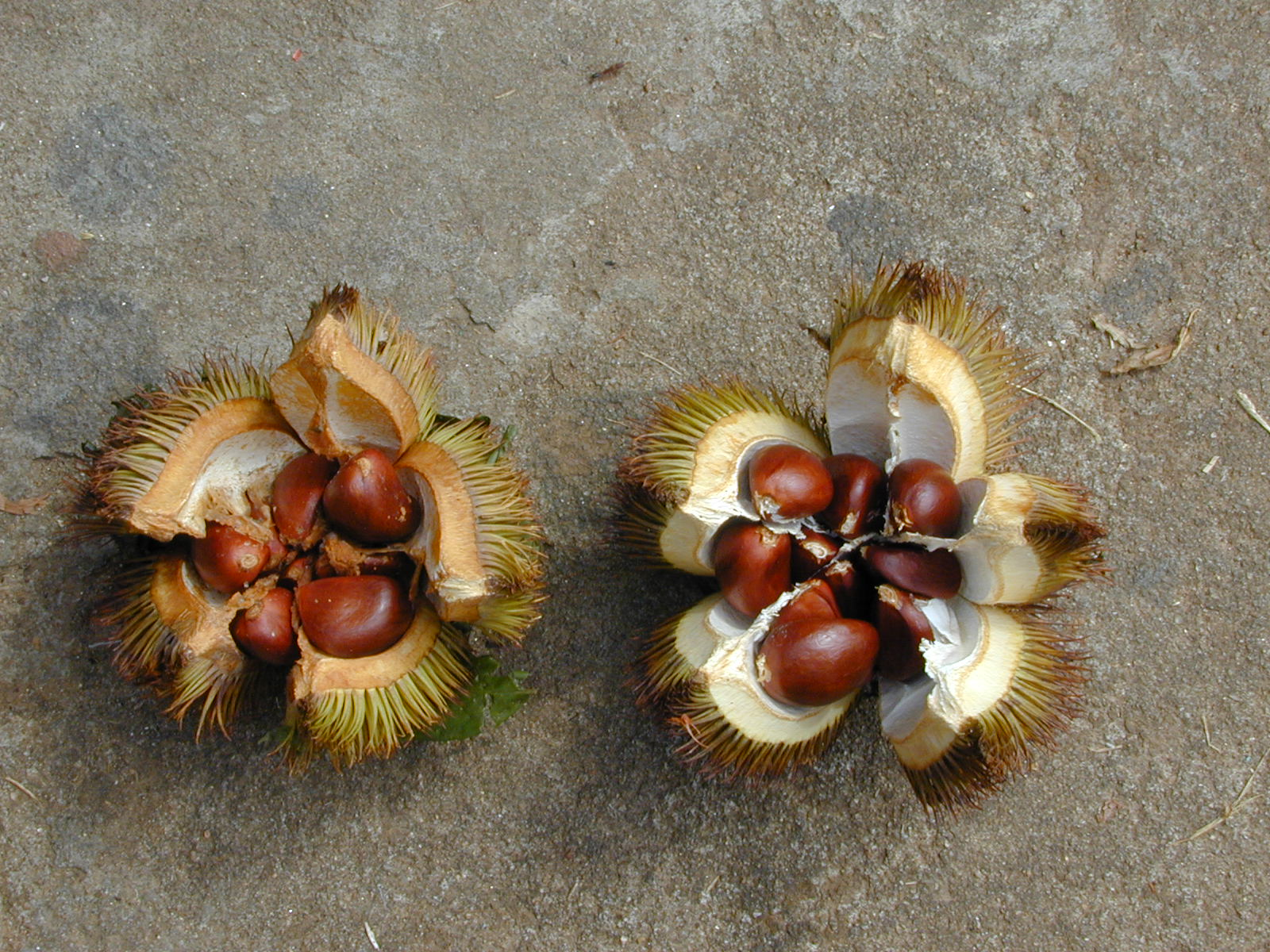
Mature fruits dehiscing open

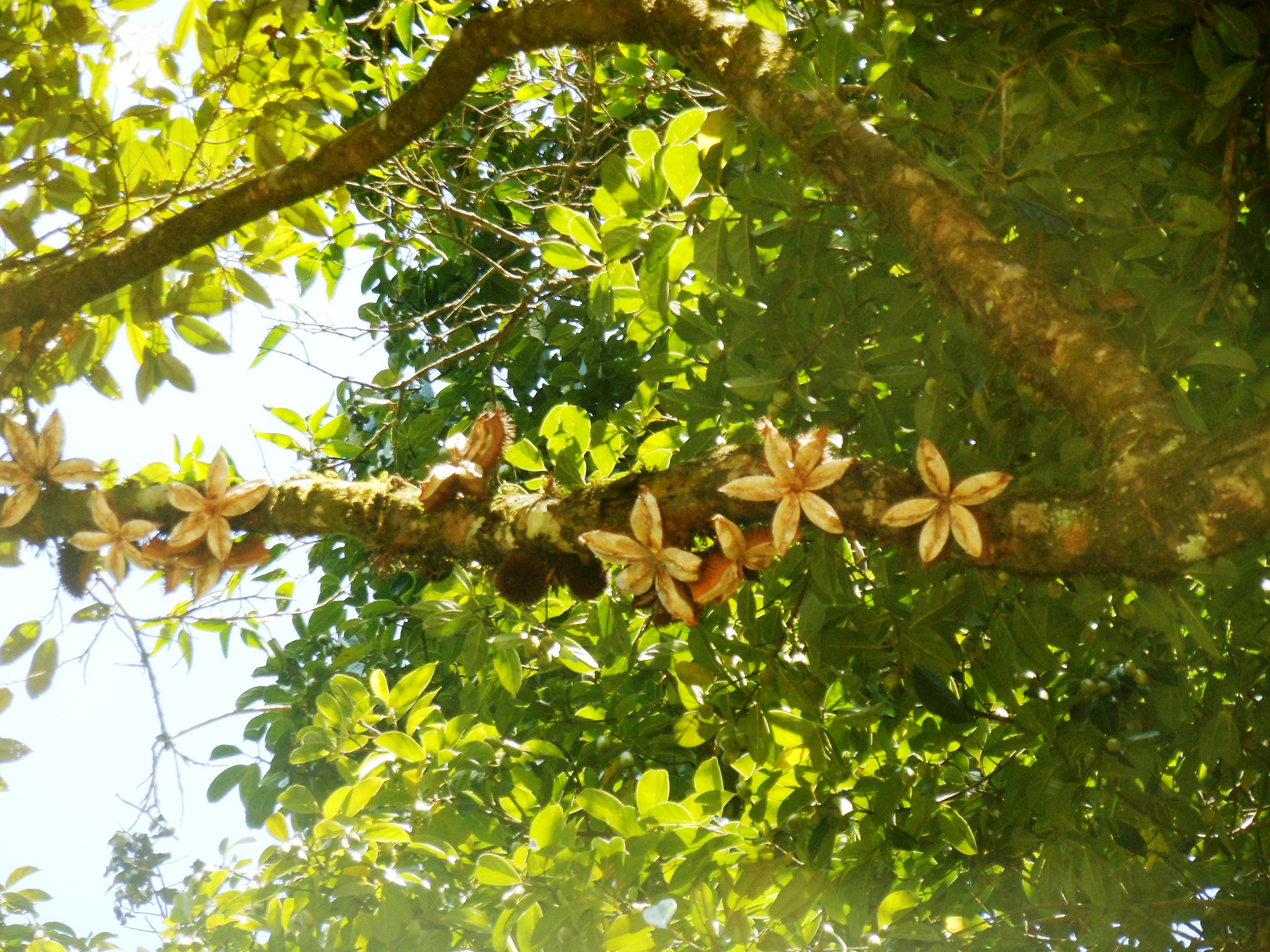
Dehisced fruits of Cullenia exarillata still on the tree

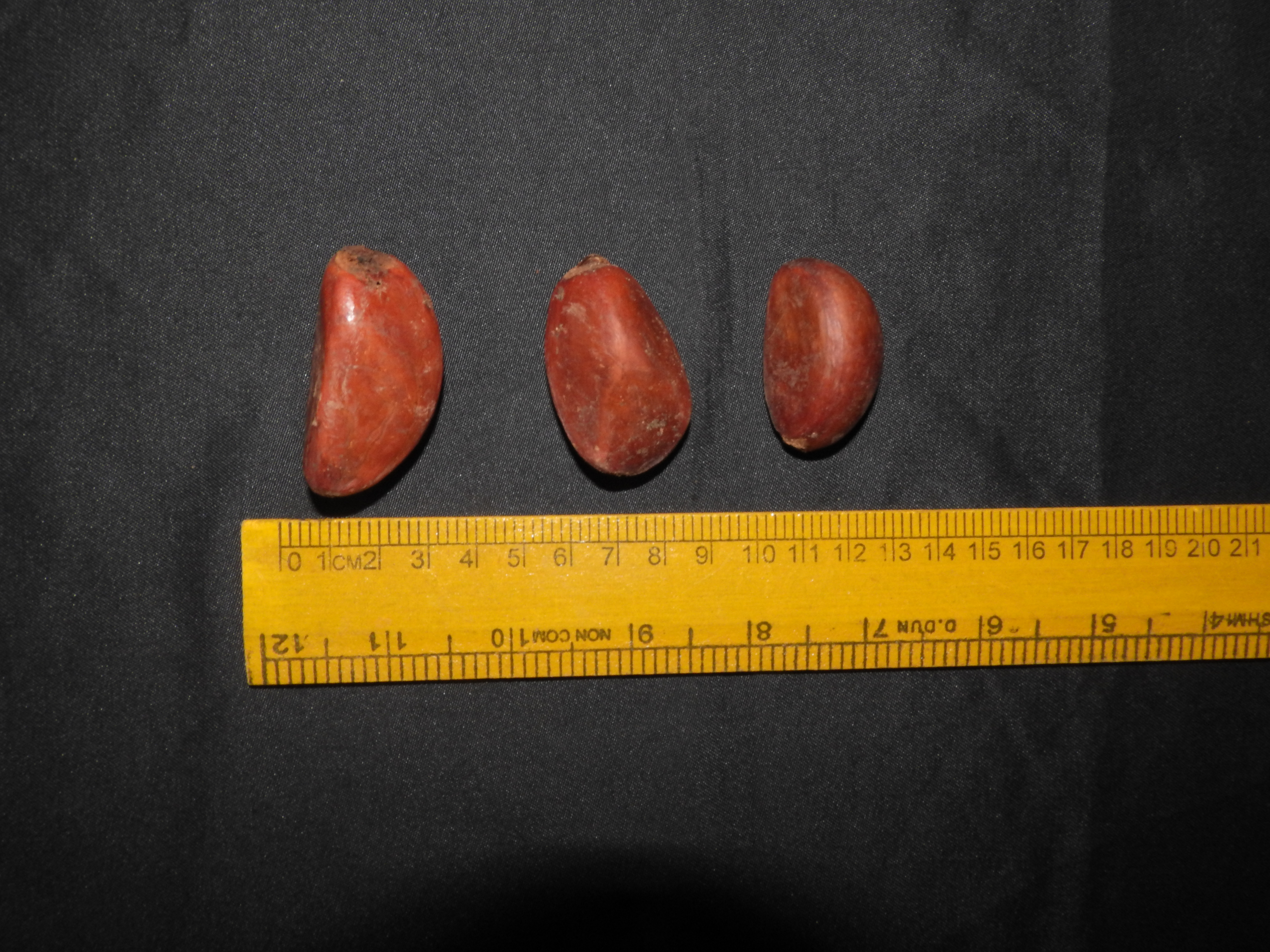
Seeds of Cullenia exarillata

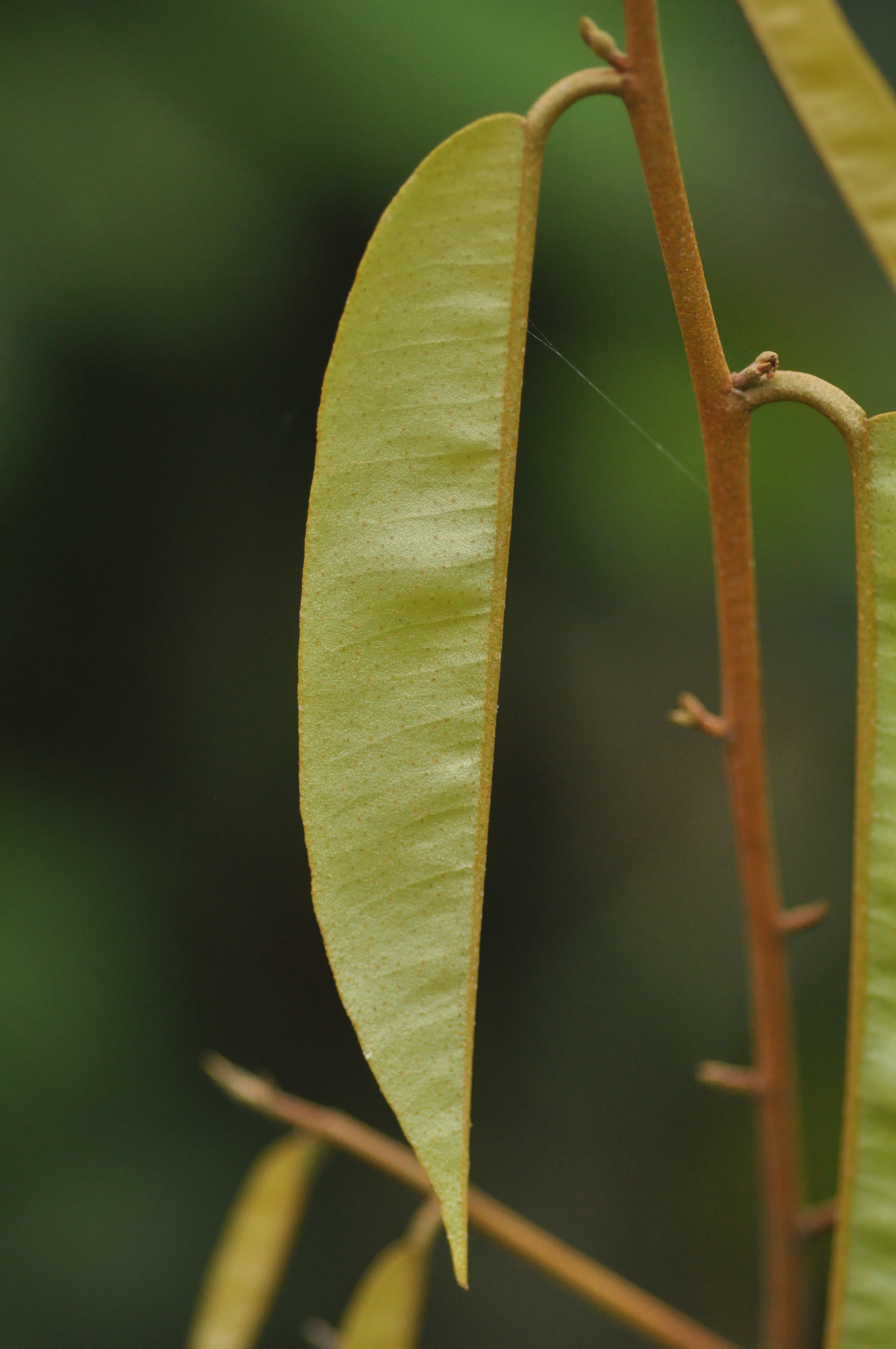
Young leaf before opening out

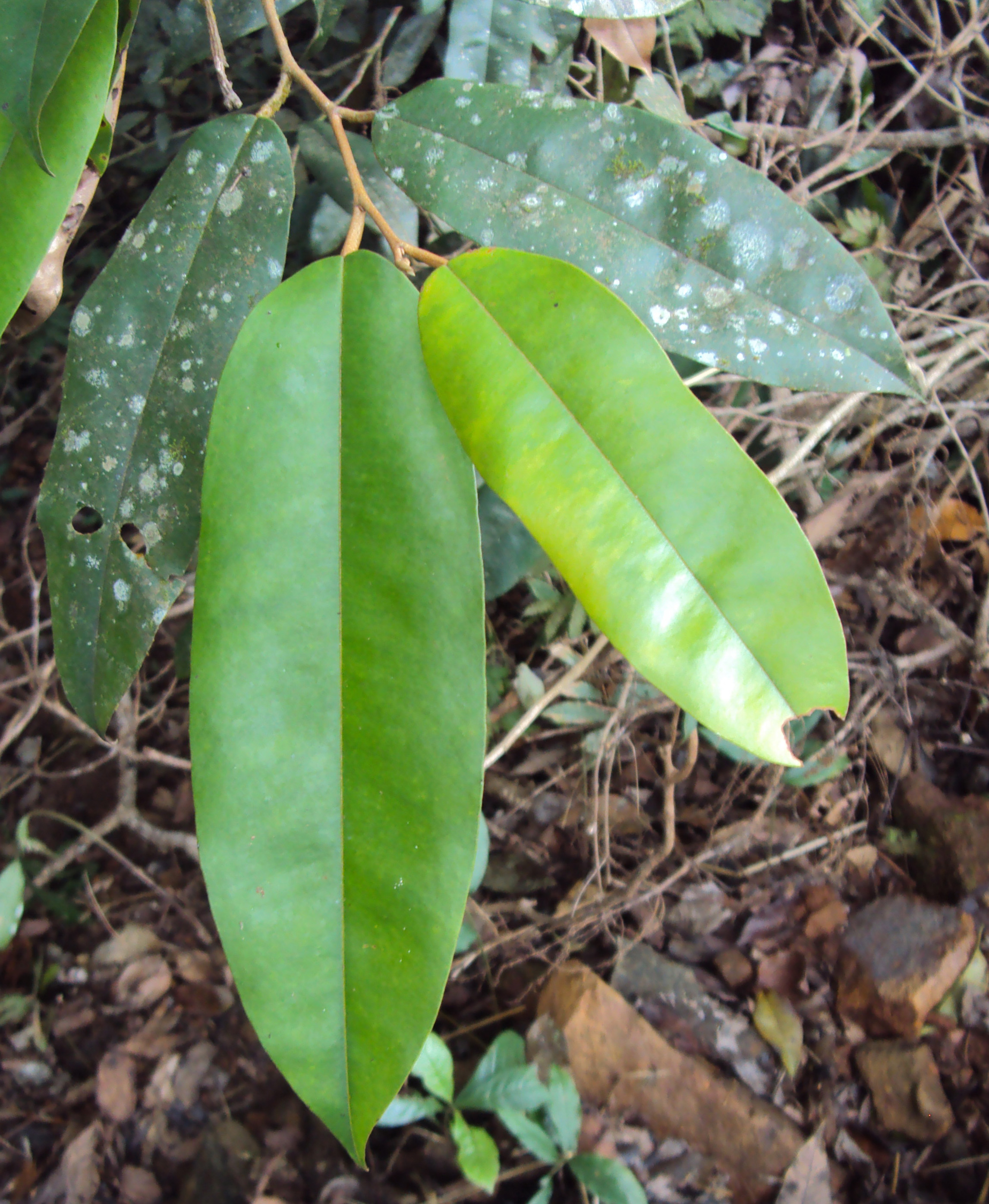
Upperside of leaves

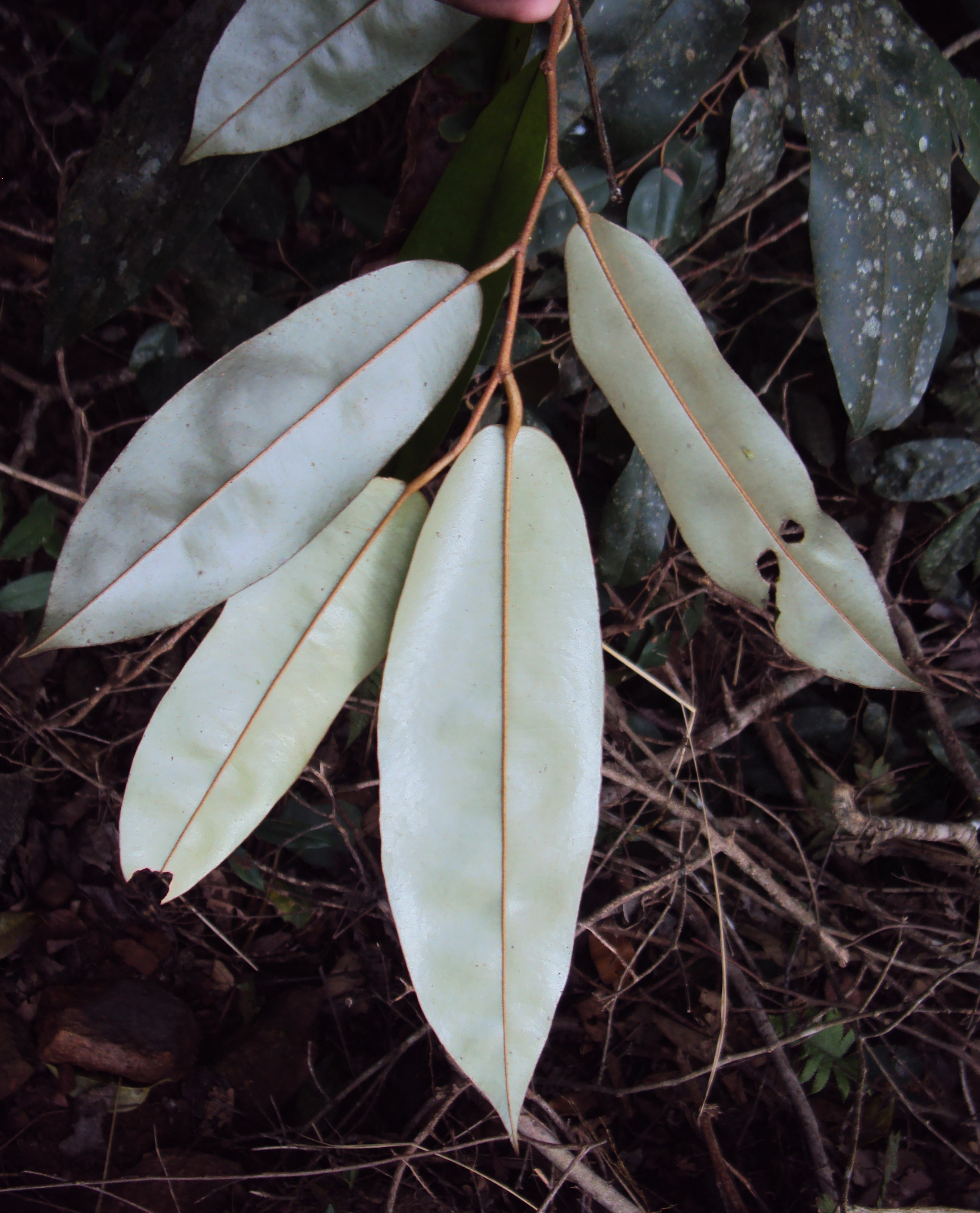
Underside of leaves

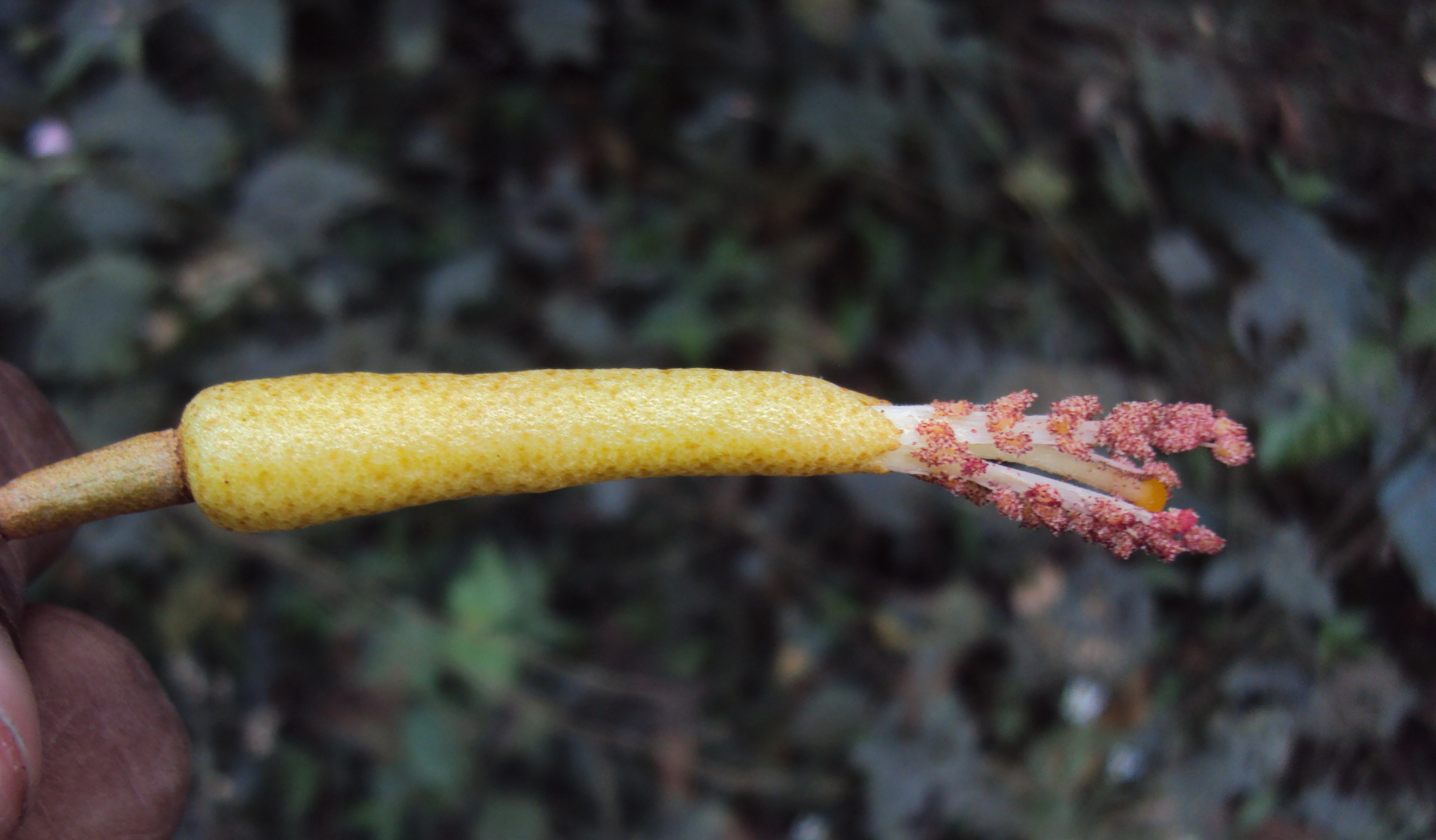
Single flower

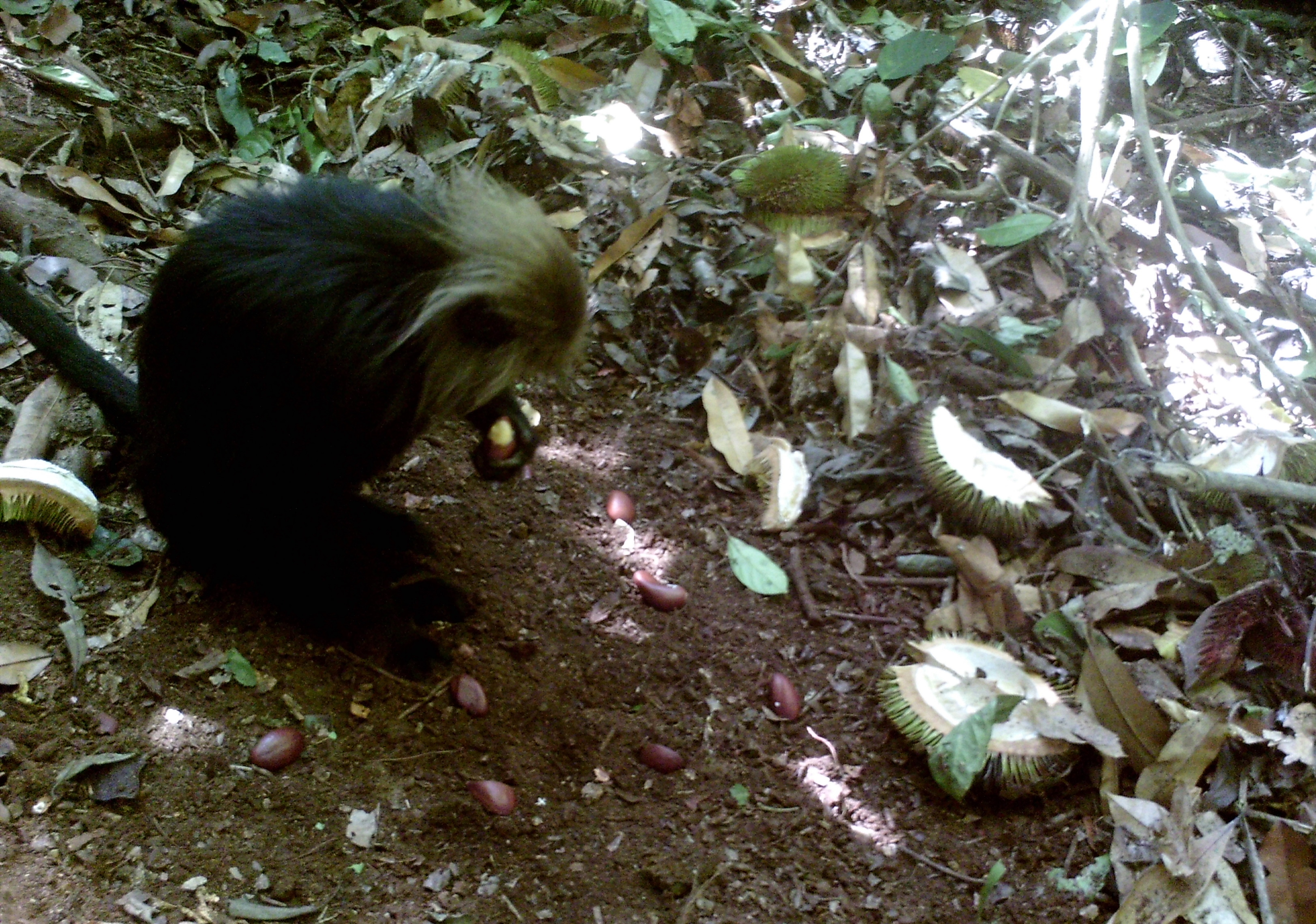
Nilgiri Langur feeding on a Cullenia exarillata seed

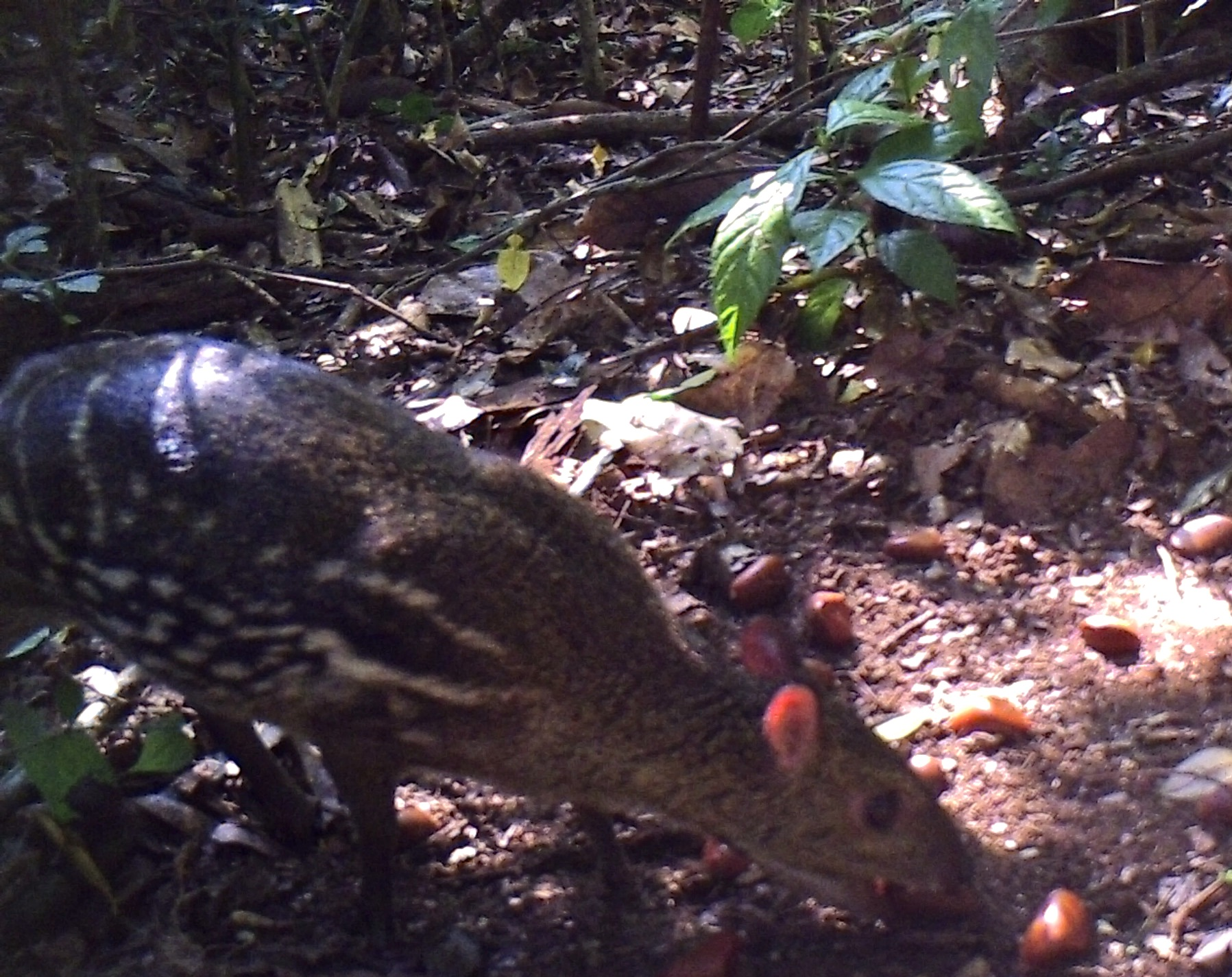
Indian spotted chevrotain feeding on a Cullenia exarillata seed

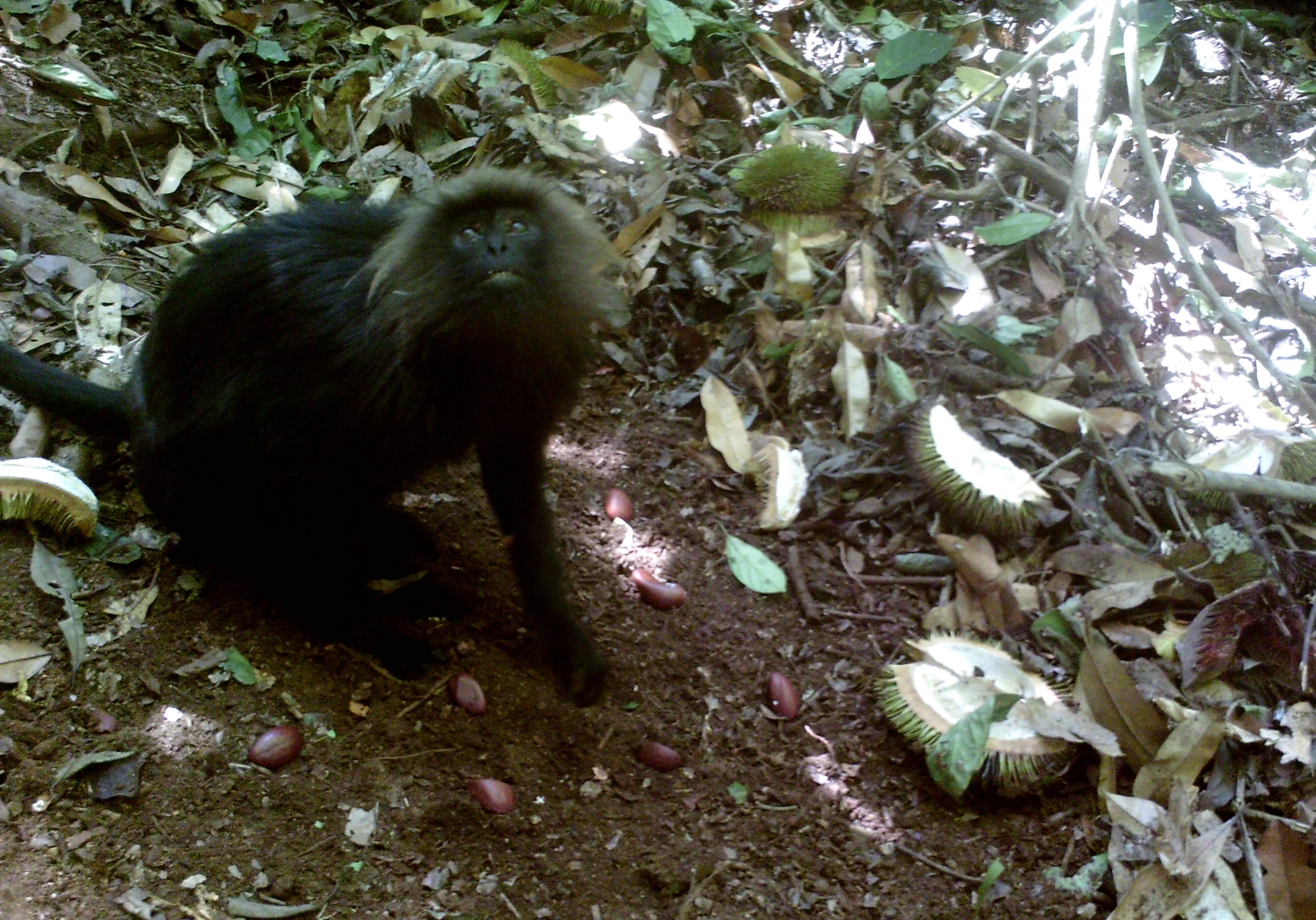
Nilgiri Langur picking a Cullenia exarillata seed

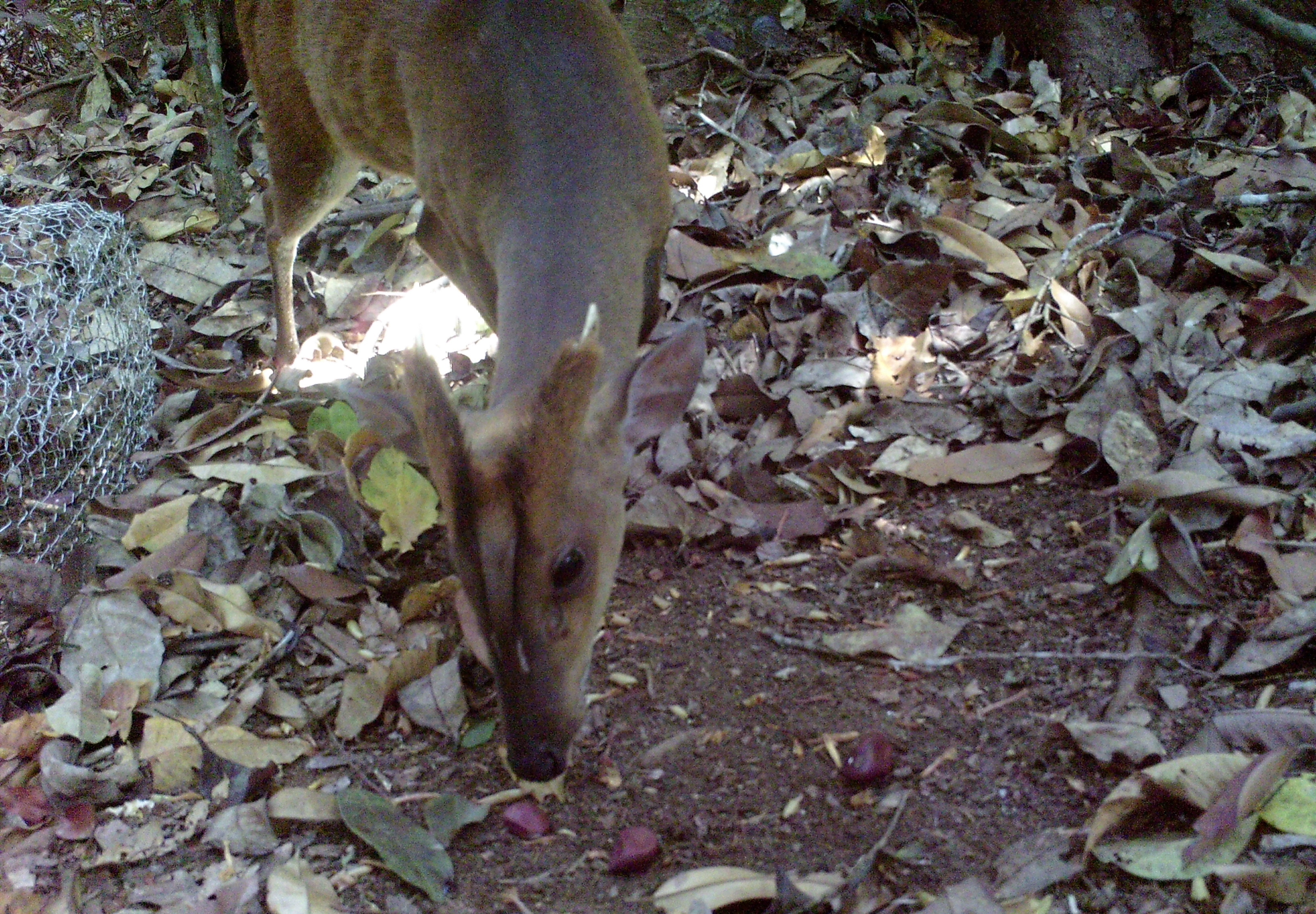
Indian muntjac approaching to feed on a Cullenia exarillata seed

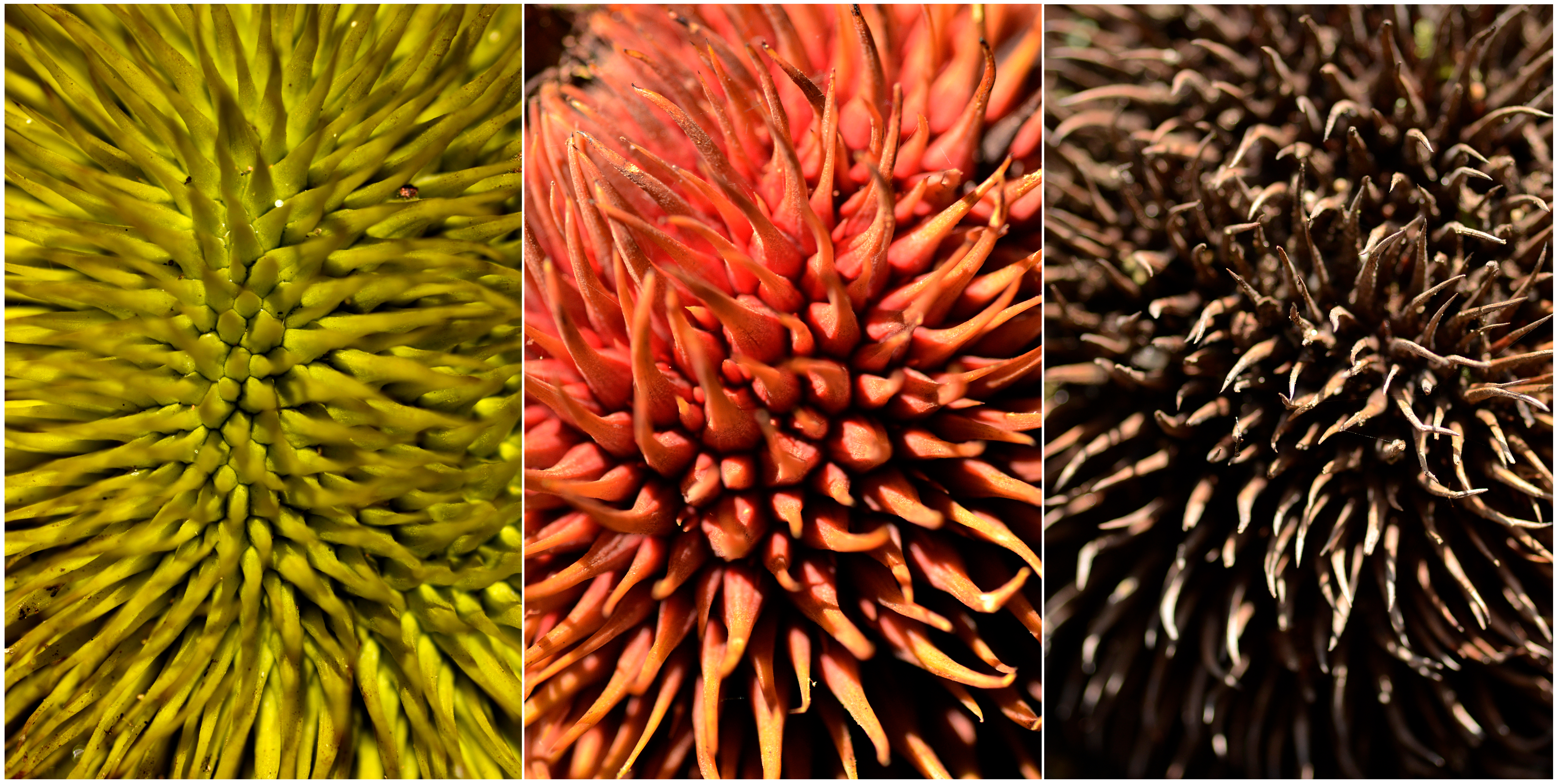
Cullenia exarillata fruit in different stages
