= Cullenia rosayroana =

Conservation status
- Conservation Dependent (IUCN 2.3)

Scientific classification
- Kingdom: Plantae
- Clade: Tracheophytes
- Clade: Angiosperms
- Clade: Eudicots
- Clade: Rosids
- Order: Malvales
- Family: Malvaceae
- Genus: Cullenia
- Species: C. rosayroana

Binomial name
- Cullenia rosayroana Kosterm.

Synonyms
- Durio rosayroanus (Kosterm.) ined.

Species of flowering plant

Cullenia rosayroana is a species of flowering plant in the family Malvaceae. It is endemic to Sri Lanka.
