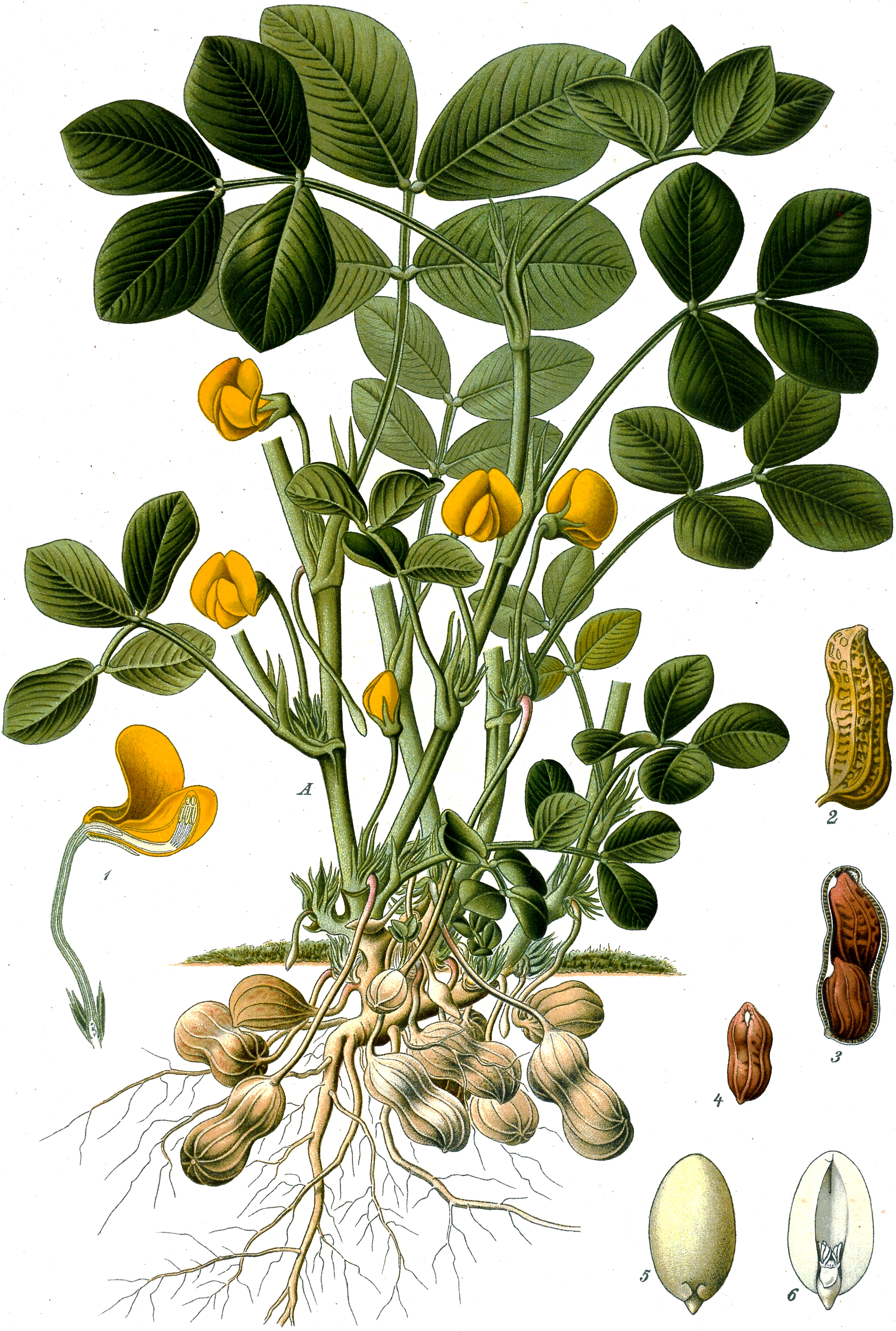

Scientific classification
- Kingdom: Plantae
- Clade: Tracheophytes
- Clade: Angiosperms
- Clade: Eudicots
- Clade: Rosids
- Order: Fabales
- Family: Fabaceae
- Subfamily: Faboideae
- Genus: Arachis
- Species: A. hypogaea

Binomial name
- Arachis hypogaea L.

Subspecies and varieties
- subsp. fastigiata Waldron; var. aequatoriana Krapov. & W. C. Greg; var. fastigiata (Waldron) Krapov. & W. C. Greg; var. peruviana Krapov. & W. C. Greg; var. vulgaris Harz; subsp. hypogaea L.; var. hirsuta J. Kohler; var. hypogaea L.

Synonyms
- Arachis nambyquarae Hoehne; Lathyrus esquirolii H. Lév.

= Peanut =

Legume cultivated as a grain and oil crop

The peanut (Arachis hypogaea), also known as the groundnut, (Note: One of the original names, along with ground pea.) goober (US, via Kikongo), goober pea, pindar (US, via Kikongo) or monkey nut (UK), is a legume crop grown mainly for its edible seeds, contained in underground pods. It is widely grown in the tropics and subtropics by small and large commercial producers, both as a grain legume and as an oil crop. Underground fruiting (geocarpy) is atypical among legumes, which led botanist Carl Linnaeus to name the species hypogaea, from Greek 'under the earth'.

The peanut belongs to the flowering plant family Fabaceae (or Leguminosae), commonly known as the pea family, and is native to South America. Like most other legumes, peanuts harbor symbiotic nitrogen-fixing bacteria in root nodules, which improve soil fertility, making them valuable in crop rotations.

Edible products include peanut oil and peanut butter. Peanut sauces are used in Latin America, West Africa, and Southeast Asia, while in the Indian subcontinent, they are added to salads and stews. In North America, peanuts are used in candies, cakes, and cookies, while peanut butter is widely eaten. Some people are allergic to peanuts and can have a fatal reaction.

The plant tops are used for silage, while oilcake meal is used as animal feed and as a fertilizer. Industrial uses include paint, varnish, and furniture polish made with peanut oil.

== Botanical description ==
Arachis hypogaea was described by Carl Linnaeus in his Species Plantarum in 1753. It is an annual herbaceous plant growing 30 to 50 centimetres (12 to 20 in) tall. It belongs to the botanical family Fabaceae, also known as Leguminosae, and commonly known as the legume, bean, or pea family. Like other legumes, peanuts harbor symbiotic nitrogen-fixing bacteria in their root nodules.

The leaves are opposite and pinnate with four leaflets (two opposite pairs; no terminal leaflet); each leaflet is 1 to 7 cm (1/2 to 2 3/4 in) long and 1 to 3 cm (1/2 to 1 1/4 in) across. Like those of many other legumes, the leaves are nyctinastic; that is, they have "sleep" movements, closing at night. The flowers are 1 to 1.5 cm (3/8 to 5/8 in) across, and yellowish orange with reddish veining. They are borne in axillary clusters on the stems.

Peanut fruits develop underground, an unusual feature known as geocarpy. After fertilization, a short stalk at the base of the ovary—often termed a gynophore, but which appears to be part of the ovary—elongates to form a thread-like structure known as a "peg". This peg grows into the soil, allowing the fruit to develop underground. These pods, technically called legumes, are 3 to 7 centimetres (1 to 3 in) long, normally containing one to four seeds. The shell of the peanut fruit consists primarily of a mesocarp with several large veins traversing its length. Botanically they are not nuts ("fruit whose ovary wall becomes hard at maturity").

Peanuts contain polyphenols, polyunsaturated and monounsaturated fats, phytosterols, and dietary fiber in amounts similar to several tree nuts. Peanut skins contain resveratrol.

Botany

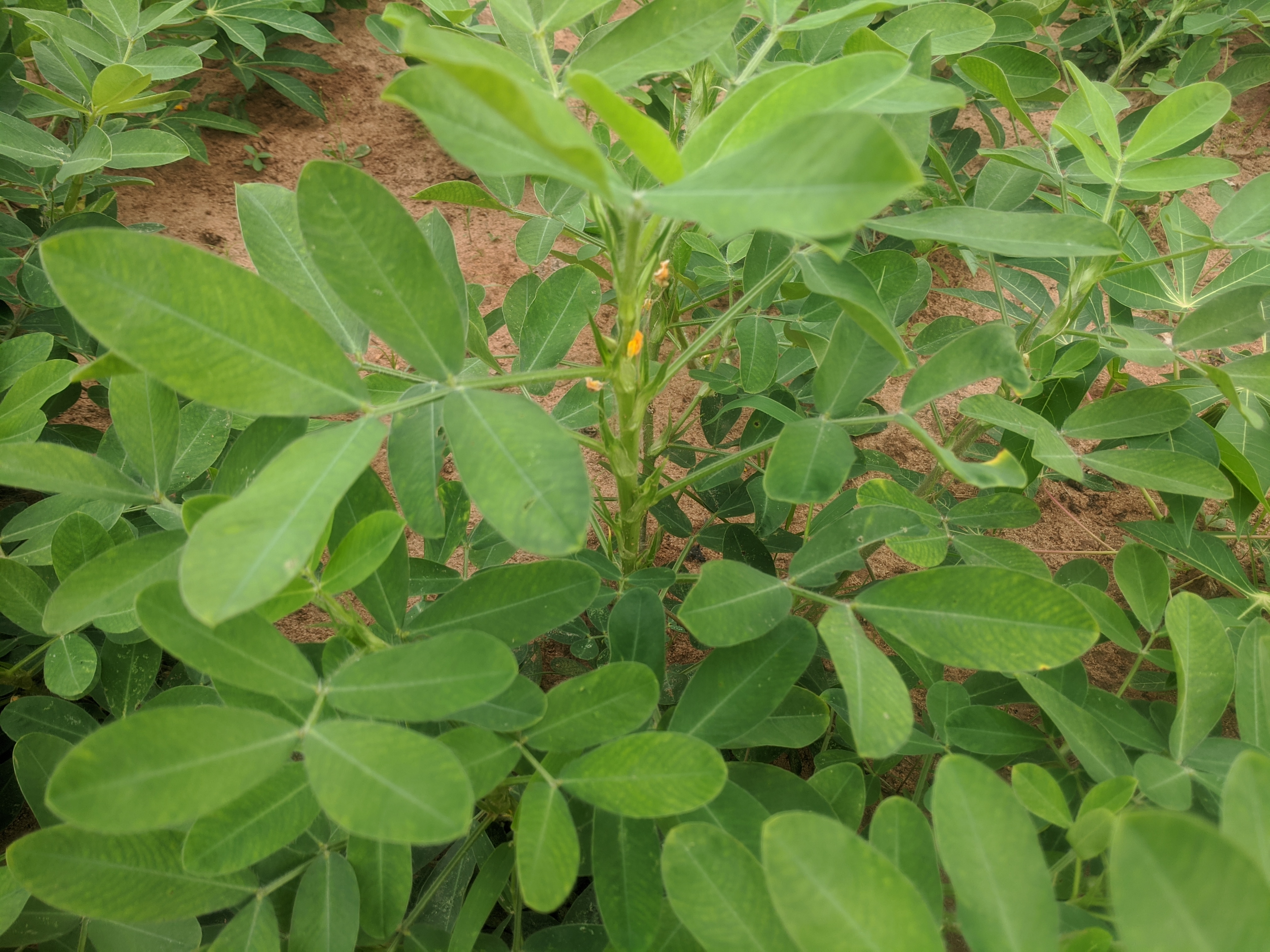
Plant

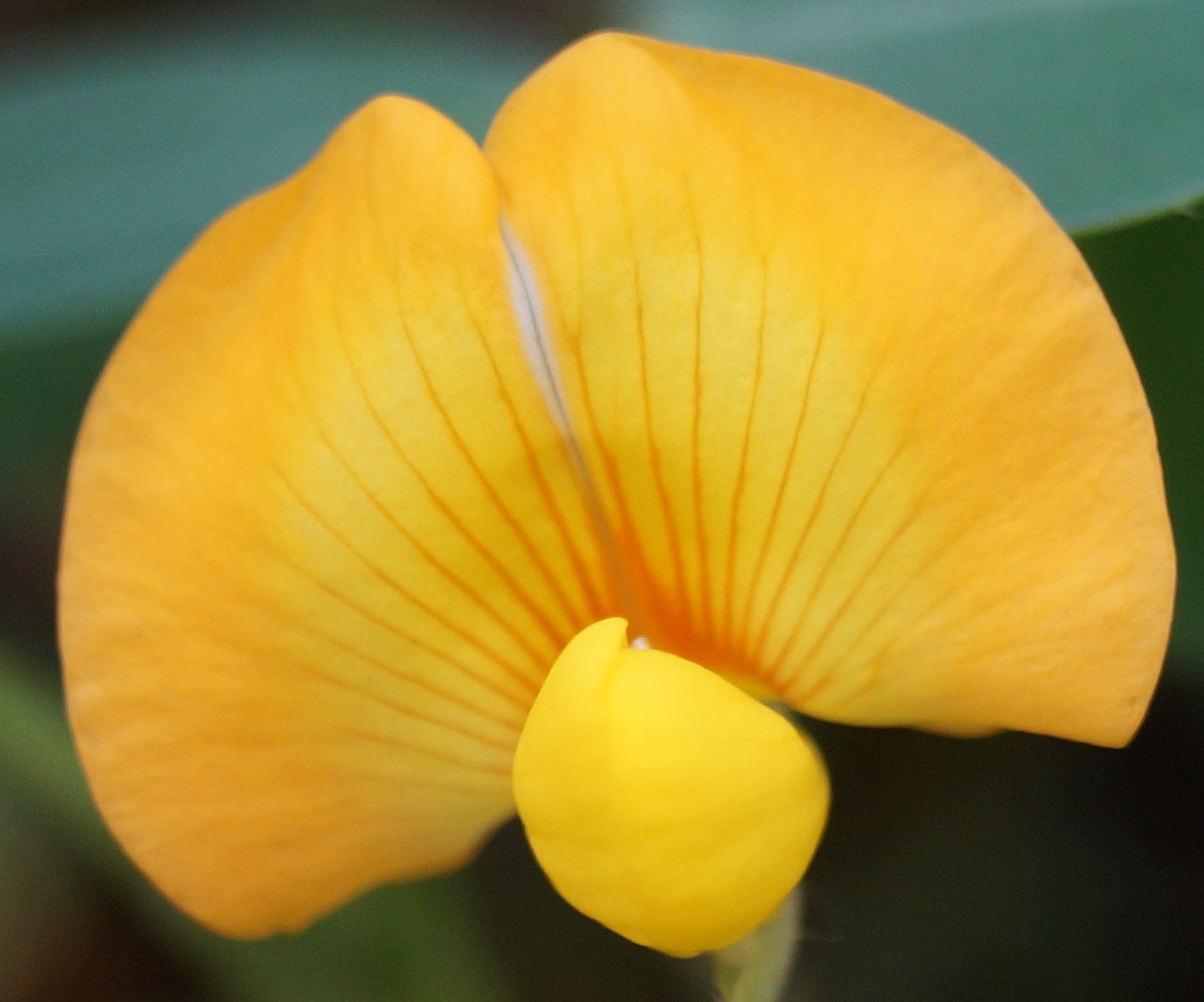
Flower

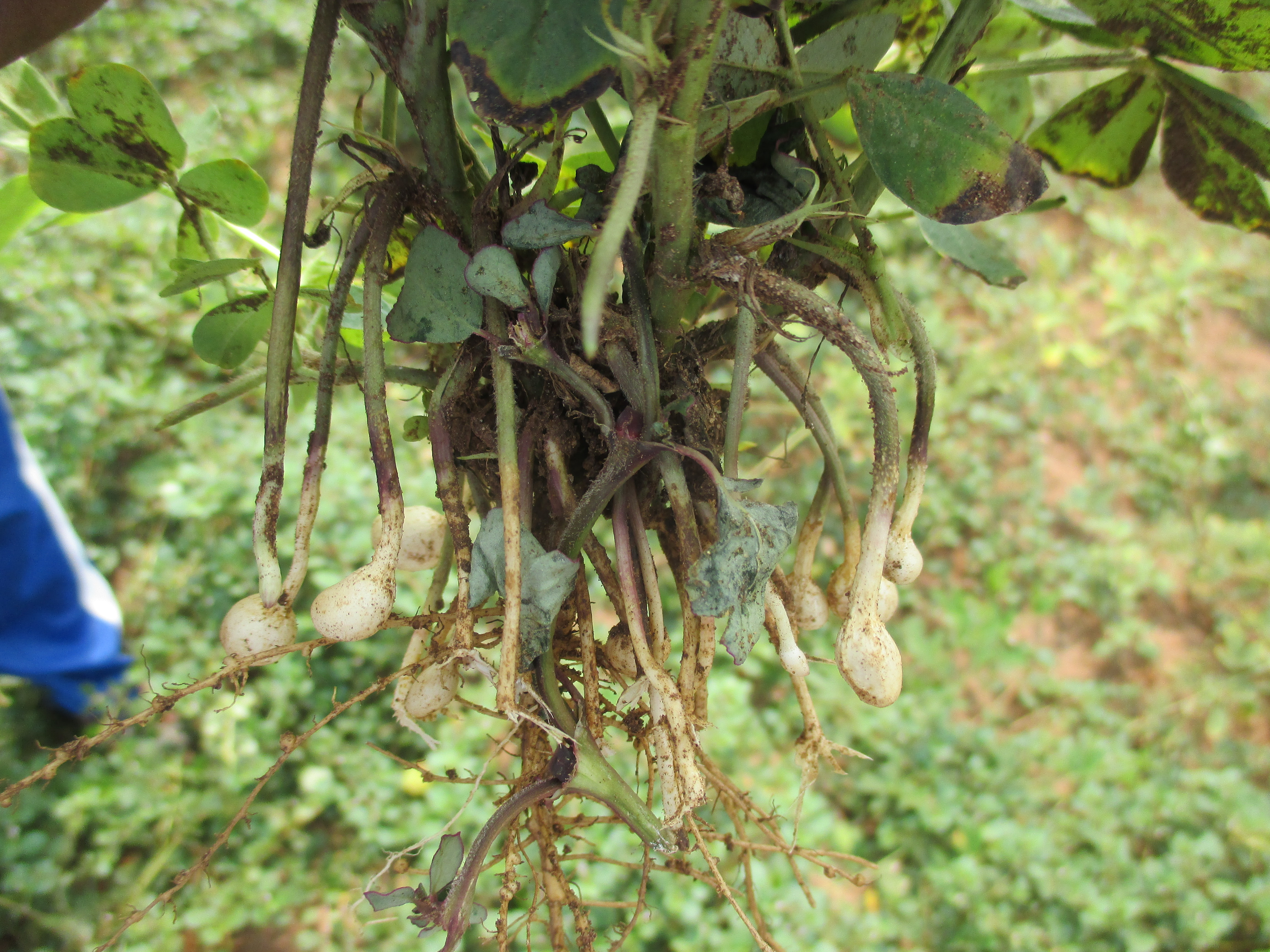
Developing fruits (pods)

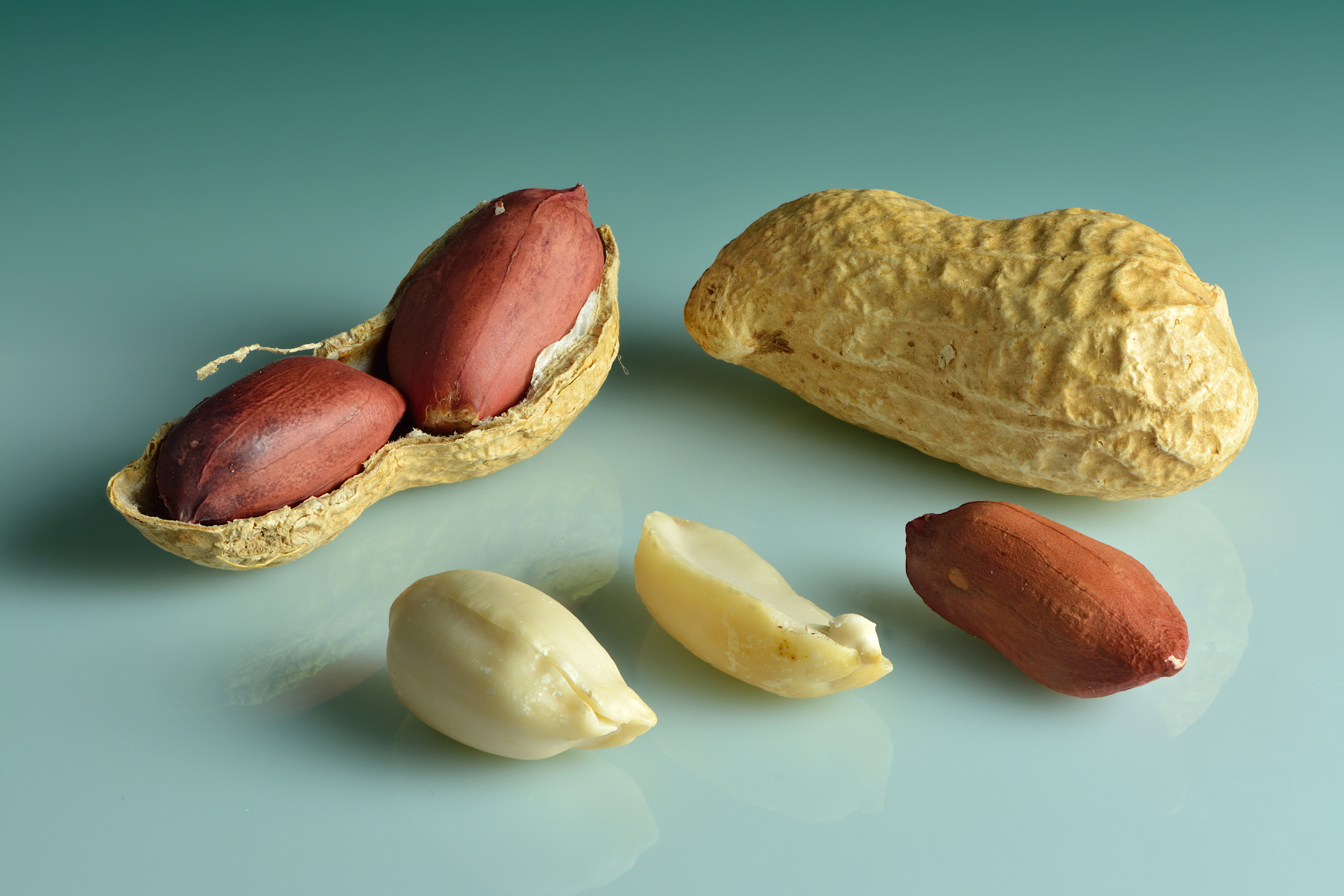
Fruits (pods) and seeds

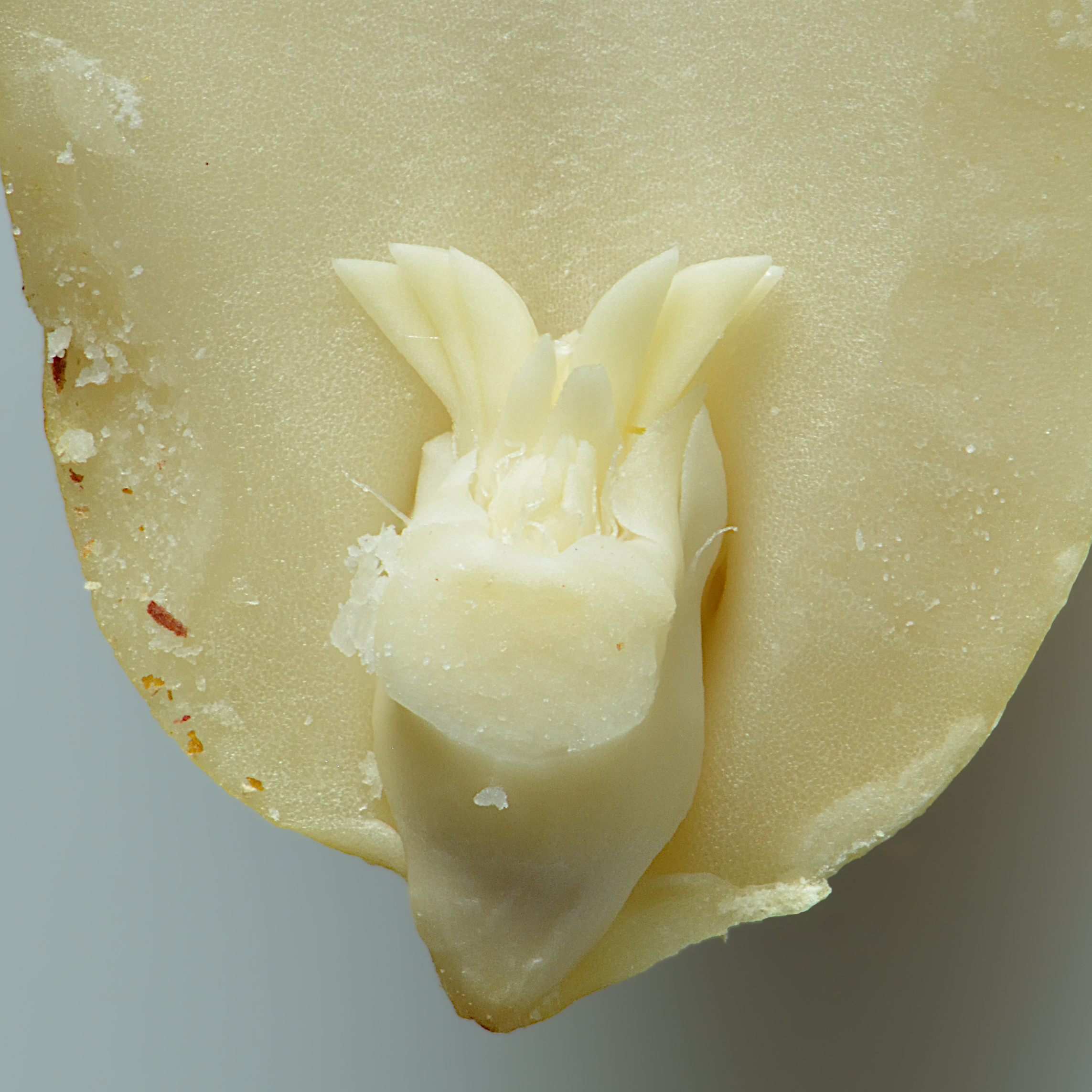
Half of seed, showing a cotyledon, plumule, and radicle

== History ==
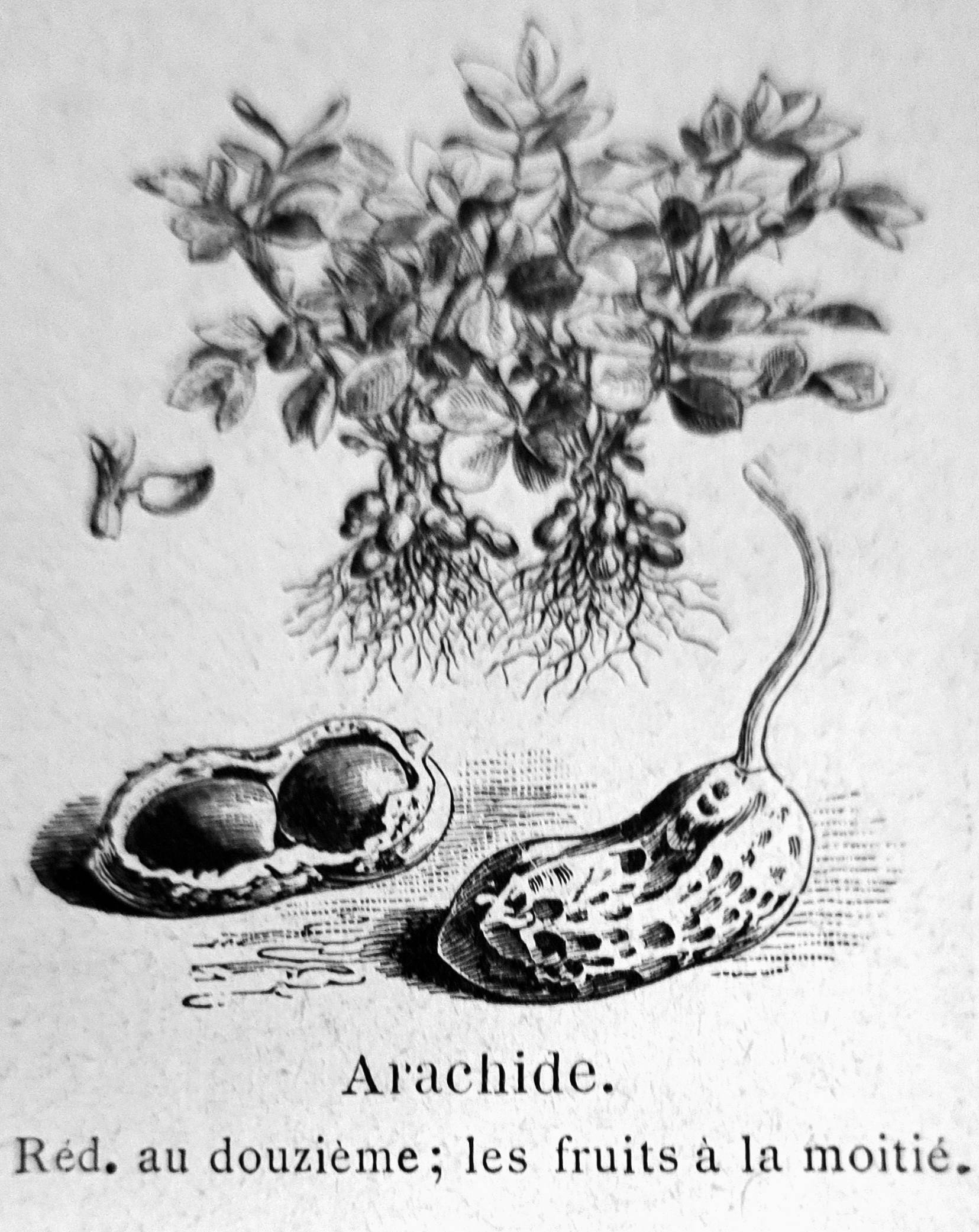
Illustration of a peanut plant and pods with seeds in Les plantes potagères, Vilmorin-Andrieux, 1903

The Arachis genus is native to South America, east of the Andes, around Peru, Bolivia, Argentina, and Brazil. Cultivated peanuts (A. hypogaea) arose from a hybrid between two wild species of peanut, thought to be A. duranensis and A. ipaensis. The initial hybrid would have been sterile, but spontaneous chromosome doubling restored its fertility, forming what is termed an amphidiploid or allotetraploid. Genetic analysis suggests the hybridization may have occurred only once and gave rise to A. monticola, a wild form of peanut that occurs in a few limited locations in northwestern Argentina, or in southeastern Bolivia, where the peanut landraces with the most wild-like features are grown today, and by artificial selection to A. hypogaea.

The process of domestication through artificial selection made A. hypogaea dramatically different from its wild relatives. The domesticated plants are bushier, more compact, and have a different pod structure and larger seeds. From this center of origin, cultivation spread and formed secondary and tertiary centers of diversity in Peru, Ecuador, Brazil, Paraguay, and Uruguay. Over time, thousands of peanut landraces evolved; these are classified into six botanical varieties and two subspecies (as listed in the peanut scientific classification table). Subspecies A. h. fastigiata types are more upright in their growth habit and have shorter crop cycles. Subspecies A. h. hypogaea types spread more on the ground and have longer crop cycles.

The oldest known archeological remains of pods have been dated at about 7,600 years old, possibly a wild species that was in cultivation, or A. hypogaea in the early phase of domestication. They were found in Peru, where dry climatic conditions are favorable for the preservation of organic material. Almost certainly, peanut cultivation predated this at the center of origin where the climate is moister. Many pre-Columbian cultures, such as the Moche, depicted peanuts in their art. Cultivation was well-established in Mesoamerica before the Spanish arrived. There, the conquistadors found the tlālcacahuatl (the plant's Nahuatl name, hence the name in Spanish cacahuate) offered for sale in the marketplace of Tenochtitlan. Its cultivation was introduced in Europe in the 19th century through Spain, particularly Valencia, where it is still produced, albeit marginally. European traders later spread the peanut worldwide, and cultivation is now widespread in tropical and subtropical regions. In West Africa, it substantially replaced a crop plant from the same family, the Bambara groundnut, whose seed pods also develop underground.

Peanuts were introduced to the U.S. during the colonial period and grown as a garden crop. Starting in 1870, they were used as an animal feedstock until human consumption grew in the 1930s. George Washington Carver (1864–1943) championed the peanut as part of his efforts for agricultural extension in the American South, where soils were depleted after repeated plantings of cotton. He invented and promulgated hundreds of peanut-based products, including cosmetics, paints, plastics, gasoline and nitroglycerin.

Peanut butter was first manufactured in Canada by a process patented in the U.S. in 1884 by Marcellus Gilmore Edson of Montreal. Peanuts were sold in North America at fairs or by pushcart operators throughout the 19th century. Peanut butter became well known in the United States after the Beech-Nut company began selling it at the St. Louis World's Fair in 1904. The U.S. Department of Agriculture initiated a program to encourage agricultural production and human consumption of peanuts in the late 19th and early 20th centuries.

== Cultivation ==
=== Agronomy ===
World distribution map. Areas are political and may exceed the actual area under cultivation. Key: Green=Natural range; Purple=Introduced.

Peanuts grow best in light, sandy loam soil with a pH of 5.9–7. Their capacity to fix nitrogen means that providing they nodulate properly, peanuts benefit little or not at all from nitrogen-containing fertilizer, and they improve soil fertility. Therefore, they are valuable in crop rotations. Also, the yield of the peanut crop itself is increased in rotations through reduced diseases, pests, and weeds. For example, in Texas, peanuts in a three-year rotation with corn yield 50% more than non-rotated peanuts. Adequate levels of phosphorus, potassium, calcium, magnesium, and micronutrients are also necessary for good yields. Peanuts need warm weather throughout the growing season to develop well. They can be grown with as little as 350 mm (14 in) of water, but for best yields need at least 500 mm (20 in). Depending on growing conditions and the cultivar of peanut, harvest is usually 90 to 130 days after planting for subspecies A. h. fastigiata types, and 120 to 150 days after planting for subspecies A. h. hypogaea types.

Peanut plants continue to produce flowers when pods are developing; therefore, some pods are immature even when they are ready for harvest. To maximize yield, the timing of harvest is important. If it is too early, too many pods will be unripe; if too late, the pods will snap off at the stalk and remain in the soil. For harvesting, the entire plant, including most of the roots, is removed from the soil.

The main yield-limiting factors in semi-arid regions are drought and high-temperature stress. The stages of reproductive development before flowering, at flowering, and at early pod development are particularly sensitive to these constraints. Apart from nitrogen, phosphorus and potassium, other nutrient deficiencies causing significant yield losses are calcium, iron and boron. Biotic stresses mainly include pests, diseases, and weeds. Among insects pests, pod borers, aphids, and mites are of importance. The most important diseases are leaf spots, rusts, and the toxin-producing fungus Aspergillus.

In mechanized systems, a machine is used to cut off the main root of the peanut plant by cutting through the soil just below the level of the peanut pods. The machine lifts the "bush" from the ground, shakes it, then inverts it, leaving the plant upside down to keep the peanuts out of the soil. This allows the peanuts to dry slowly to a little less than a third of their original moisture level over three to four days. Traditionally, peanuts were pulled and inverted by hand. After the peanuts have dried sufficiently, they are threshed, removing the peanut pods from the rest of the bush.

Cultivation

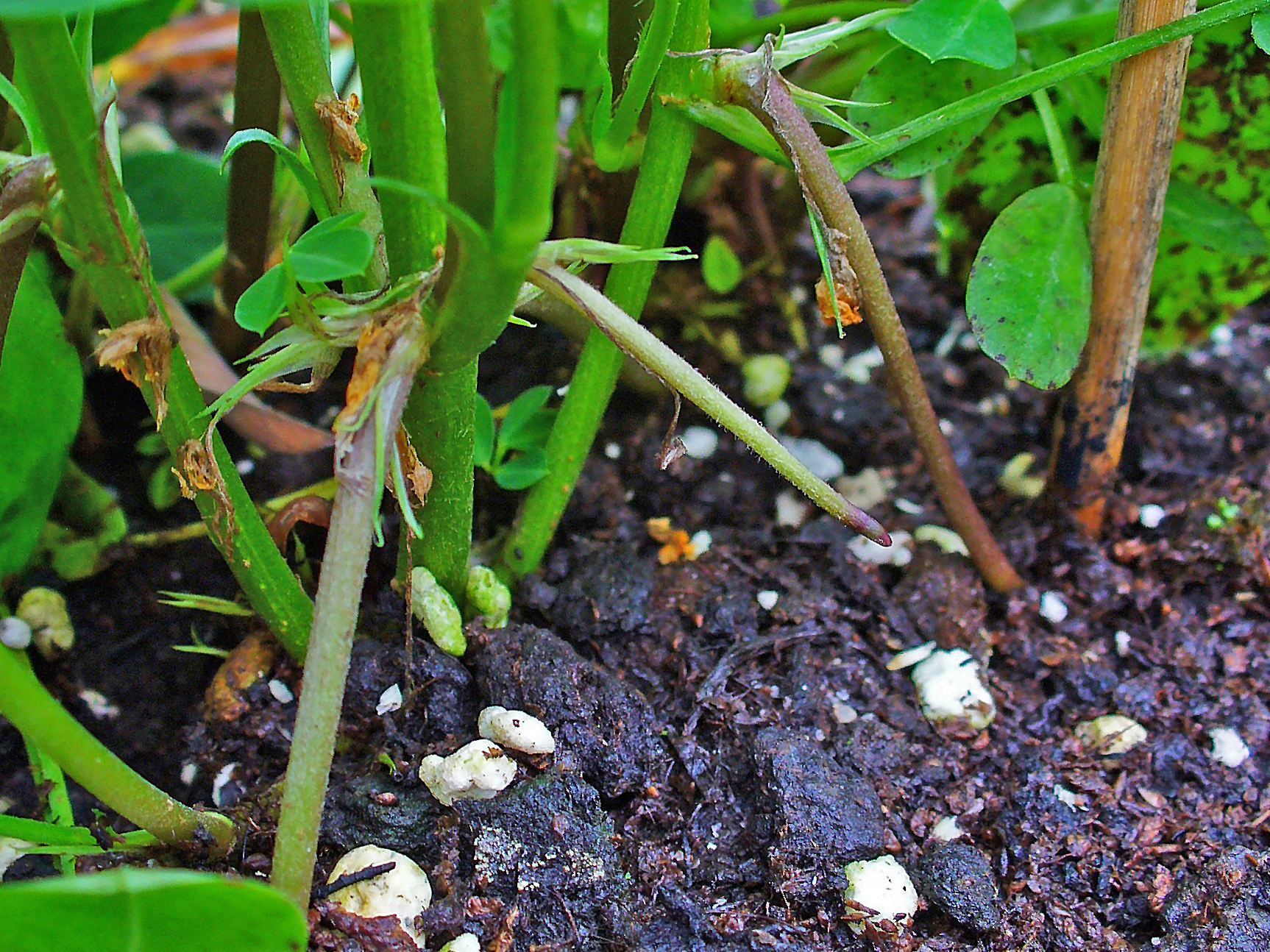
Pegs growing into the soil. The buried tip of the peg develops into a fruit.

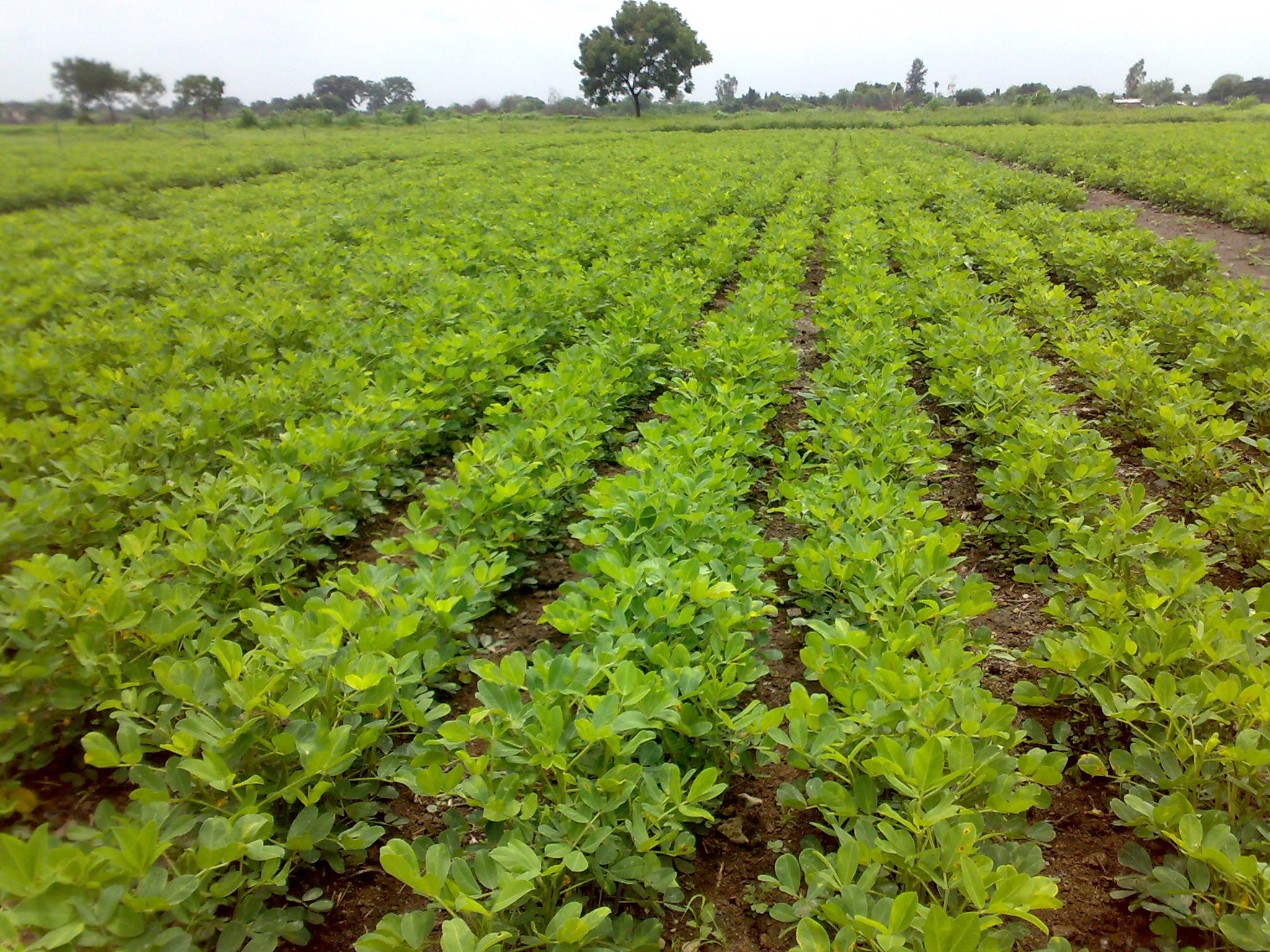
Cultivation at the Directorate of Groundnut Research, Gujarat, India, 2009

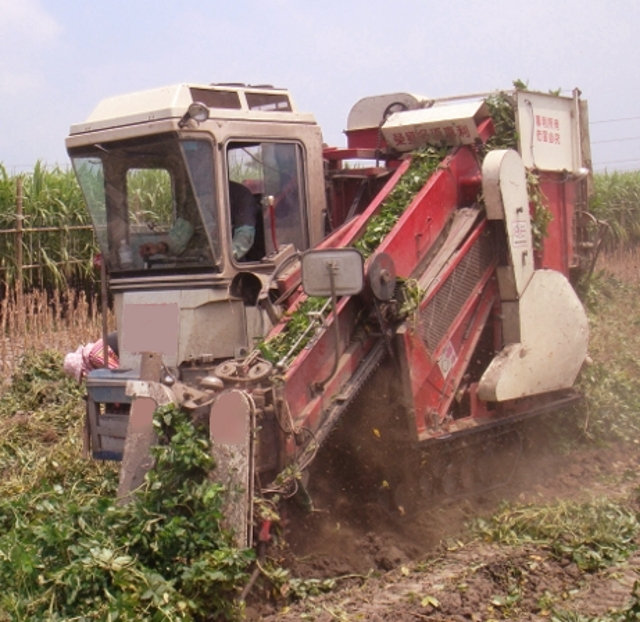
Track-type peanut harvester

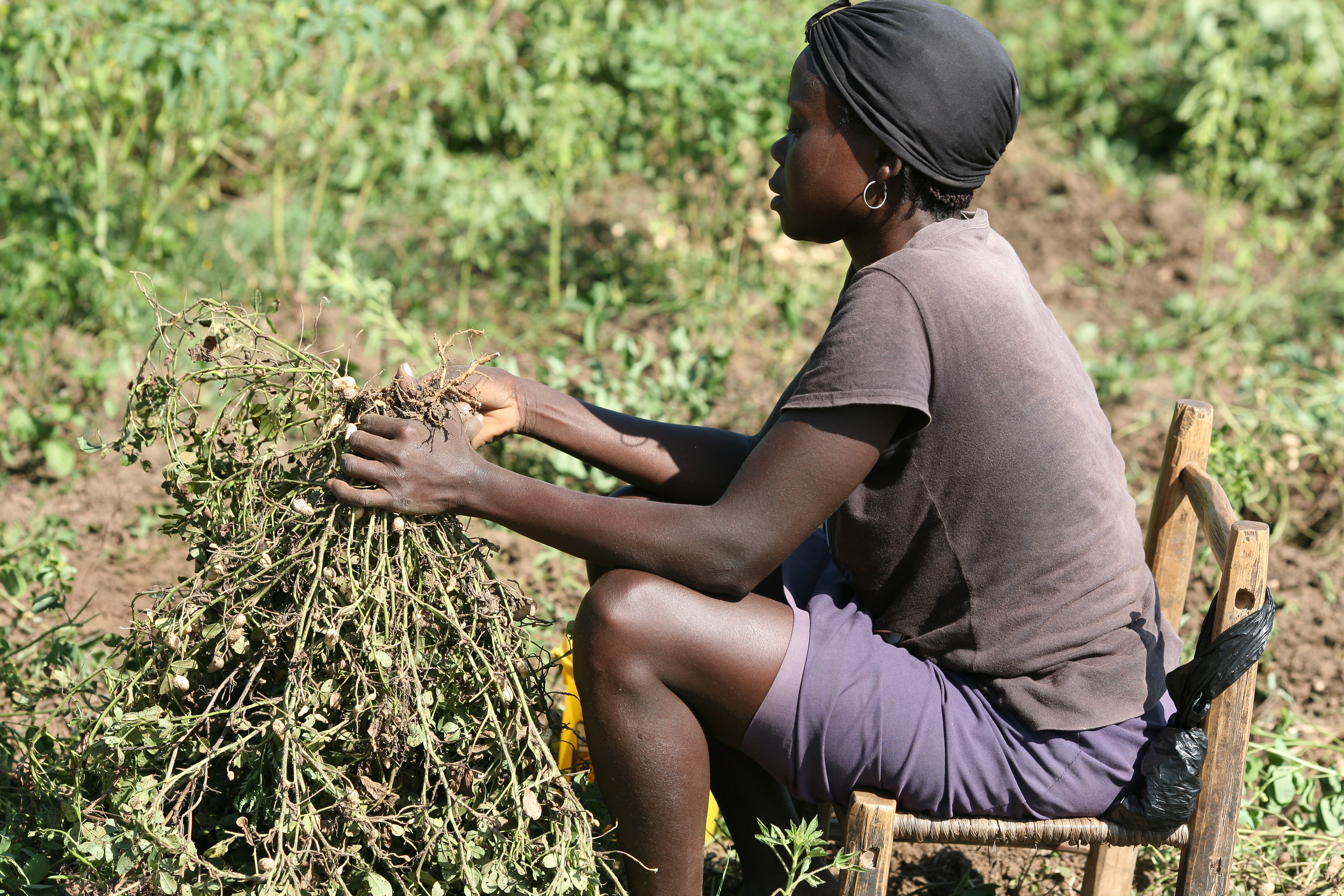
Harvesting peanuts by hand (Haiti, 2012)

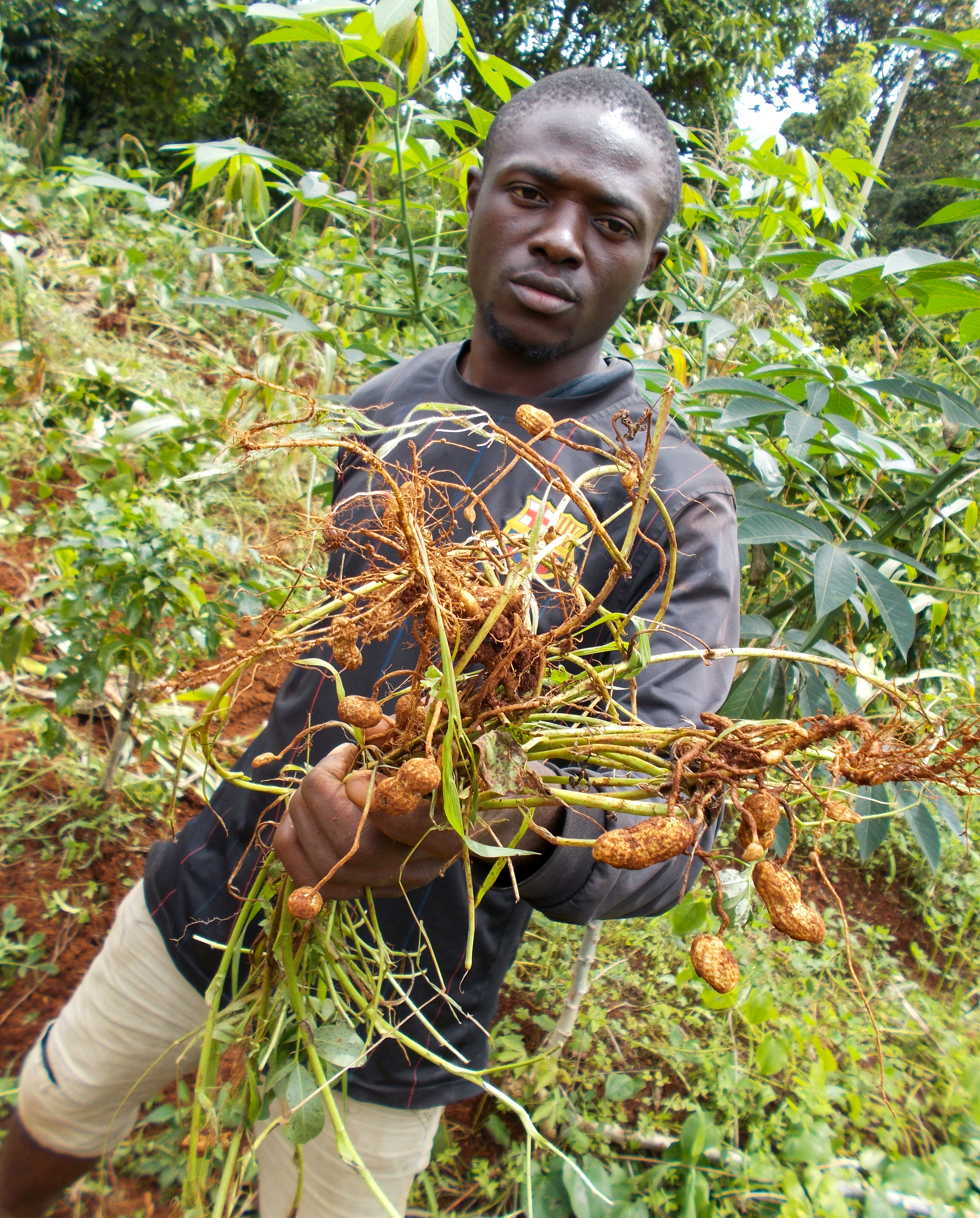
Harvest, Cameroon, 2016

=== Varieties ===
There are many peanut cultivars grown around the world. The market classes grown in the United States are Spanish, Runner, Virginia, and Valencia. Peanuts are produced in three major areas of the U.S.: the southeastern region which includes Alabama, Georgia, and Florida; the southwestern region which includes New Mexico, Oklahoma, and Texas; and in the general eastern U.S. which includes Virginia, North Carolina, and South Carolina. In Georgia, Naomi Chapman Woodroof is responsible for developing the breeding program of peanuts, resulting in a harvest almost five times greater.

The small Spanish types are grown in South Africa and the southwestern and southeastern United States. Until 1940, 90% of the peanuts grown in the U.S. state of Georgia were Spanish types, but the trend since then has been larger-seeded, higher-yielding, more disease-resistant cultivars. Spanish peanuts have a higher oil content than other types of peanuts. In the U.S., the Spanish group is primarily grown in New Mexico, Oklahoma, and Texas.

=== Pests and diseases ===
If peanut plants are subjected to severe drought during pod formation, or if pods are not properly stored, they may become contaminated with the mold Aspergillus flavus which may produce carcinogenic aflatoxins. Lower-quality and moldy peanuts are more likely to be contaminated. The USDA tests every truckload of raw peanuts for aflatoxin; any containing more than 15 parts per billion are destroyed. The industry has manufacturing steps to ensure all peanuts are inspected for aflatoxin. Peanuts tested to have high aflatoxin are used to make peanut oil where the mold can be removed. The plant leaves can be affected by a fungus, Alternaria arachidis.

== Production ==
Peanut production 2023, millions of tonnes
China	19.2
India	10.3
Nigeria	4.3
United States	2.7
Sudan	1.4
World	54.3
Source: FAOSTAT of the United Nations

In 2023, world production of peanuts (reported as groundnuts excluding shelled) was 54 million tonnes, led by China with 36% of the total and India with 19% (table).

== Allergies ==
Some people (1.4–2% in Europe and the United States) experience allergic reactions to peanut exposure; symptoms range from watery eyes to anaphylactic shock. The hygiene hypothesis of allergy states that a lack of early childhood exposure to infectious agents like germs and parasites could be causing the increase in food allergies. Delaying exposure to peanuts in childhood can greatly increase the risk of developing allergy. Peanut allergy has been associated with the use of skin preparations containing peanut oil among children, but the evidence is inconclusive. Peanut allergies are associated with family history and intake of soy products. Refined peanut oil does not cause allergic reactions in most people with peanut allergies. However, crude (unrefined) peanut oils contain protein, which may cause allergic reactions.

Some school districts in the U.S. and elsewhere have banned peanuts and products containing them. However, a 2015 study in Canada found no difference in the percentage of accidental exposures occurring in schools prohibiting peanuts compared to schools allowing them.

== Uses ==
=== Nutrition ===
Peanuts, valencia, raw
Nutritional value per 100 g (3.5 oz)
- Energy: 2,385 kJ (570 kcal)
- Carbohydrates: 21 g
- Dietary fiber: 9 g
- Fat: 48 g
- Saturated: 7 g
- Monounsaturated: 24 g
- Polyunsaturated: 16 g
- Protein: 25 g
Amino acids
Tryptophan	0.2445 g
Threonine	0.859 g
Isoleucine	0.882 g
Leucine	1.627 g
Lysine	0.901 g
Methionine	0.308 g
Cystine	0.322 g
Phenylalanine	1.300 g
Tyrosine	1.020 g
Valine	1.052 g
Arginine	3.001 g
Histidine	0.634 g
Alanine	0.997 g
Aspartic acid	3.060 g
Glutamic acid	5.243 g
Glycine	1.512 g
Proline	1.107 g
Serine	1.236 g
Vitamins and minerals
Vitamins	Quantity %DV^{†}
Thiamine (B1)	50% 0.6 mg
Riboflavin (B2)	23% 0.3 mg
Niacin (B3)	81% 12.9 mg
Pantothenic acid (B5)	36% 1.8 mg
Vitamin B6	18% 0.3 mg
Folate (B9)	62% 246 μg
Vitamin C	0% 0.0 mg
Vitamin E	44% 6.6 mg
Minerals	Quantity %DV^{†}
Calcium	5% 62 mg
Iron	11% 2 mg
Magnesium	44% 184 mg
Manganese	87% 2.0 mg
Phosphorus	27% 336 mg
Potassium	11% 332 mg
Selenium	13% 7.3 μg
Sodium	0% 1 mg
Zinc	30% 3.3 mg
- Other constituents: Quantity
- Water: 4.26 g
- Link to full USDA Database entry
- ^{†}Percentages estimated using US recommendations for adults, except for potassium, which is estimated based on expert recommendation from the National Academies.

Raw Valencia peanuts are 4% water, 48% fat, 25% protein, and 21% carbohydrates (table).

In a reference amount of 100 grams (3.5 oz), peanuts provide 2,385 kilojoules (570 kilocalories) of food energy, supply 9 g (0.32 oz) of dietary fiber, and are a rich source (defined as more than 20% of the Daily Value, DV) of several B vitamins, vitamin E, and various dietary minerals, such as manganese, magnesium, and phosphorus. The fats are mainly polyunsaturated and monounsaturated (83% of total fats when combined; table source).

Some studies show that regular consumption of peanuts is associated with a lower specific risk of mortality from certain diseases. However, the study designs do not allow cause and effect to be inferred. According to the US Food and Drug Administration, "Scientific evidence suggests but does not prove that eating 1.5 ounces per day of most nuts (such as peanuts) as part of a diet low in saturated fat and cholesterol may reduce the risk of heart disease."

=== Countering malnutrition ===
With their high protein concentration, peanuts are used to help reduce or prevent malnutrition. Plumpy Nut, MANA Nutrition, and Medika Mamba are high-protein, high-energy, and high-nutrient peanut-based pastes developed to be used as a therapeutic food by agencies including USAID to help in famine relief in developing countries.

Peanuts can be used like other legumes and grains to make a lactose-free, milk-like beverage, peanut milk, developed as a way to reduce malnutrition among children.

=== Animal feed ===
Peanut plant tops and crop residues can be used for silage. Industrial peanut processing removes the fiber-rich hulls in large amounts; these can feed livestock, particularly ruminants. The oilcake residue from oil processing is used as animal feed and soil fertilizer, usually in meal (powdered) form. It concentrates the non-oil components of peanut seeds and contains some residue oil. Groundnut cake is a livestock feed, mostly used by cattle as protein supplements. It is one of the most important and valuable feeds for all types of livestock and one of the most active ingredients for poultry rations. Poor storage of the cake may sometimes result in its contamination by aflatoxin, a naturally occurring mycotoxin that is produced by Aspergillus flavus and Aspergillus parasiticus. Some peanuts (seeds) can be fed whole to livestock, for example, those over the production quota (such as in the US) or those with a higher aflatoxin content than that permitted by the food regulations but still within the level permitted by animal feed regulations.

== Edible products ==
=== Whole peanuts ===
Dry roasting is a common method of preparation, though the roast flavor is lost more quickly than with oil roasting or blister frying (oil roasting after soaking in water).

Boiled peanuts are a popular snack in India, China, West Africa, and the southern United States. In the U.S. South, boiled peanuts are often prepared in briny water and sold in streetside stands. Fresh "green" peanuts (not dehydrated) are ready for boiling; raw dehydrated peanuts must be rehydrated before boiling (usually in a bowl full of water overnight).

=== Peanut oil ===
Peanut oil is often used in cooking because it has a mild flavor and a relatively high smoke point. Due to its high Monounsaturated fat content, it is considered more healthy than saturated oils and is resistant to rancidity. The several types of peanut oil include aromatic roasted peanut oil, refined peanut oil, extra virgin or cold-pressed peanut oil, and peanut extract. Refined peanut oil is exempt from allergen labeling laws in the U.S.

A common cooking and salad oil, peanut oil is 46% monounsaturated fats (primarily oleic acid), 32% polyunsaturated fats (primarily linoleic acid), and 17% saturated fats (primarily palmitic acid) (source in nutrition table). Extractable from whole peanuts using a simple water and centrifugation method, the oil is being considered by NASA's Advanced Life Support program for future long-duration human space missions.

=== Peanut butter ===
Peanut butter is a food paste or spread made from ground dry roasted peanuts. It often contains additional ingredients that modify the taste or texture, such as salt, sweeteners, or emulsifiers. Many companies have added twists on traditionally plain peanut butter by adding various flavor varieties, such as chocolate, birthday cake, and cinnamon raisin. Peanut butter is served as a spread on bread, toast or crackers, and used to make sandwiches (notably the peanut butter and jelly sandwich). It is also used in a number of confections, such as peanut-flavored granola bars or croissants and other pastries. The United States is a leading exporter of peanut butter, and itself consumes $800 million of peanut butter annually.

=== Peanut flour ===
Peanut flour is used in gluten-free cooking.

=== Peanut proteins ===
Peanut protein concentrates and isolates are commercially produced from defatted peanut flour using several methods. Peanut flour concentrates (about 70% protein) are produced from dehulled kernels by removing most of the oil and the water-soluble, non-protein components. Hydraulic pressing, screw pressing, solvent extraction, and pre-pressing followed by solvent extraction may be used for oil removal, after which protein isolation and purification are implemented.

Edible products

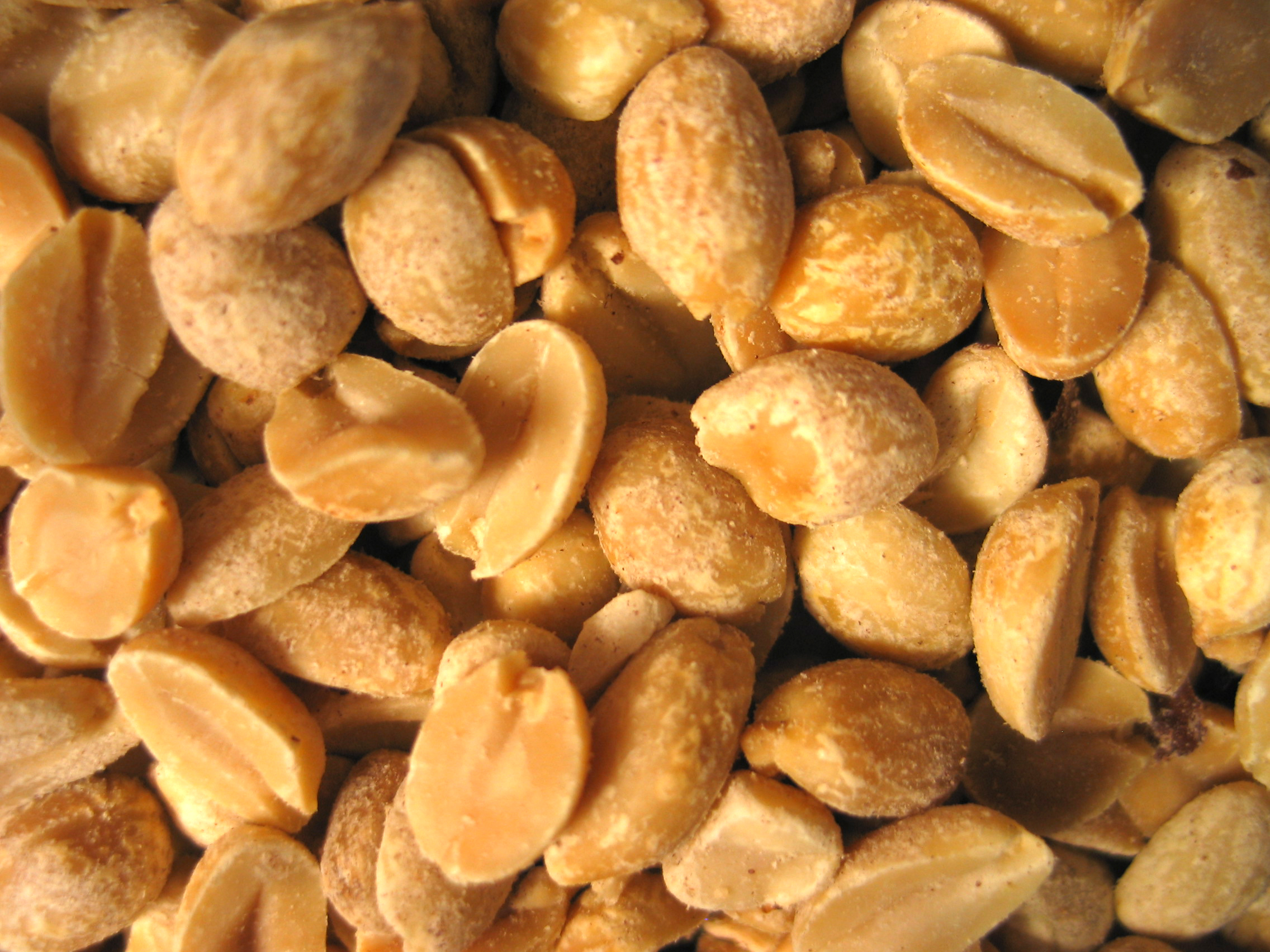
Roasted peanuts as snack food

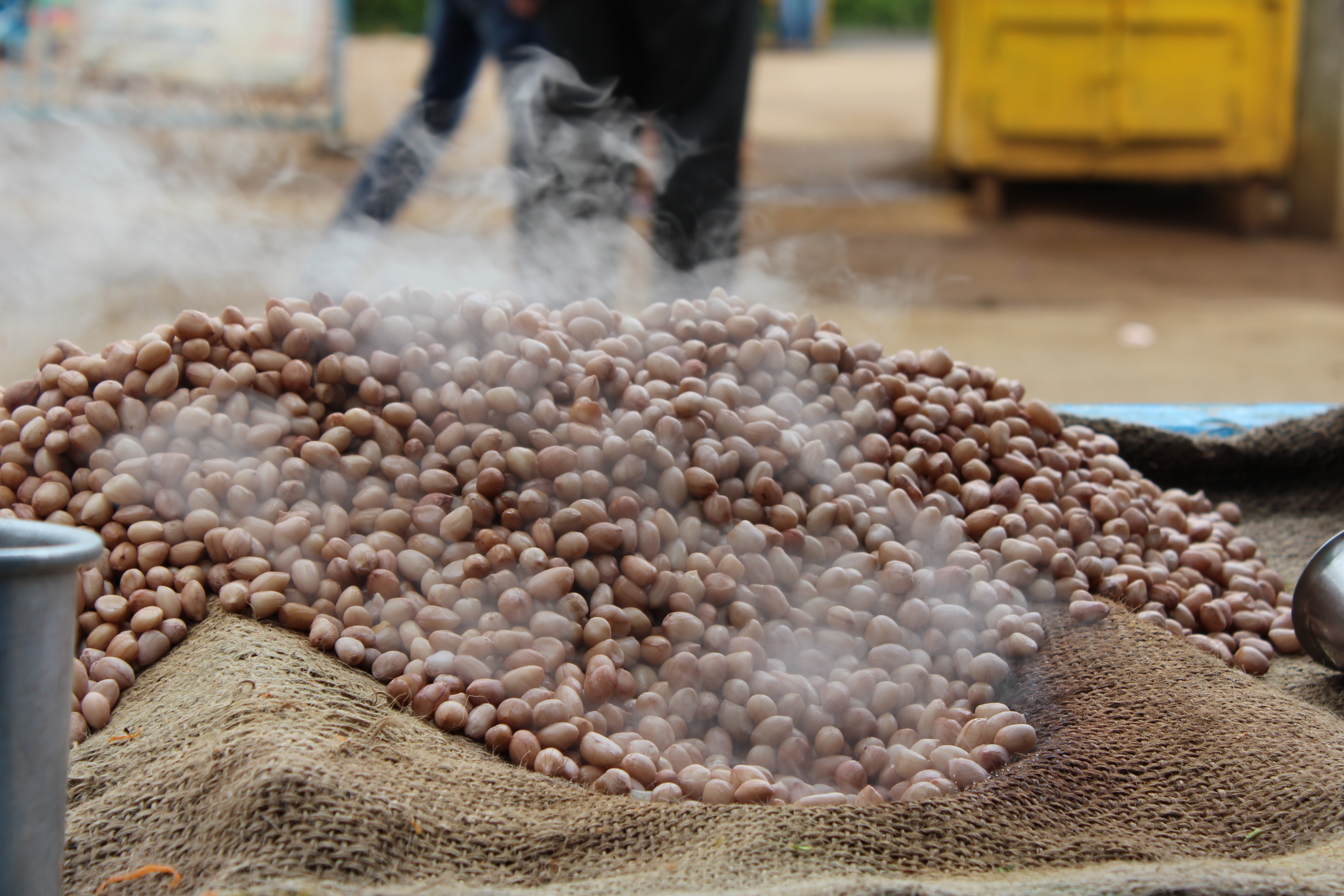
Roasting of peanuts in India

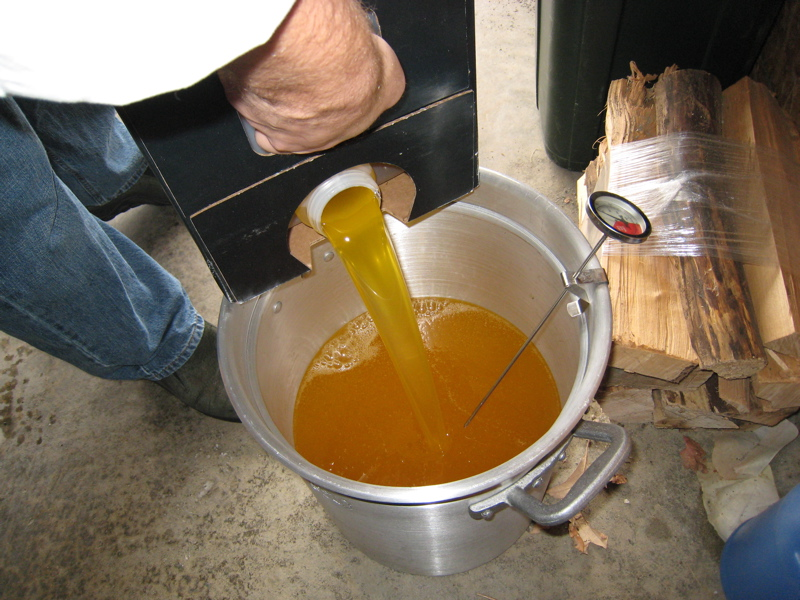
Peanut oil

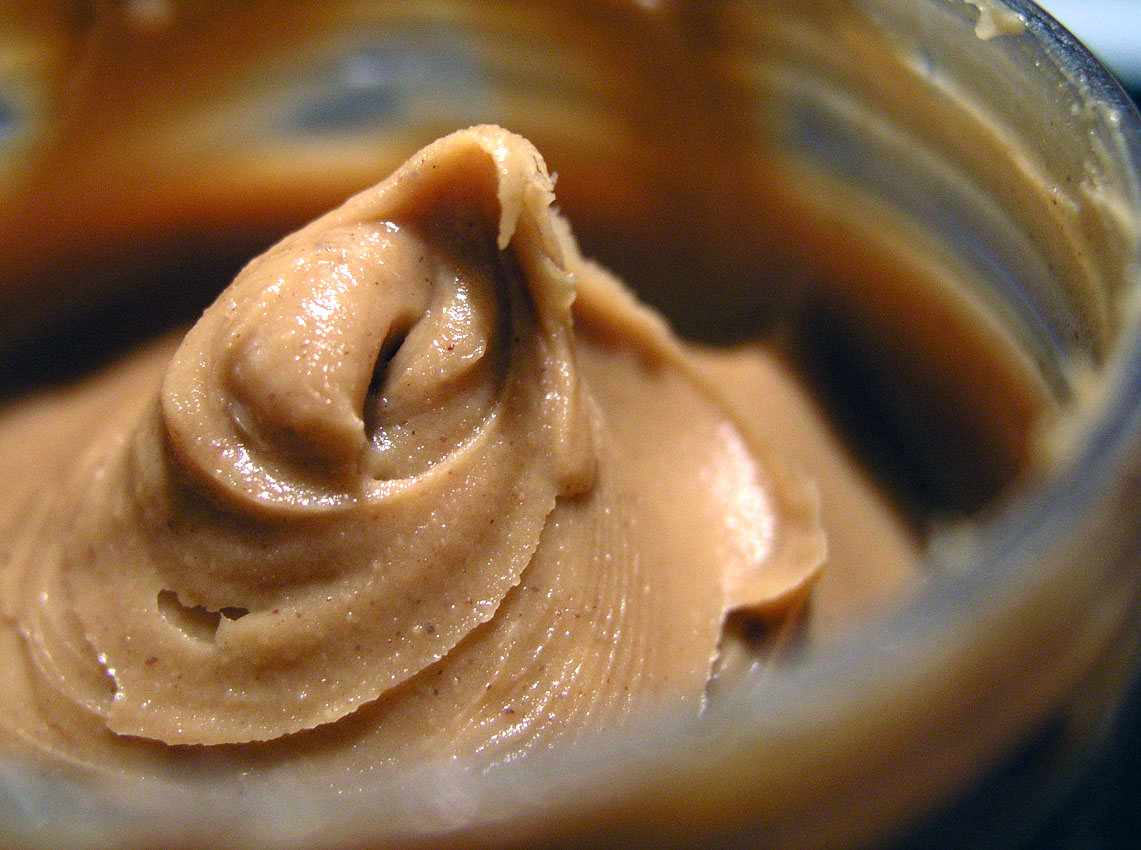
Peanut butter

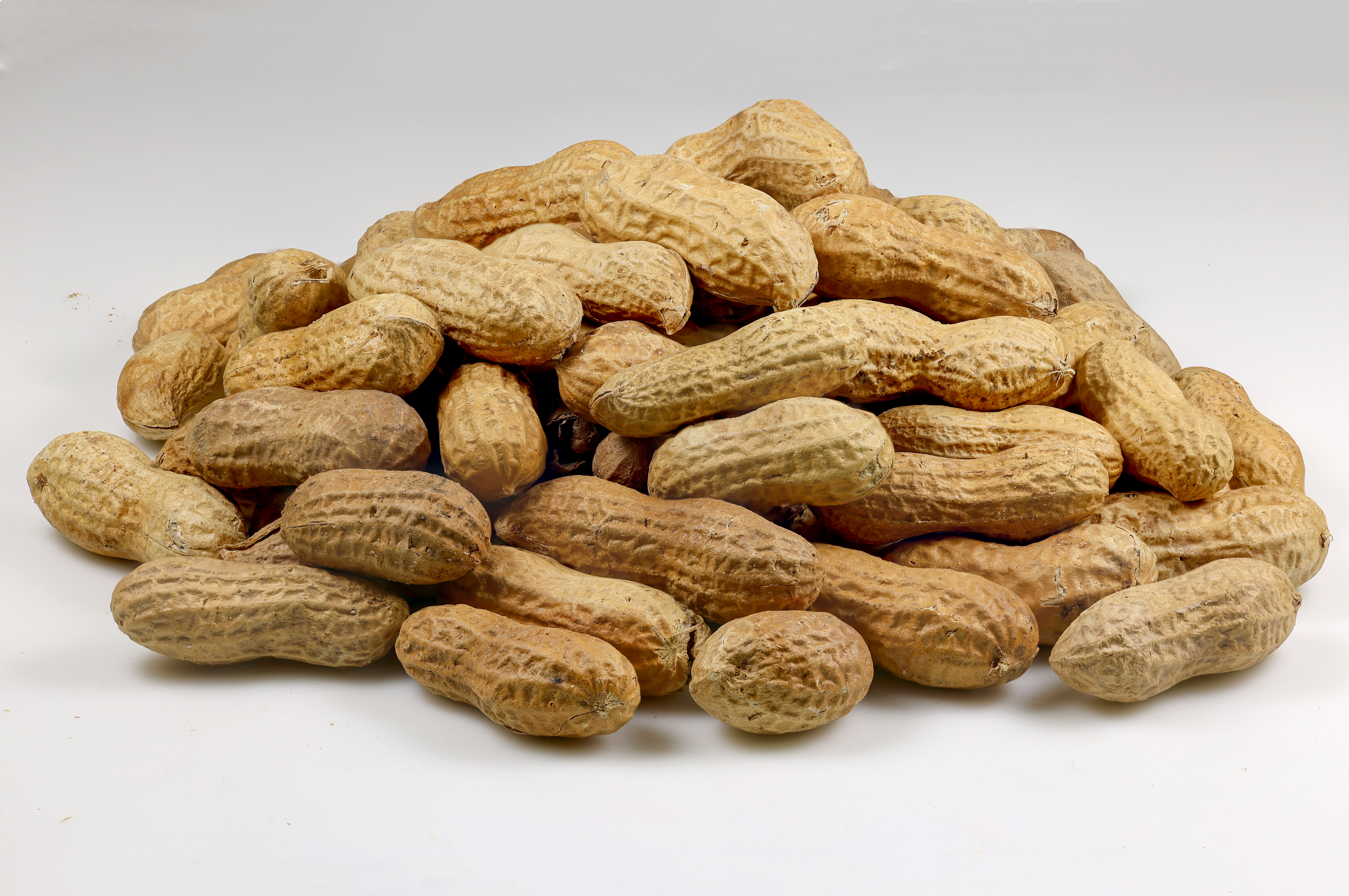
Roasted peanuts with shell

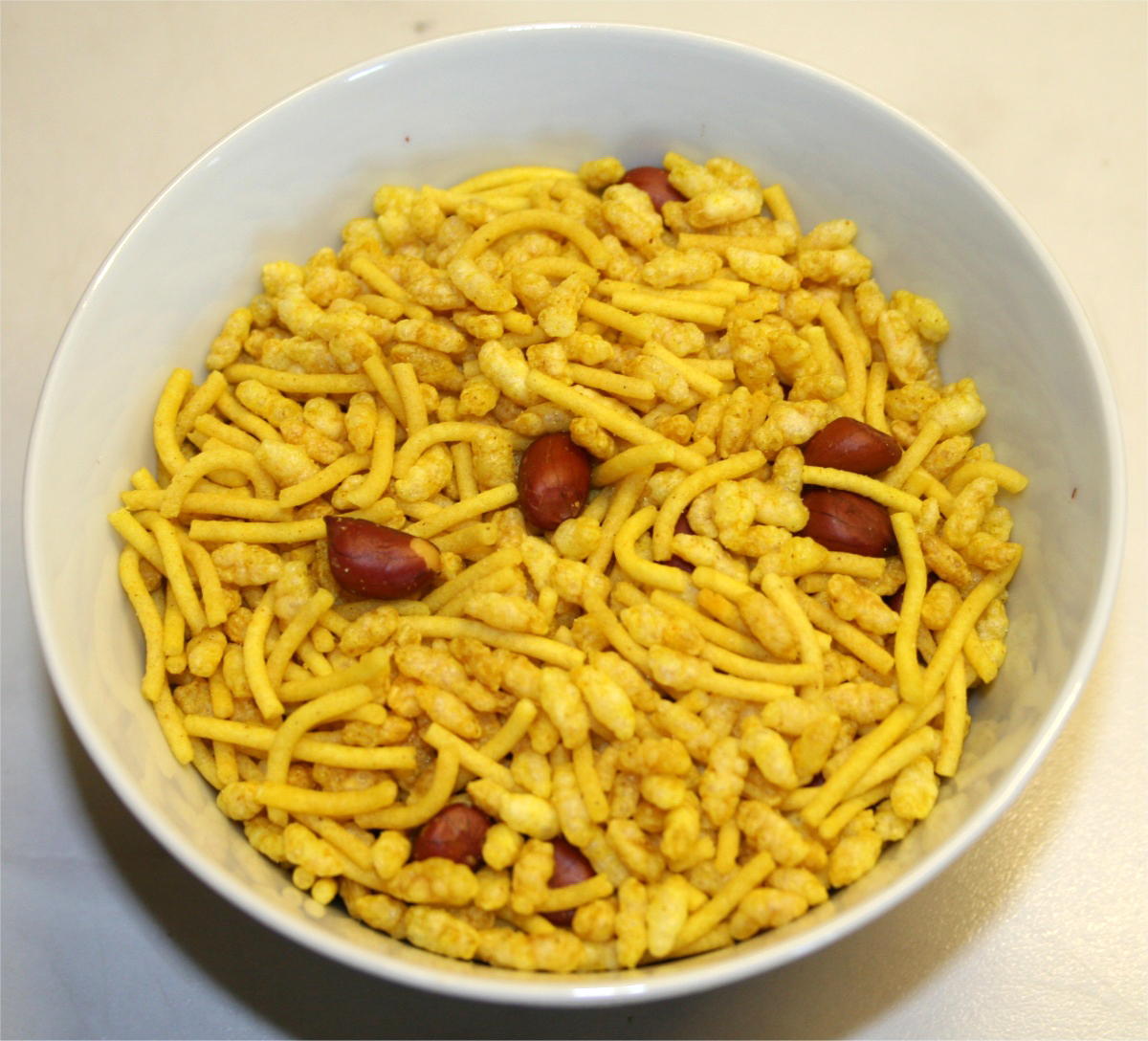
Sev mamra, puffed rice, peanuts and fried seasoned noodles

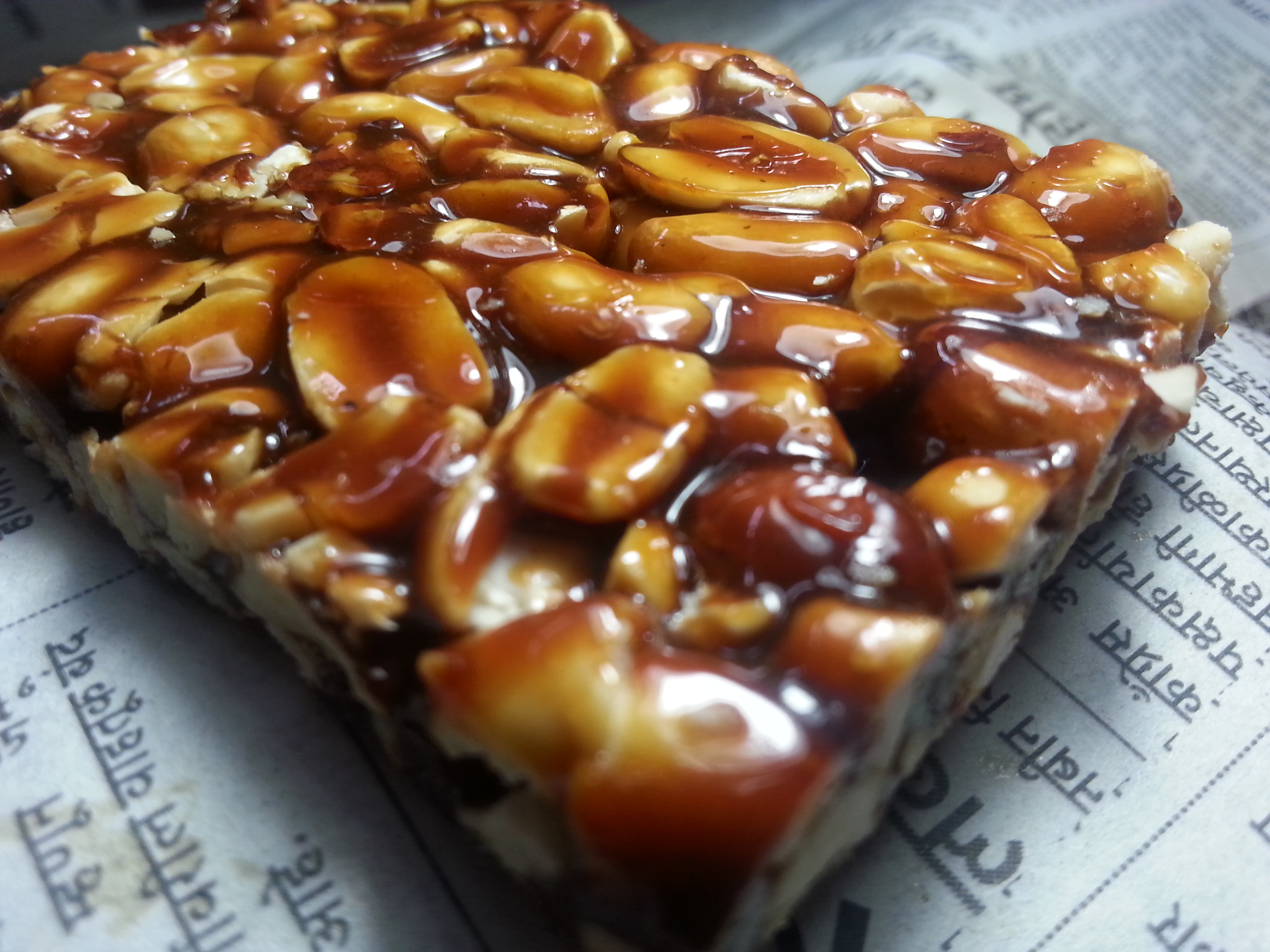
Chikki peanut sweet

== Cuisine ==
=== Latin America ===
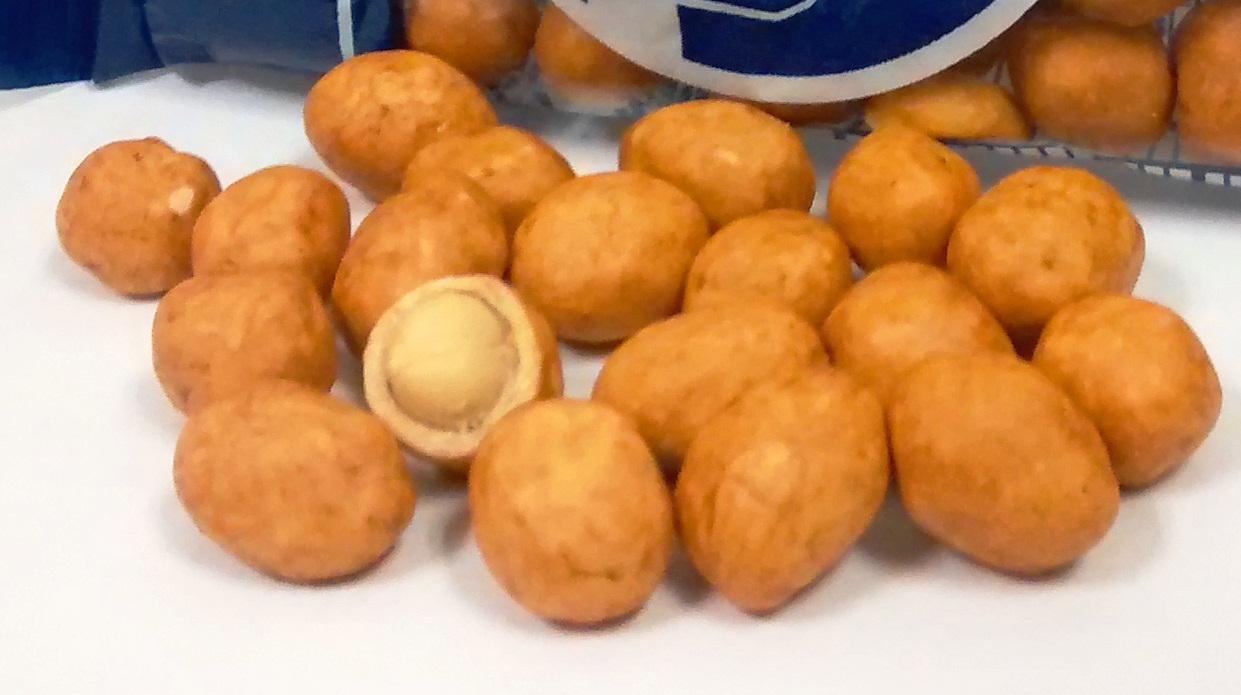
Japanese-style peanuts, invented in Mexico

Peanuts are particularly common in Peruvian and Mexican cuisine, both of which marry indigenous and European ingredients. For instance, in Peru, a popular traditional dish is picante de cuy, a roasted guinea pig served in a sauce of ground peanuts (ingredients native to South America) with roasted onions and garlic (ingredients from European cuisine). Also, in the Peruvian city of Arequipa, a dish called ocopa consists of a smooth sauce of roasted peanuts and hot peppers (both native to the region) with roasted onions, garlic, and oil, poured over meat or potatoes. Another example is a fricassee combining a similar mixture with sautéed seafood or boiled and shredded chicken. These dishes are generally known as ajíes, meaning "hot peppers", such as ají de pollo and ají de mariscos (seafood ajíes may omit peanuts). In Mexico, it is also used to prepare different traditional dishes, such as chicken in peanut sauce (encacahuatado), and is used as the main ingredient for the preparation of other famous dishes such as red pipián, mole poblano and oaxacan mole negro.

Throughout the region, many candies and snacks are made using peanuts. In Mexico, it is common to find them in different presentations as a snack or candy: salty, "Japanese" peanuts, praline, enchilados or in the form of a traditional sweet made with peanuts and honey called palanqueta, and even as peanut marzipan. There is a similar form of peanut candy in Brazil, called pé-de-moleque, made with peanuts and molasses, which resembles the Indian chikki in form.

=== Southeast Asia ===
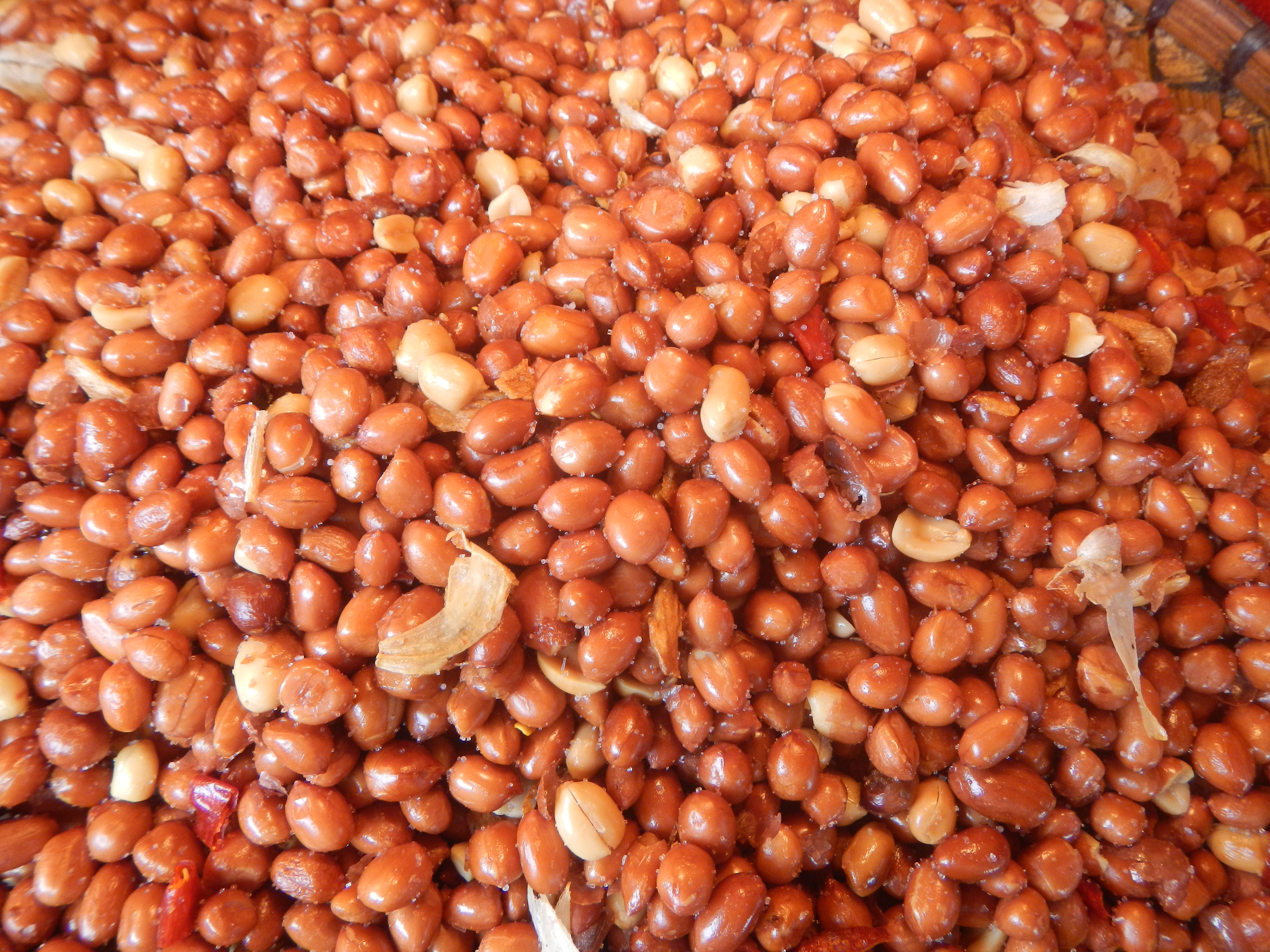
Fried peanuts in the Philippines

A Philippine dish using peanuts is kare-kare, with meat in a spicy peanut sauce.

Common Indonesian peanut-based dishes include gado-gado, pecel, karedok, and ketoprak, vegetable salads mixed with peanut sauce, and the peanut-based sauce, satay.

=== Indian subcontinent ===
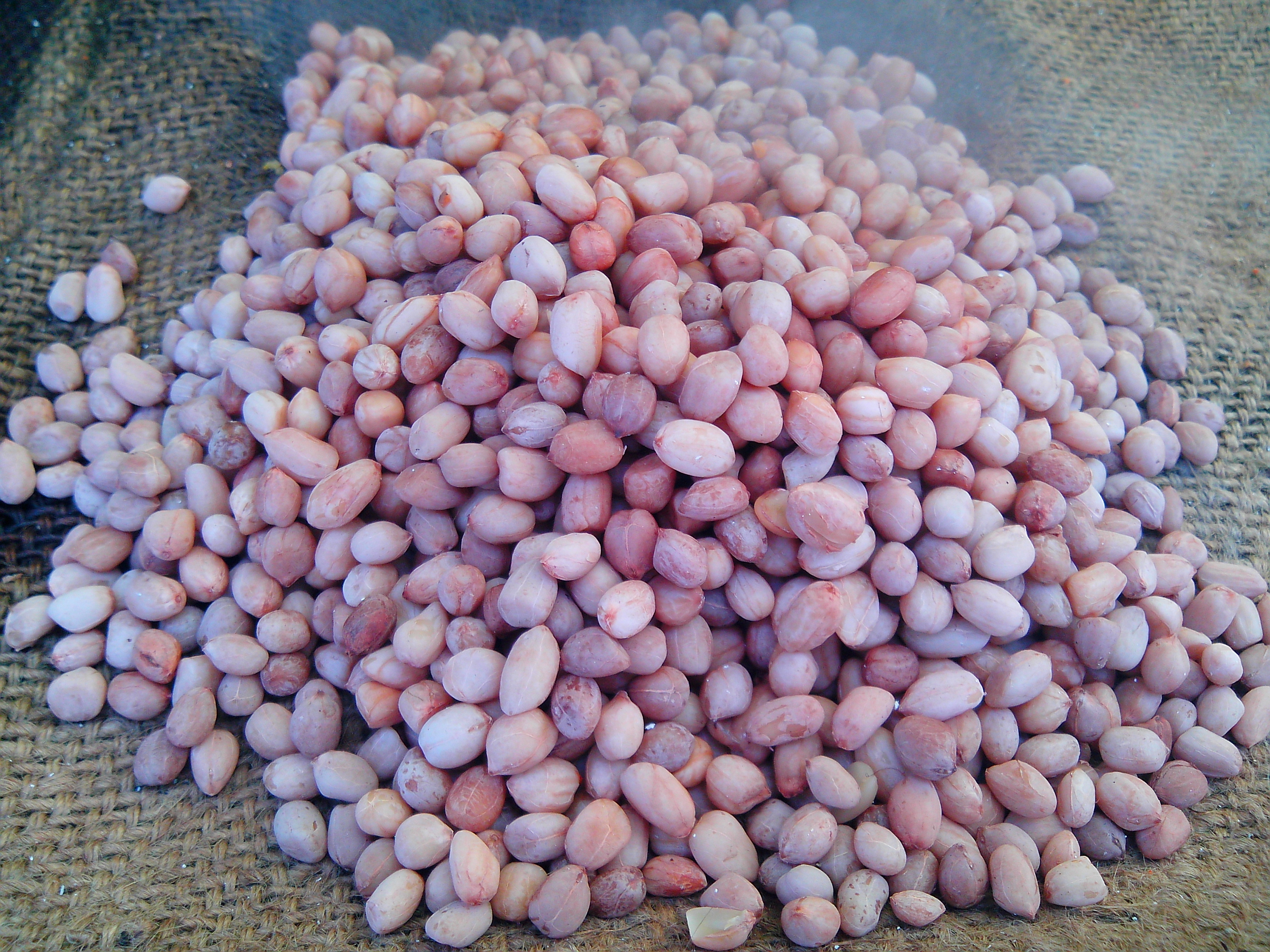
Boiled peanuts, India

In the Indian subcontinent, peanuts are made into chikki, sweet peanut brittle, by processing with refined sugar and jaggery. Indian cuisine uses roasted, crushed peanuts to give a crunchy body to salads; they are added whole to leafy vegetable stews and rice for the same reason. In South India, peanut chutney is eaten with dosa and idli. Peanuts are used as a flavor in pulihora tamarind rice.

=== West Africa ===
Peanuts are used in the Malian meat stew maafe. In Ghana, peanut butter is used for peanut butter soup nkate nkwan. Crushed peanuts may also be used for nkatie cake and kuli-kuli, as well as other local foods such as oto.

=== East Africa ===
Peanuts are a common ingredient of several relishes (dishes which accompany nshima) eaten in Malawi, and in the eastern part of Zambia, and these dishes are common throughout both countries. Thick peanut sauces are made in Uganda to serve with rice and other starchy foods. Groundnut stew, called ebinyebwa in Uganda, is made by boiling ground peanut flour with other ingredients, such as cabbage, mushrooms, dried fish, meat or vegetables.

=== North America ===
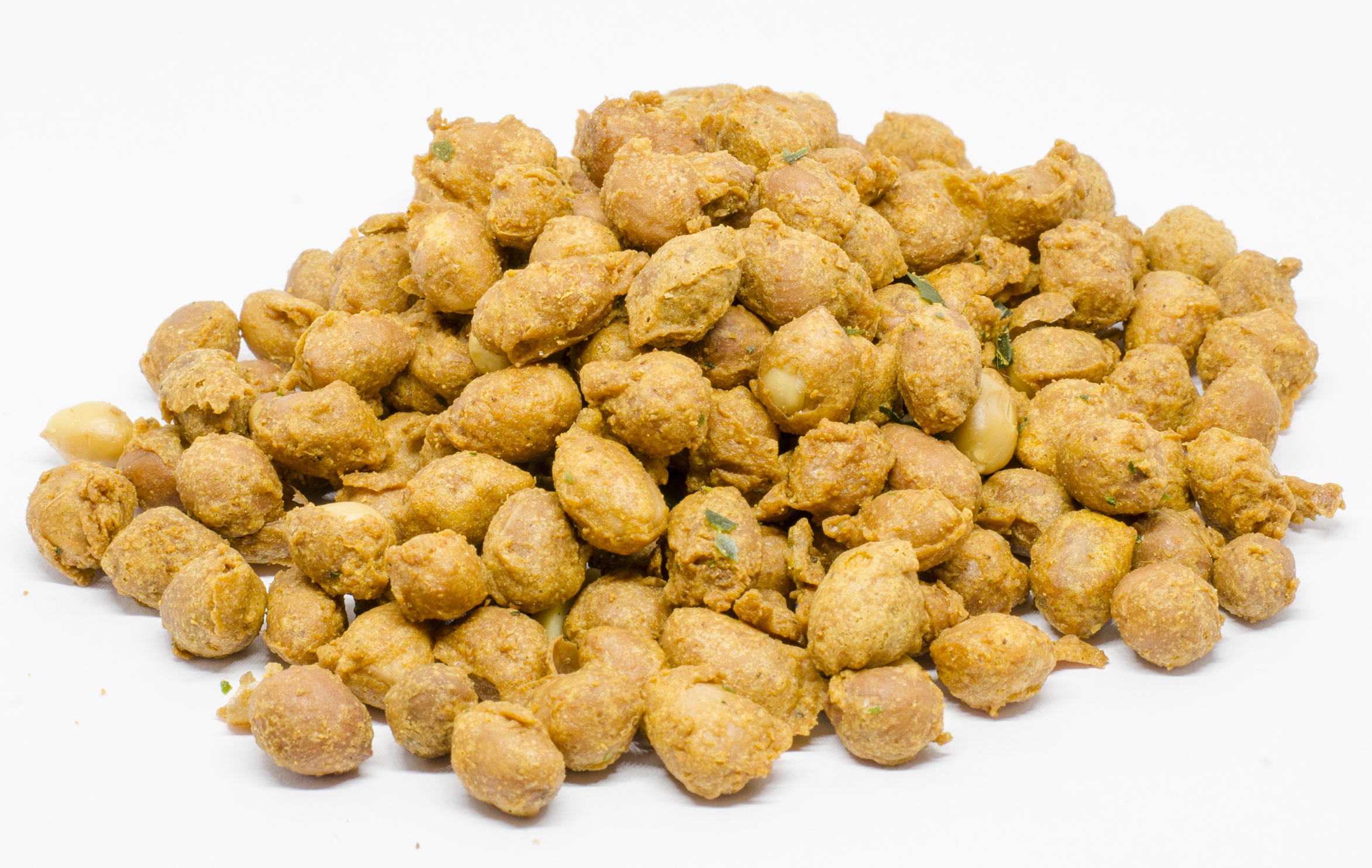
Fried curry peanuts

The state of Georgia leads the U.S. in peanut production, with 49 percent of the nation's peanut acreage and output. In 2014, farmers cultivated 591,000 acres of peanuts, yielding of 2.4 billion pounds. The most famous peanut farmer was Jimmy Carter of Sumter County, Georgia, who became the U.S. president in 1977.

In the U.S. and Canada, peanuts are used in candies, cakes, and cookies. They are eaten dry-roasted with or without salt. Ninety-five percent of Canadians eat them, with the average consumption of 3 kilograms (6 1/2 lb) per person annually, while 79% of Canadians consume peanut butter weekly. In the United States, peanut products are central in the diet, and are considered as comfort foods. Peanut butter represents half the American consumption and $850 million in annual retail sales. Peanut soup is found on restaurant menus in the southeastern states. In the southern U.S., peanuts are boiled for several hours until soft. Peanuts can be deep-fried, sometimes within the shell. Per person, Americans eat 2.7 kg (6 lb) of peanut products annually, at a retail cost of $2 billion.

== See also ==
- Aflatoxin
- African Groundnut Council
- BBCH-scale (peanut)
- Beer Nuts
- Columbian exchange
- Cracker nuts
- Ground nut soup
- List of peanut dishes
- List of edible seeds
- Peanut pie
- Power snack
- Tanganyika groundnut scheme, a failure started in 1951
- Universal Nut Sheller
