= Jacques Diouf =

Senegalese diplomat (1938–2019)

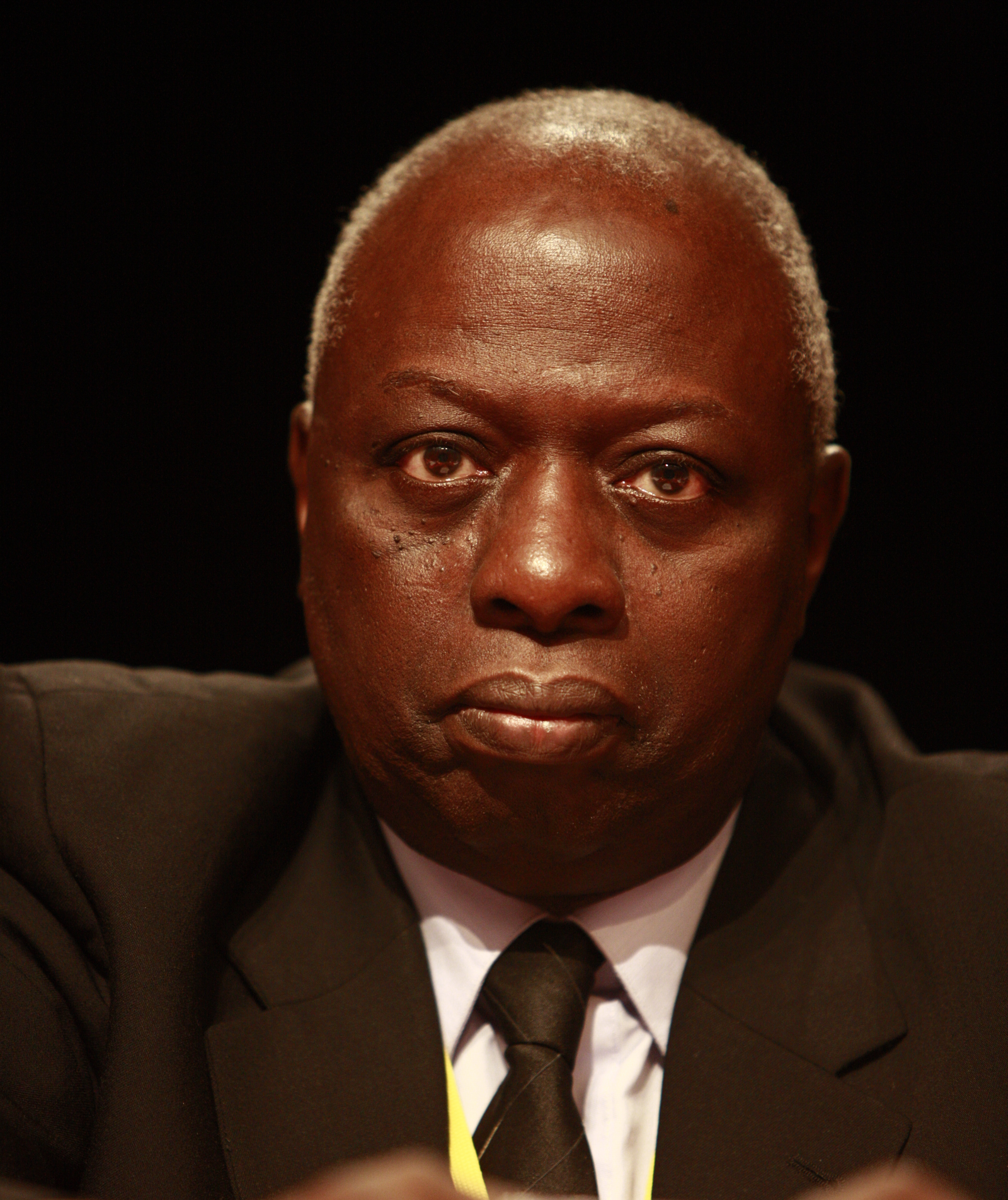

Director-General of the Food and Agriculture Organization (FAO)
- In office 1 January 1994 – 31 December 2011
- Preceded by: Edouard Saouma
- Succeeded by: José Graziano da Silva
- Deputy: Manoj Juneja (India) (Operations): 2011 – present.
- Deputy: Ann Tutwiler (US) (Knowledge): 2011 – present.
- Deputy: Changchui He (China) (Operations): 2009 – 2011.
- Deputy: James G. Butler (US) : 2008–2010.
- Deputy: David A. Harcharik (US) : 1998–2007.
- Deputy: Vikram J. Shah (ad personam) (UK) : 1992–1995.
- Deputy: Howard Hjort (US) : 1992–1997.

Personal details
- Born: 1 August 1938 Saint-Louis, Senegal
- Died: 17 August 2019 (aged 81) Paris

Jacques Diouf (1 August 1938 – 17 August 2019) was a Senegalese diplomat and the Director-General of the United Nations' Food and Agriculture Organization (FAO) from January 1994 to 31 December 2011. He died on 17 August 2019.

== Education ==
Born into a Serer family from the noble Diouf family, Diouf attended primary and secondary school in his native Saint-Louis, Senegal. He then traveled to France, where he earned a Bachelor of Science in agriculture from the Ecole nationale d'agriculture, Grignon-Paris Institut National Agronomique Paris-Grignon, a Master of Science in tropical agronomy from the Ecole nationale d'application d'agronomie tropicale, Nogent-Paris (France), Doctor of Philosophy in social sciences of the rural sector from the Faculté de droit et de sciences économiques, Panthéon – Sorbonne, Paris.

== Career ==
Beginning in 1963 at the age of 25, Diouf was the Director of the European Office and the Agricultural Program of the Marketing Board (Paris/Dakar). Leaving that position in 1964, Diouf became the Director of the African Groundnut Council based in Nigeria from 1965 to 1971. From 1971 to 1977 Diouf was the executive secretary of the newly created West Africa Rice Development Association (WARDA) (now Africa Rice Center). Leaving WARDA in 1978, Diouf became the Secretary of State for Science and Technology of the government of Senegal under both Léopold Sédar Senghor and his successor Abdou Diouf until 1983. In that year he became a member of the National Assembly of Senegal and the Senegambian Confederation. In Senegal, he was Chairman of the National Assembly's Foreign Relations Committee. From 1985 to 1990, Diouf was the Secretary-General of the Central Bank for West African States, which is based in Dakar. Subsequently, he was Senegal's Permanent Representative to the United Nations from 1991 to 1993.

On 8 November 1993, Diouf was elected Director-General of FAO and in January 1994 began his first six-year term. Diouf was re-elected twice. His last term began in January 2006 and ended in December 2011. His successor, José Graziano da Silva, was elected in June 2011 and took office on 1 January 2012.

== Other functions ==
During his career, Diouf also held other positions of responsibility, including:

- Representative of Africa to the Consultative Group on International Agricultural Research, Washington, D.C. (USA)
- Member of the Board of International Agricultural Centres: ICRAF, Nairobi (Kenya), ISNAR, The Hague (Netherlands), IITA, Lagos (Nigeria), as well as the International Institute of Scientific Research for African Development, Adiopodoumé (Côte d'Ivoire) and the International Foundation for Science, Stockholm (Sweden)
- Member of the Council of the Islamic Foundation for Science and Technology for Development, Jeddah (Saudi Arabia)
- Member of the Advisory Committee on Medical Research and the Committee on Transfer of Technology. Member of the Expert Advisory Panel on Public Health Administration and Medical Research, World Health Organization, Geneva Switzerland)
- Member of the Council of African Advisers of the World Bank, Washington, D.C. (USA)
- Adviser to the International Conservation Financing Project of the World Resources Institute, Washington, D.C. (USA)
- Member of the Board of the United Nations University's World Institute for Development Economics Research, Helsinki (Finland)
- Member of the executive board of the African Capacity Building Foundation, Harare Zimbabwe)
- Chairman of the Board of the African Regional Centre for Technology (ARCT), Dakar Senegal), the Industrial Company for the Uses of Solar Energy, Dakar (Senegal) and the Board of the Foundation for Development of Science and Technology, Dakar (Senegal)

== Honors and criticism ==
Diouf received multiple honors from governments around the world, including the Légion d'honneur in France as well as numerous governments across Africa and Latin America.

In May 2006, a British newspaper published the resignation letter of Louise Fresco, an Assistant Director General of FAO. In her letter, the widely respected Dr Fresco criticised Diouf's management style: "I am sad that you have isolated yourself so much from most senior managers. Combined with a lack of transparency in decision making, you have stimulated a culture of silence, rumors and even fear." Furthermore, she stated that "the Organisation has been unable to adapt to a new era", that "our contribution and reputation have declined steadily" and "its leadership has not proposed bold options to overcome this crisis".

In 2010, a so-called whistleblowing book was published on Amazon under a fictional name by a former staff member of FAO. It purported to describe the management methods and the state of the organization at the time of his departure. At the request of FAO officials attacked in the book, a legal action was initiated to protect the reputation of those concerned; the action was later dismissed on procedural grounds.

These are the links to these most relevant documents:

- When FAO scores only 27 points in Transparency...
- Independent Evaluation of the Food and Agriculture Organisation
- Andrew Mitchel DFID's Head about FAO's performance

== Interfaith activities ==
In 2009, Diouf took part in a special synod for Africa organized by the Catholic Church in Rome, even though he was a Muslim. The synod discussed several pastoral issues that are not directly related to religion, and which involve cooperation between the Catholic Church and the United Nations, such as food security, the status of African health care, and attempts to solve conflicts and achieve peace on the continent.

== Decorations ==
=== Foreign honours ===
- Grand Officer of the Order of the Star of Africa (Liberia, 1977)
- Officer of the Legion of Honour (France, 1978)
- Officer of the Order of Academic Palms (France, 1979)
- Grand Officer of the Order of Valour (Cameroon, 1995)
- Commander of the Order of Merit (Central African Republic, 1995)
- Commander of the National Order of the Ivory Coast (Ivory Coast, 1995)
- Grand Cross of the Order of the Lithuanian Grand Duke Gediminas (Lithuania, 1996)
- Grand Cross of the Order of Merit for Agriculture, Fisheries and Food (Spain, 1996)
- Medal of the Oriental Republic of Uruguay (Uruguay, 1996)
- Commander of the Order of the Star of Anjouan (Comoros, 1997)
- Grand Cross of the Order of May (Argentina, 1998)
- Order of Solidarity (Cuba, 1998)
- Order of the Grand Star of Djibouti (Djibouti, 1998)
- Commander of the Legion of Honour (France, 1998)
- Grand Cordon of the Honorary Order of the Yellow Star (Suriname, 1998)
- 1st Class the Order of Henri Pittier (Venezuela, 1998)
- 1st Class the Order of the Dragon Plant (Cape Verde, 2000)
- 1st Class of the Order of the Two Niles (Sudan, 2000)
- Grand Cross of the Order of the Quetzal (Guatemala, 2001)
- National Order of Merit, Cooperation and Development (Guinea-Bissau, 2001)
- Commander of the Order of Saint-Charles (Monaco, 12 October 2002)
- Order of the Golden Fleece (Georgia, 2003)
- Commander of the National Order of Merit (Mauritania, 2003)
- Knight Grand Cross of the Order of the White Elephant (Thailand, 2003)
- Grand Cross of the Order of Vasco Núñez de Balboa (Panama, 2004)
- Grand Cross of the Order of the Golden Heart (Philippines, 2004)
- Grand Cordon of the Order of Independence (Jordan, 2005)
- Commander of the National Order of Madagascar (Madagascar, 2005)
- Commander of the National Order of Mali (Mali, 2005)
- Grand Cross of the Order of the Southern Cross (Brazil, 2006)
- Grand Cross of the Order pro merito Melitensi (Sovereign Military Order of Malta, 2006)
- Commander's Cross of the Order of Merit of the Republic of Hungary (Hungary, 2007)
- Grand Cordon of the Order of the Rising Sun (Japan, 29 April 2012)
