= College of Agriculture, University of São Paulo =

Coordinates: 22°42′30″S 47°38′30″W

Luiz de Queiroz College of Agriculture
- Escola Superior de Agricultura "Luiz de Queiroz"
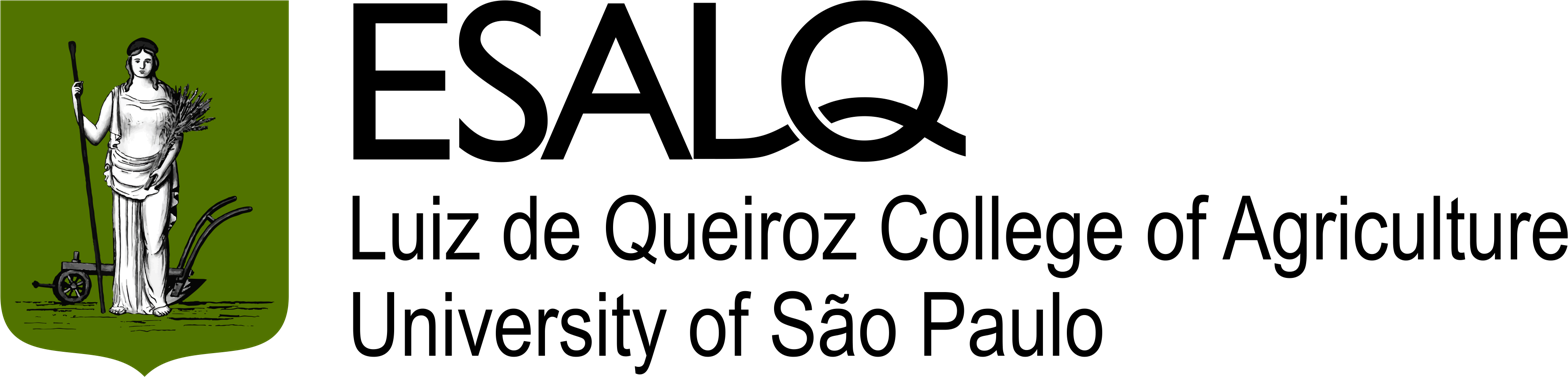
- Type: Public
- Established: 1901
- Parent institution: University of São Paulo
- Director: Thais Maria Ferreira de Souza Vieira
- Location: Avenida Pádua Dias, 235, Piracicaba, São Paulo State, Brazil
- Campus: Urban and Rural
- Colors: Red and Blue
- Mascot: Bulldog
- Website: www.en.esalq.usp.br/

The Luiz de Queiroz College of Agriculture (Portuguese: Escola Superior de Agricultura Luiz de Queiroz, ESALQ) is a unit of the University of São Paulo involved with research, teaching and extension of services in agriculture, animal husbandry, agricultural and related sciences. The school's main campus, located in Piracicaba, São Paulo, is home to seven undergraduate and eighteen graduate programs. In addition, the school maintains exchange agreements with many other institutions of the world, and welcome exchange students of several nationalities.

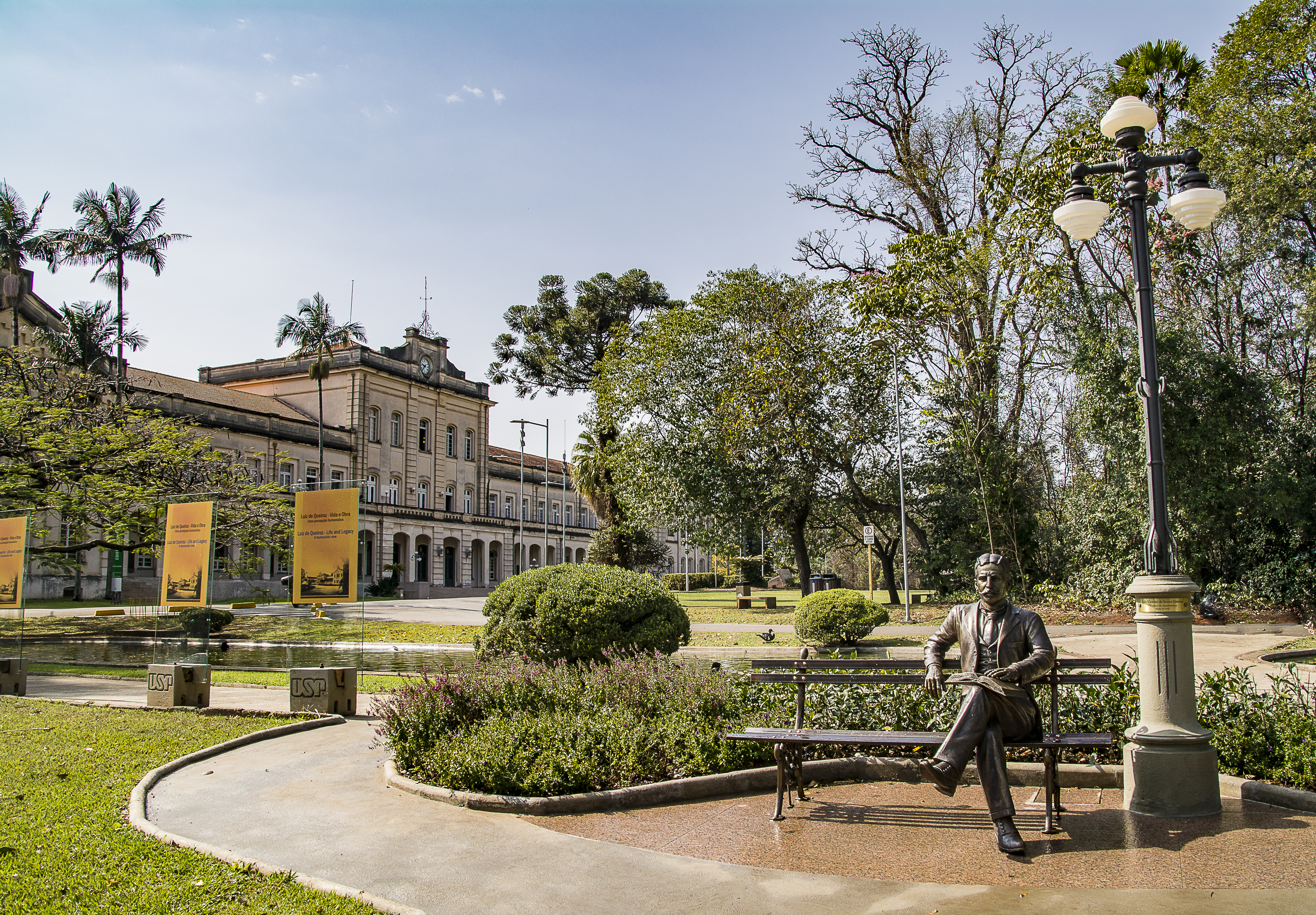
Main school building

The school was founded in 1901, by Luiz de Queiroz, an agronomist and strongly innovative farmer and industrial entrepreneur. It is one of the most traditional schools of agricultural sciences of Brazil. It is composed by the main campus (campus "Luiz de Queiroz"), and the experimental stations of Areão farm (in Portuguese:"Fazenda Areão"), Anhembi, Anhumas and Itatinga.

== Undergraduate Courses ==
- Administration
- Agronomic Engineering
- Biological Sciences
- Economic Sciences
- Environmental Management
- Food Science
- Forestry Engineering

== Graduate programs ==
- Administration
- Agricultural Microbiology
- Agricultural Systems Engineering
- Animal Science and Pastures
- Applied Ecology
- Applied Economics
- Bioenergy (inter-unit)
- Bioinformatics (inter-unit)
- Crop Science
- Entomology
- Food Science and Technology
- Forest Resources
- Genetics and Plant Breeding
- International Cellular and Molecular Plant Biology (PhD) (USP/ESALQ, Ohio State University, Rutgers University)
- Plant Pathology
- Plant Physiology and Biochemistry
- Soil and Plant Nutrition
- Statistics and Agricultural Experimentation

== Notable alumni ==
- José Graziano da Silva – Director General of the Food and Agriculture Organization (2012-2015)
- Warwick Estevam Kerr – Brazilian agricultural engineer, geneticist, entomologist known for work on sex determination of bees
