= José Graziano da Silva =

Brazilian American agronomist and writer (born 1949)

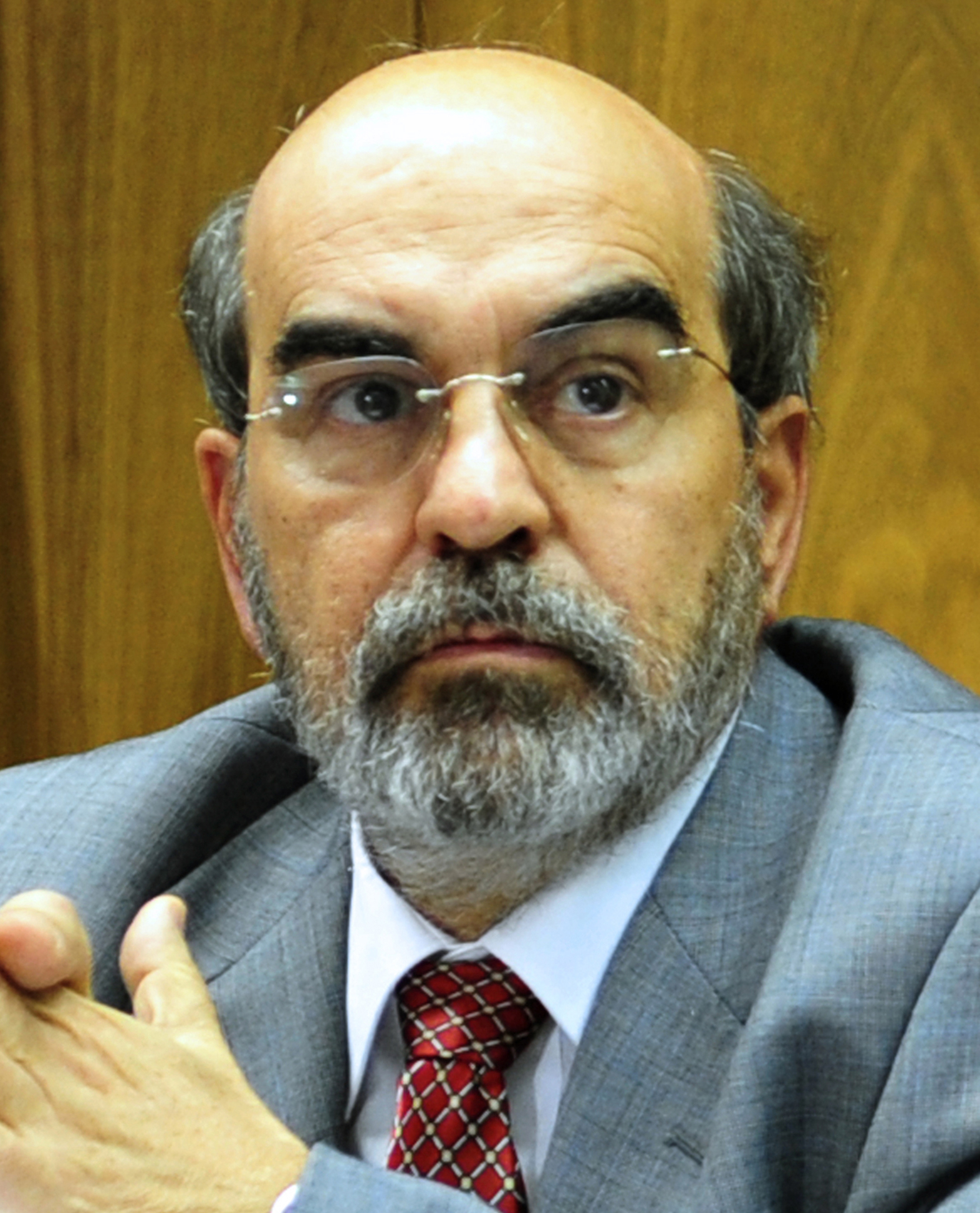

8th Director General of the Food and Agriculture Organization of the United Nations (FAO)
- In office 1 January 2012 – 31 July 2019
- Secretary-General: António Guterres; Ban Ki-moon
- Preceded by: Jacques Diouf
- Succeeded by: Qu Dongyu

Assistant Director-General at the Food and Agriculture Organization of the United Nations (FAO)
- In office 2006–2011
- Director-General: Jacques Diouf

Extraordinary Minister for Food Security
- In office 2003–2004
- President: Luiz Inácio Lula da Silva

Personal details
- Born: November 17, 1949 (age 76) Urbana, Illinois, U.S.
- Education: Escola Superior de Agricultura Luiz de Queiroz, University of São Paulo
- Profession: Agronomist

José Graziano da Silva (born November 17, 1949) is a Brazilian American agronomist and writer. As a scholar, he has authored several books about the problems of agriculture in Brazil. Between 2003 and 2004, Graziano served in the Luiz Inácio Lula da Silva cabinet as Extraordinary Minister for Food Security, being responsible for implementing the Fome Zero (Zero Hunger) program, which was a focal point of the Lula Administration's cash transfer program Bolsa Familia. On June 26, 2011, Graziano was elected director-general of the Food and Agriculture Organization (FAO), becoming the first Latin American ever to hold the position. After his first term from 1 January 2012 to 31 July 2015, Graziano da Silva was re-elected for a second 4 year-term (1 August 2015 to 31 July 2019) during FAO's 39th Conference.

== Early life and education ==
Graziano was born in Urbana, Illinois. His parents were Brazilians of Italian origin (from the Calabria region), making da Silva eligible for three citizenships: American (by jus soli), Brazilian and Italian (by jus sanguinis).

Graziano graduated as an agronomist in 1972, after attending the University of São Paulo's Escola Superior de Agricultura Luiz de Queiroz. He earned an MBA from that same institution in 1974, after presenting a dissertation about the distribution of wealth in Brazil. He received his doctor's degree from the Campinas State University in 1980, and went on to become a professor of Agricultural Economics in the same institution. He also later received post-doctorate degrees from the University of California, Berkeley and the University of London's Institute of Latin American Studies.

== Career ==
Graziano da Silva has had a professional career in the fields of food security, agriculture, and rural development. Since 1977, Graziano da Silva has devoted his efforts to issues related to rural development and fighting hunger while working in academia, at the political level and with organized labour.

The "Zero Hunger" Program was not only President Lula da Silva's overriding priority, but also represents a significant innovation in the formulation of public policies to fight extreme poverty. Particularly relevant aspects of the program are its holistic approach, its openness to civil society participation in policy planning and resource allocation as well as its monitoring, and the focus on gender as reflected in cash transfers to women in households, as a means of empowerment and ensuring more effective use of the resources.

In addition, Graziano da Silva has actively engaged in promoting joint initiatives with other agencies of the United Nations, including ECLAC, WFP, UNDP, and ILO, and international agencies such as IICA and OIE, besides supporting South-South cooperation initiatives. As FAO Regional Representative, he actively worked to implement internal reforms in FAO, with special emphasis to the agency's decentralization process, leveraging the role of national bodies, and recognizing the important role governments in the definition of priorities. Equally important has been the openness towards civil society through the engagement of a multiplicity of political, social, and professional and labour entities, in FAO activities.

=== Academic career ===
Graziano da Silva has had a long academic career from 1978 through the present day, serving as a full professor at the State University of Campinas (UNICAMP) and Chair of the Master's and Doctoral Program in Economic Development, Space, and Environment at UNICAMP's Institute for Economics. As a professor, Dr. Graziano da Silva has been credited with making a valuable contribution to the training and preparation of young Latin American professionals in the fields of rural development and food security.

=== Minister for Food Security ===
In 2001, Graziano coordinated the formulation of the Fome Zero program, one of the main points of the Luiz Inácio Lula da Silva campaign for Brazil's presidency. In late 2002, after Lula da Silva became President-elect, Graziano was appointed by him as the Extraordinary Minister for Food Security. From January 1, 2003, to January 23, 2004, he served as head of that body, being responsible for implementing - albeit not devising - the Fome Zero program, which took 28 million people out of the national poverty line during the 8 years of the Lula administration. In January 2004, Lula created the Ministry of Social Development and Fight Against Hunger to absorb the functions of the Extraordinary Ministry, naming Patrus Ananias as head of the newly created Ministry. Afterwards, Graziano became a special advisor to the Presidency of the Republic.

=== Career at FAO ===
In March 2006, Graziano became an Assistant Director General of the Food and Agriculture Organization (FAO), and served as FAO's regional representative for Latin America and the Caribbean. During his tenure, Graziano obtained from the countries of Latin America a commitment to eradicate hunger by 2025. He also promoted a program on rural issues, which defends the strengthening of institutions and public policies aimed at achieving comprehensive and inclusive development in rural areas.

In 2011, Graziano launched his candidacy for the post of Director General of FAO. He was elected on June 26, 2011, by the agency's 37th conference in Rome, replacing Jacques Diouf, whose 18-year tenure prompted a change in the agency's rules to set term limits. Graziano received 92 of the 180 votes on a second ballot, defeating former Spanish Minister of Foreign Affairs Miguel Ángel Moratinos. Other candidates on the first ballot were Franz Fischler (Austria), Indroyono Soesilo (Indonesia), Mohammad Saeid Noori Naeini (Iran), and Latif Rashid (Iraq). Graziano's term as Director General of FAO began on January 1, 2012, and end in July 2015.

Oxfam welcomed Graziano's victory, saying he had the expertise and commitment to "transform our broken food system and make the shift toward a new agricultural future". The United States also welcomed Graziano's election, stressing the need for continued reform and a push for sustainable agricultural development, greater access to nutritional crops and more opportunities for women and small-scale farmers.

Graziano da Silva was the sole candidate in the elections for FAO's top leadership post in 2015. He was therefore re-elected for a second term (from 1 August 2015 to 31 July 2019) with 177 votes out of the 182 total ballots cast. His tenure in the second term was marked by some controversy, including as a result of FAO recruitment of Nadine Heredia Alarcón de Humala, wife of the former president of Peru, Ollanta Humala, to a senior position, at a time when she was being investigated by Peru following corruption allegations.

In his work for FAO, Graziano da Silva has sought to strengthen family farming and rural development as a path to enhanced food security. Also important has been his key role in fostering the "Hunger-Free Latin America and the Caribbean Initiative", which has made the region the first one in the world to commit itself to eradicating hunger by 2025.

Graziano da Silva has also promoted a substantive agenda connected to rural issues, advocating for the strengthening of the sector's institutions and for public policies to ensure full and inclusive development in the countryside, with particular emphasis on the problem of rural employment. On this front, three studies prepared by FAO's Regional Office deserve to be mentioned: Boom Agrícola y Persistencia de la Pobreza Rural (Agricultural Boom and the Persistence of Rural Poverty), La Institucionalidad Agropecuaria en América Latina, Estado Actual y Desafíos (Agricultural Institutional Framework in Latin America, Current Status and Challenges), and Políticas de Mercado de Trabajo y Pobreza Rural en América Latina (Employment Market Policies and Rural Poverty in Latin America).

== Controversy ==
Graziano da Silva's controversies include recognizing Venezuelan President Nicolás Maduro for "reducing hunger" in 2013 and 2015 while Venezuela was actually suffering acute food shortages and attempting to hire former First Lady of Peru, Nadine Heredia, while under national indictment for corruption charges. The UN appointment would have conferred the former First Lady with diplomatic immunity against corruption crimes.

== Works ==
Graziano is the author of important publications on rural development, food security, and agrarian economics. He has published 25 books, including De boias frias an empregados rurais ("From Bóias Frias to Rural Workers") and his most work, O que é a questão agrária? (English: What is the Agrarian Question?), originally published by the Brasiliense publishing house in 1980.

== Personal life ==
Graziano is married to journalist and lawyer Paola Ligasacchi. He has two children and five grandchildren.

== Awards and recognition ==
Graziano is the recipient of numerous awards and honors, such as the Order of Rio Branco, bestowed by the Brazilian president; the Paulista Medal for Scientific and Technological Merit, conferred by the São Paulo State government; and the Brazilian Society of Rural Economics, Administration and Sociology Award (Prêmio SOBER).

In April, 2013 Graziano was given the title of a Samoan chief while taking part in a regional FAO meeting for the South Pacific. He was bestowed the title of Tagaloaletoaolemalaeoletoto (Tagaloa the warrior of the battleground of blood). On 4 November 2013, he was bestowed with the title 'Grand Officier de l'Ordre National du Benin' by the Grand Chancellor of the National Order of Benin, Ms. Koubourath Anjorin Osseni in recognition of FAO's important contribution in eliminating hunger and malnutrition in Benin. However, the "Zero Hunger" has now widely been viewed as with a 3.99% malnutrition death rate.

His other awards include the Medal of the Oriental Republic of Uruguay (2019), Medal Dr. Alvarado Barcellos Fagundes (2019), Order of Merit in the Diplomatic and International Field from Slovenia (2019), Ordre national du Lion Commandeur (2019), First Class Medal of Merit Citizenship from Cape Verde (2018), Order of the Two Niles from Sudan Government (2018), Officier de l’Ordre National du Burkina Faso (2018), Commandeur de l’Ordre National de la Republique de Madagascar (2016), Cavaliere di Gran Croce della Repubblica Italiana (2015), Member of the Board of Trustees of the Khalifa International Date Palm Award (2014).
