= African Groundnut Council =

Intergovernmental organization

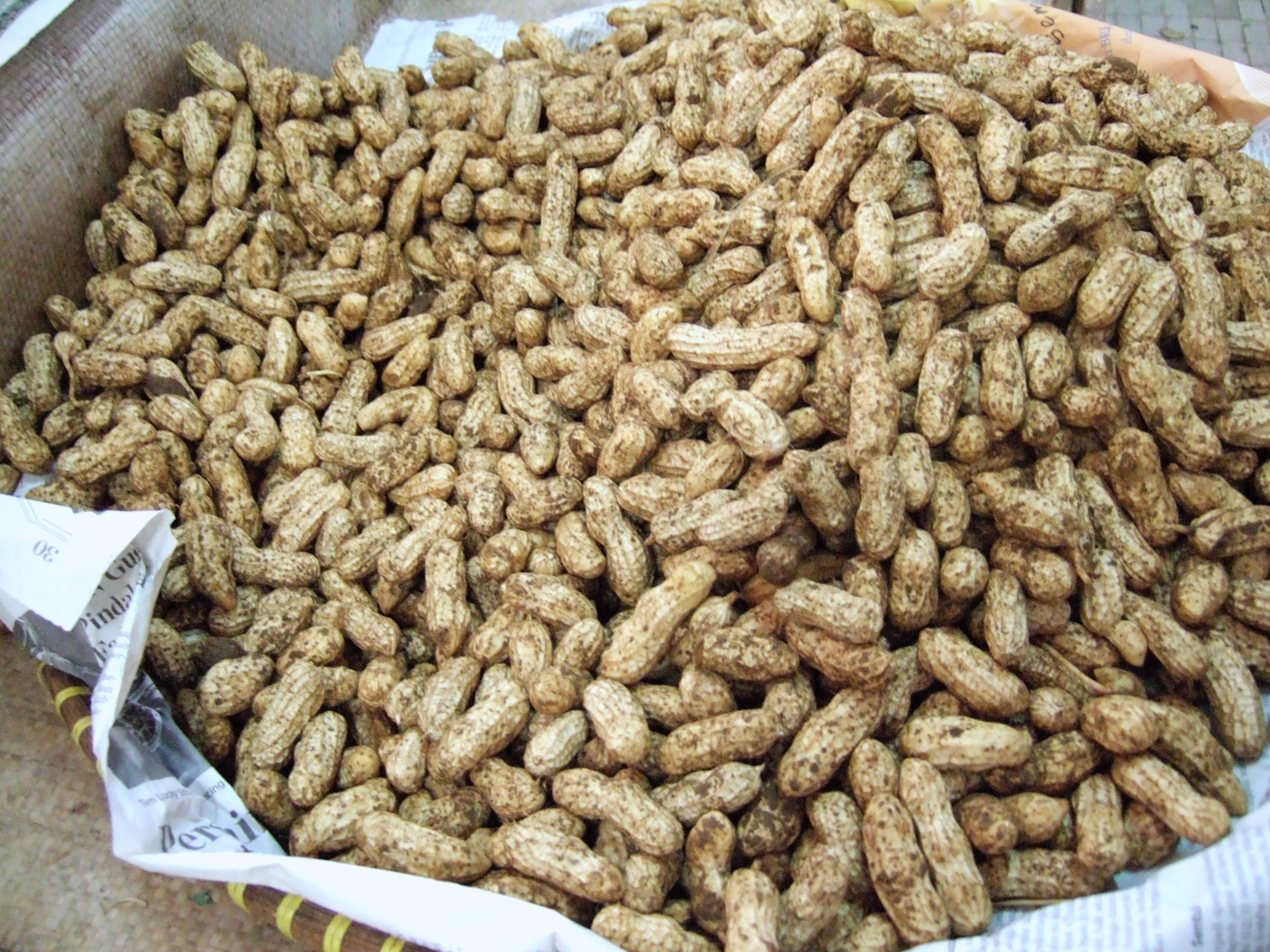
- Formation: 1964
- Headquarters: Lagos
- Location(s): Africa (Mali, Niger, Senegal, Gambia, Sudan, Nigeria)

The African Groundnut Council is an Intergovernmental organization designed to promote groundnuts produced in the countries of the Gambia, Mali, Niger, Senegal, the Sudan and Nigeria.

== History ==
Founded in June 1964, the AGC was based in Lagos, Nigeria, from its founding until 2005, when it moved to Kano. It moved in 2005 due to lobbying by the Groundnut Farmers Association of Nigeria. The first executive secretary of the organization was Jacques Diouf.

The setting up of AGC was intended to promote economic cooperation and discuss common problems such as commodity pricing among African producers, it also acts as a common marketing, research and publicity body for its members. Governments of producing countries at the turn of independence received a significant percentage of national income and foreign exchange receipts from groundnut. The AGC was initiated to help establish cooperative action to stabilise prices and advance producer interest in the international commodity markets.

== Objectives and functions ==
=== Quality control ===
The council played a great role in setting up standards for groundnut quality and ensuring the export met with the expected requirements of international traders.This is very important for maintaining the competitiveness of African groundnut.

==== Advocacy and negotiation ====
The council (AGC) acted as a collective voice for African groundnut manufacturers in international market and also in seeking global influence for trade policies and securing a favorable terms for export.

===== Coordination of product =====
The council helps to harmonize production strategies of members across the countries to prevent oversupply and stabilize prices of groundnut in the world market.
