= Legume Information System =

Tool for legume researchers and breeders

The Legume Information System (LIS) is legume sciences portal specifically for legume breeders and researchers, established and supported by the Agricultural Research Service of the United States Department of Agriculture. The mission of the Legume Information System is "to facilitate discoveries and crop improvement in the legumes," in particular to improve crop yields, their nutritional value, and our understanding of basic legume science.

Development of the Legume Information System is a joint venture between the National Center for Genome Resources (NCGR) and the USDA-ARS at Iowa State University. In 2014, development effort on LIS shifted from the comparative-legumes.org domain to legumeinfo.org. The comparative-legumes site was developed using the Ruby on Rails framework, and the LegumeInfo site is developed using the Tripal content management system.

== The reference species as a backbone for orphan species research ==
A fundamental approach taken in LIS is facilitate research in the orphan species by taking advantage of more extensive knowledge developed for the reference species. Use of synteny and local similarity, for instance, provides a basis for trait inference.

=== Reference species ===
Note that LIS makes use of the UniProt organism mnemonics for identifying species whenever possible.

The current legume reference species (also referred to as model organisms) are the following:

- Glycine max (soybean), GLYMA
- Lotus japonicus (lotus), LOTJA
- Medicago truncatula (barrel medic), MEDTR
- Phaseolus vulgaris (common bean), PHAVU

=== Orphan species ===
Orphan species represented at LIS are:

- Arachis duranensis (wild peanut), ARADU
- Arachis ipaensis (wild peanut), ARAIP
- Arachis hypogaea (peanut), ARAHY
- Cajanus cajan (pigeon pea), CAJCA
- Chamaecrista fasciculata (partidge pea), CHAFS
- Cicer arietinum (chickpea), CICAR
- Lens culinaris (lentil), LENCU
- Lupinus albus (white lupin), LUPAL
- Lupinus angustifolius (narrow-leafed lupin), LUPAN
- Medicago sativa (alfalfa), MEDSA
- Pisum sativum (garden pea), PISSA
- Trifolium pratense (red clover), TRIPR
- Trifolium repens (white clover), TRIRE
- Vicia faba (faba bean), VICFA
- Vigna angularis (adzuki bean), VIGAN
- Vigna unguiculata (cowpea), VIGUN

== See also ==
- Legumes
- Pulses
