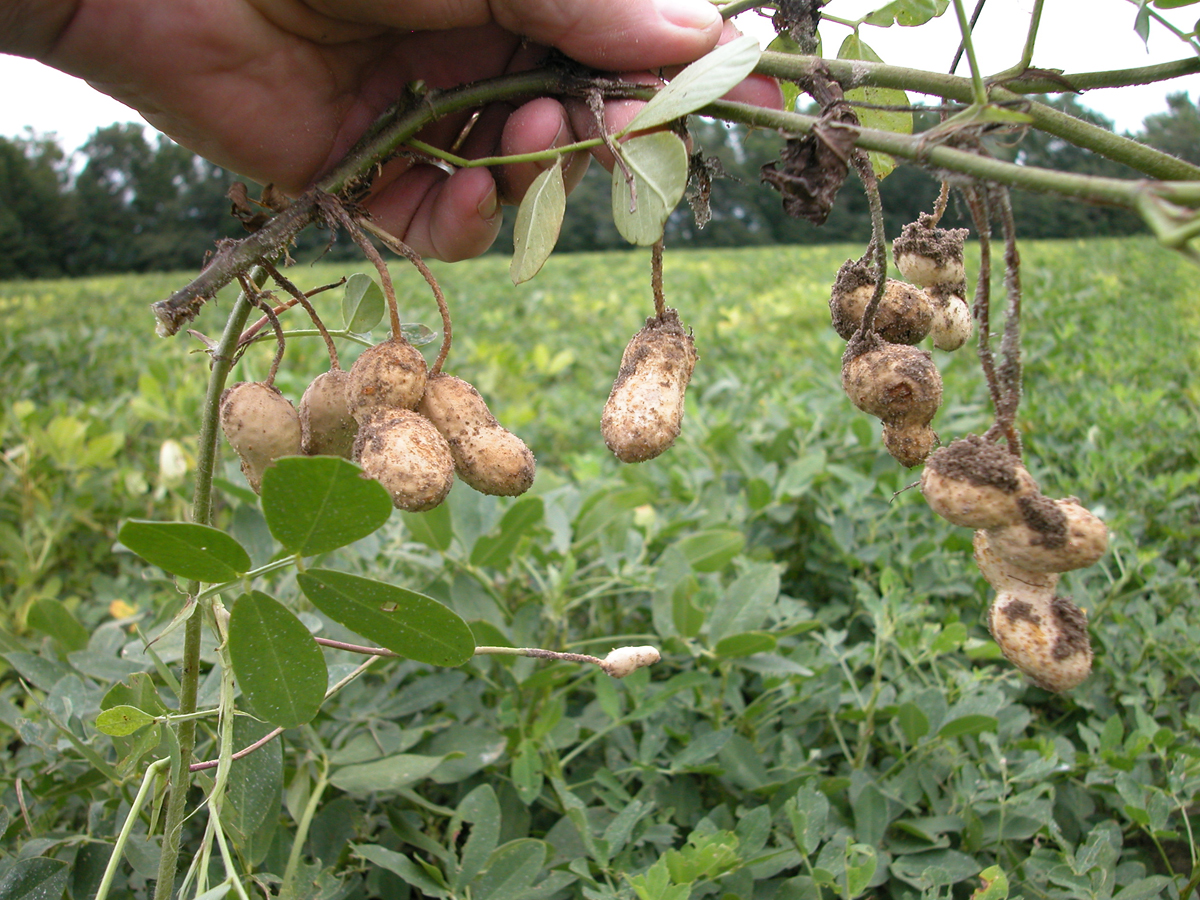
- Arachis hypogaea leaves and freshly dug pods

Scientific classification
- Kingdom: Plantae
- Clade: Embryophytes
- Clade: Tracheophytes
- Clade: Spermatophytes
- Clade: Angiosperms
- Clade: Eudicots
- Clade: Rosids
- Order: Fabales
- Family: Fabaceae
- Subfamily: Faboideae
- Tribe: Dalbergieae
- Genus: Arachis; L.

Species
- See text

Synonyms
- Arachidna Plum. ex Boehm. (1760), nom. superfl.; Mundubi Adans. (1763)

= Arachis =

Genus of legumes

Arachis is a genus of about 70 species of annual and perennial flowering plants in the family (Fabaceae), native to South America, and was recently assigned to the informal monophyletic Pterocarpus clade of the Dalbergieae. At least one species, the peanut (Arachis hypogaea), is a major food crop species of global importance; some of the other species are cultivated for food to a small extent in South America. Other species such as A. pintoi are cultivated worldwide as forage and soil conditioner plants, with the leaves providing high-protein feed for grazing livestock and a nitrogen source in agroforestry and permaculture systems.

Arachis species, including the peanut, are used as food plants by some Lepidoptera species, including the flame shoulder, nutmeg, and turnip moth.

== Species ==
Arachis comprises the following sections and species:

=== Section Arachis ===
- Arachis batizocoi Krapov. & W.C. Greg.
- Arachis benensis Krapov. et al.
- Arachis cardenasii Krapov. & W.C. Greg.
- Arachis correntina (Burkart) Krapov. & W.C. Greg.
- Arachis cruziana Krapov. et al.
- Arachis decora Krapov. et al.
- Arachis diogoi Hoehne
- Arachis duranensis Krapov. & W.C. Greg.
- Arachis glandulifera Stalker
- Arachis gregoryi C. E. Simpson et al.
- Arachis helodes Mart. ex Krapov. & Rigoni
- Arachis herzogii Krapov. et al.
- Arachis hoehnei Krapov. & W.C. Greg.
- Arachis hypogaea L.—peanut
  - subsp. fastigiata Waldron
    - var. aequatoriana Krapov. & W. C. Greg
    - var. fastigiata (Waldron) Krapov. & W. C. Greg
    - var. peruviana Krapov. & W. C. Greg
    - var. vulgaris Harz
  - subsp. hypogaea L.
    - var. hirsuta J. Kohler
    - var. hypogaea L.
- Arachis ipaensis Krapov. & W.C. Greg.
- Arachis kempff-mercadoi Krapov. et al.
- Arachis krapovickasii C. E. Simpson et al.
- Arachis kuhlmannii Krapov. & W.C. Greg.
- Arachis linearifolia Valls et al.
- Arachis magna Krapov. et al.
- Arachis microsperma Krapov. et al.
- Arachis monticola Krapov. & Rigoni
- Arachis palustris Krapov. et al.
- Arachis praecox Krapov. et al.
- Arachis schininii Krapov. et al.
- Arachis simpsonii Krapov. & W.C. Greg.
- Arachis stenosperma Krapov. & W.C. Greg.
- Arachis trinitensis Krapov. & W.C. Greg.
- Arachis valida Krapov. & W.C. Greg.
- Arachis villosa Benth.
- Arachis williamsii Krapov. & W.C. Greg.

=== Section Caulorrhizae ===
- Arachis pintoi Krapov. & W.C. Greg.
- Arachis repens Handro

=== Section Erectoides ===
- Arachis archeri Krapov. & W.C. Greg.
- Arachis benthamii Handro
- Arachis brevipetiolata Krapov. & W.C. Greg.
- Arachis cryptopotamica Krapov. & W.C. Greg.
- Arachis douradiana Krapov. & W.C. Greg.
- Arachis gracilis Krapov. & W.C. Greg.
- Arachis hatschbachii Krapov. & W.C. Greg.
- Arachis hermannii Krapov. & W.C. Greg.
- Arachis major Krapov. & W.C. Greg.
- Arachis martii Handro
- Arachis oteroi Krapov. & W.C. Greg.
- Arachis paraguariensis Chodat & Hassl.
  - subsp. capibarensis Krapov. & W. C. Greg
  - subsp. paraguariensis Chodat & Hassl.
- Arachis porphyrocalyx Valls & C. E. Simpson
- Arachis stenophylla Krapov. & W.C. Greg.

=== Section Extranervosae ===
- Arachis burchellii Krapov. & W.C. Greg.
- Arachis lutescens Krapov. & Rigoni
- Arachis macedoi Krapov. & W.C. Greg.
- Arachis marginata Gardner
- Arachis pietrarellii Krapov. & W.C. Greg.
- Arachis prostrata Benth.—grassnut
- Arachis retusa Krapov. et al.
- Arachis setinervosa Krapov. & W.C. Greg.
- Arachis submarginata Valls et al.
- Arachis villosulicarpa Hoehne

=== Section Heteranthae ===
- Arachis dardani Krapov. & W.C. Greg.
- Arachis giacomettii Krapov. et al.
- Arachis interrupta Valls & C. E. Simpson
- Arachis pusilla Benth.
- Arachis seridoensis Valls et al.
- Arachis sylvestris (A. Chev.) A. Chev.

=== Section Procumbentes ===
- Arachis appressipila Krapov. & W. C. Greg.
- Arachis chiquitana Krapov. et al.
- Arachis kretschmeri Krapov. & W.C. Greg.
- Arachis hassleri Krapov. et al.
- Arachis lignosa (Chodat & Hassl.) Krapov. & W.C. Greg.
- Arachis matiensis Krapov. et al.
- Arachis pflugeae C. E. Simpson et al.
- Arachis rigonii Krapov. & W.C. Greg.
- Arachis subcoriacea Krapov. & W.C. Greg.
- Arachis vallsii Krapov. & W.C. Greg.

=== Section Rhizomatosae ===
- Arachis nitida Valls et al.

==== Series Prorhizomatosae ====
- Arachis burkartii Handro

==== Series Rhizomatosae ====
- Arachis glabrata Benth.
  - var. glabrata Benth.
  - var. hagenbeckii (Harms) F. J. Herm.
- Arachis pseudovillosa (Chodat & Hassl.) Krapov. & W.C. Greg.

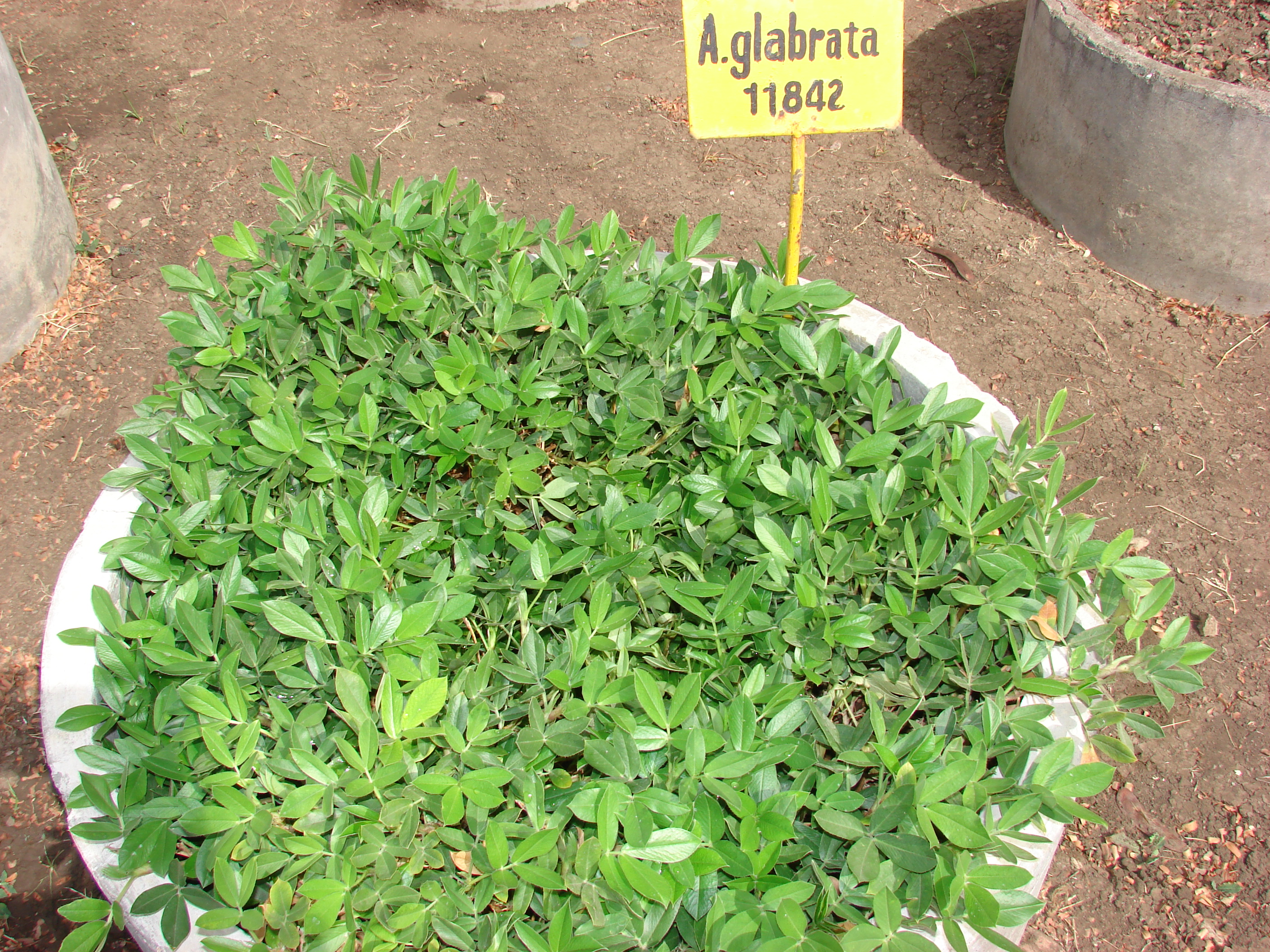
Arachis glabrata

=== Section Trierectoides ===
- Arachis guaranitica Chodat & Hassl.
- Arachis tuberosa Benth.

=== Section Triseminatae ===
- Arachis triseminata Krapov. & W.C. Greg.

== Hybrids ==
- Arachis × batizogaea Krapov. & A. Fernández
