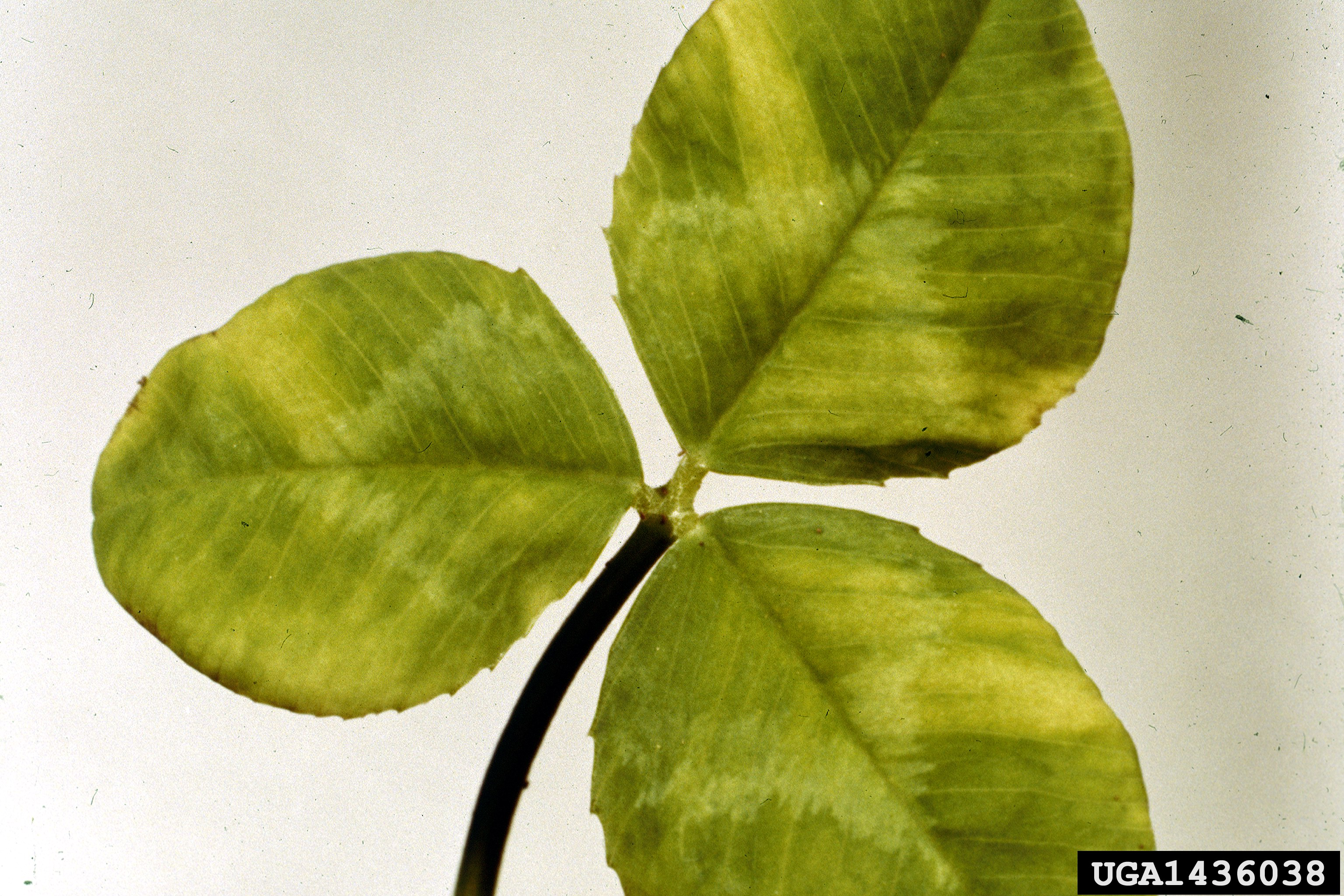
- Symptoms of peanut mottle virus in a clover leaf (Trifolium spp. L.)

Virus classification
- (unranked): Virus
- Realm: Riboviria
- Kingdom: Orthornavirae
- Phylum: Pisuviricota
- Class: Stelpaviricetes
- Order: Patatavirales
- Family: Potyviridae
- Genus: Potyvirus
- Species: Potyvirus arachidis

Synonyms
- Peanut green mosaic virus Peanut chlorotic mottle virus Peanut mild mosaic virus Groundnut mottle virus

= Peanut mottle virus =

Species of virus

Peanut mottle virus (PeMoV) is a pathogenic plant virus of the family Potyviridae. As with other members of this virus family, PeMoV is a flexuous filamentous virus with particles 740–750 nm long. It is transmitted by several species of aphids and by mechanical inoculation. It was first given its name in 1965 when it was isolated from peanuts (Arachis hypogaea) in Georgia, United States. The virus was found to be seed transmitted in its host.

== Host species ==
Besides peanuts, the virus is known to infect soybeans (Glycine max), French beans (Phaseolus vulgaris), peas (Pisum sativum), and various weed species of Cassia. Since 1964 it has been identified in East Africa and north-east Australia (in bean) and possible Venezuela, Japan, Malaysia and Bulgaria. Given the fact that PeMoV is seed transmissible in peanuts, the virus could occur anywhere peanuts are grown. In the United States, for example, a survey done in 1975 found the virus in all states where peanuts were grown.

== Symptoms ==
The symptoms of the virus in peanuts appear as irregular dark islands on young leaves. The symptoms are not as clear on older leaves and thus can be easily missed even when the virus is in epidemic proportions in the field.

In infected plant cells, the virus makes characteristic potyvirus cylindrical inclusions. that are visible in the light microscope with proper staining.

== Disease control ==
A study of the spread of the virus in Georgia showed that the virus moved from infected peanut plants to nearby soybean fields and was only present in soybeans in areas where peanuts were also grown. Thus, the recommended approach to control the virus in peanuts and other susceptible hosts such as soybeans is the planting of PeMoV-free seed.

PeMoV was reported for the first time in 2007 to infect Rhizoma peanuts (A. glabrata) in Georgia. The plant is propagated by cuttings and is a perennial crop. To avoid spread, growers of the perennial plant have to maintain virus free stock and destroy infected fields. If the virus spreads in perennial peanuts in the Southern United States, the plant has the potential to become a reservoir of the virus and increase its spread to field peanut and soybean via aphid transmission.
