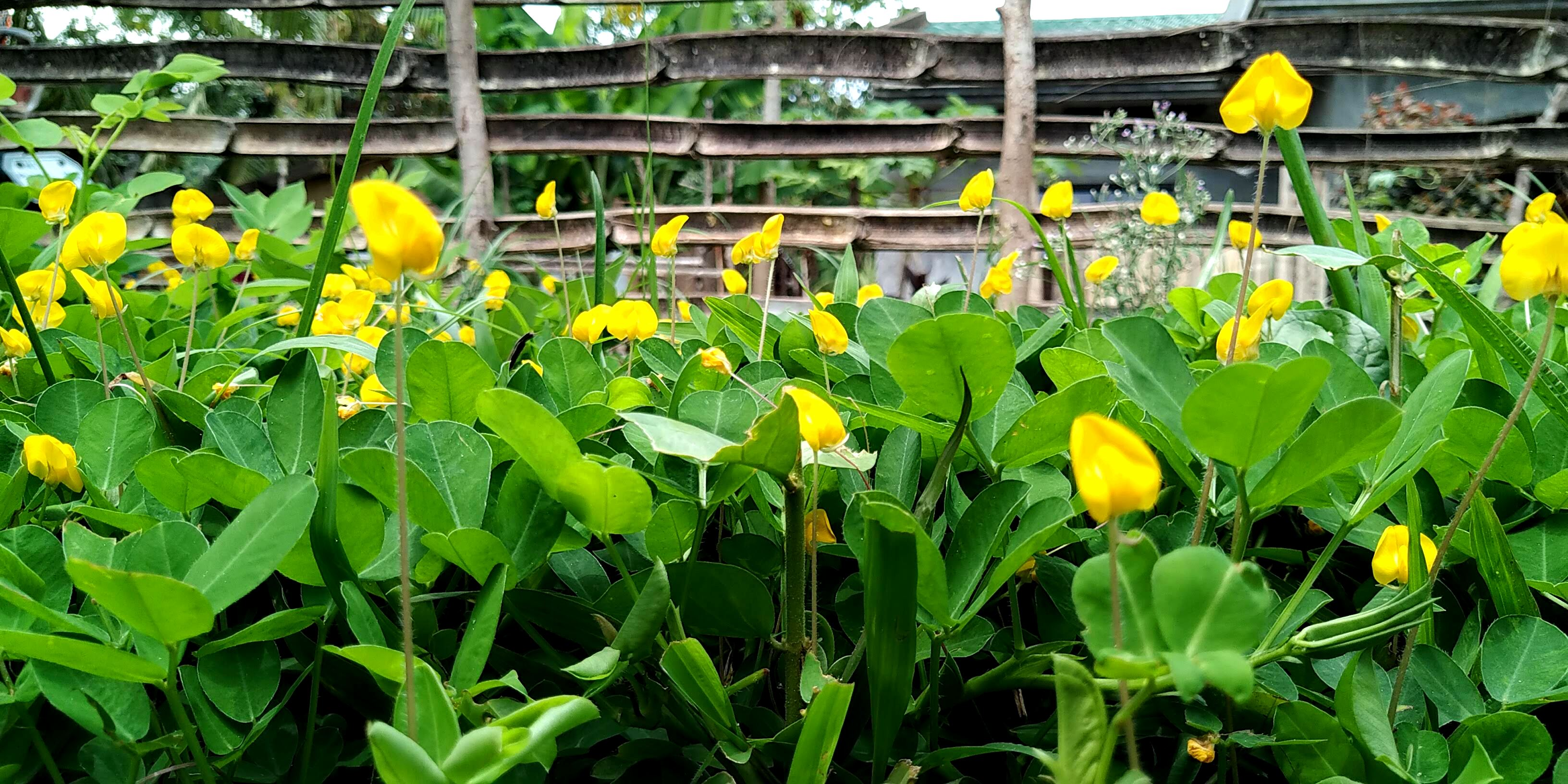
- Arachis pintoi foliage and flower

Scientific classification
- Kingdom: Plantae
- Clade: Tracheophytes
- Clade: Angiosperms
- Clade: Eudicots
- Clade: Rosids
- Order: Fabales
- Family: Fabaceae
- Subfamily: Faboideae
- Genus: Arachis
- Species: A. pintoi

Binomial name
- Arachis pintoi Krapov. & W.C.Gregory

= Arachis pintoi =

Species of legume

Arachis pintoi, the Pinto peanut, is a forage plant native to Cerrado vegetation in Brazil. It is native to the valleys of the upper São Francisco and the Jequitinhonha rivers of Minas Gerais. It has been named after the Brazilian botanist Geraldo Pinto, who first collected the plant at the locality of Boca do Córrego, município de Belmonte (State of Bahia) in 1954 and suggested its potential as a forage. The species has been first described by A. Krapovickas and W. Gregory in 1994.

This wild perennial relative of the groundnut or peanut, has been of increasing importance to pasture improvement in the tropics. Its stoloniferous growth habit, subterranean seed production, high forage quality, and acceptability to grazing cattle are of particular value. It is widely used in tropical grazing systems for ruminant livestock. The most common cultivar was first released in 1989 as cv. 'Amarillo' in Australia. Subsequently, it was released as cv. 'Mani Forrajero Perenne' in Colombia in 1992. It has been widely distributed in the tropics as accession CIAT 17434.

== Description ==
Pinto peanut is a stoloniferous perennial creeping legume that can reach 20-50 cm in height and form dense swards. It is strongly tap-rooted and has many secondary nodulated roots. The stems are initially prostrate and then become ascendant. The leaves are tetrafoliolate. The leaflets are oblong-obovate to obovate in shape, 4.5 cm long x 3.5 cm broad, glabrous and darker green at their upper side and pubescent underneath. The flowers are yellow, borne on short axillary racemes and very similar to groundnut flowers but smaller. Like groundnut, once pollinated, the flower stalks elongate and grow down into the soil, penetrating up to a depth of about 7 cm. The fruit is a terminal underground, one-seeded pod, 1-1.5 cm long and 6-8 mm in diameter. It is found in the upper 10 cm of the soil.

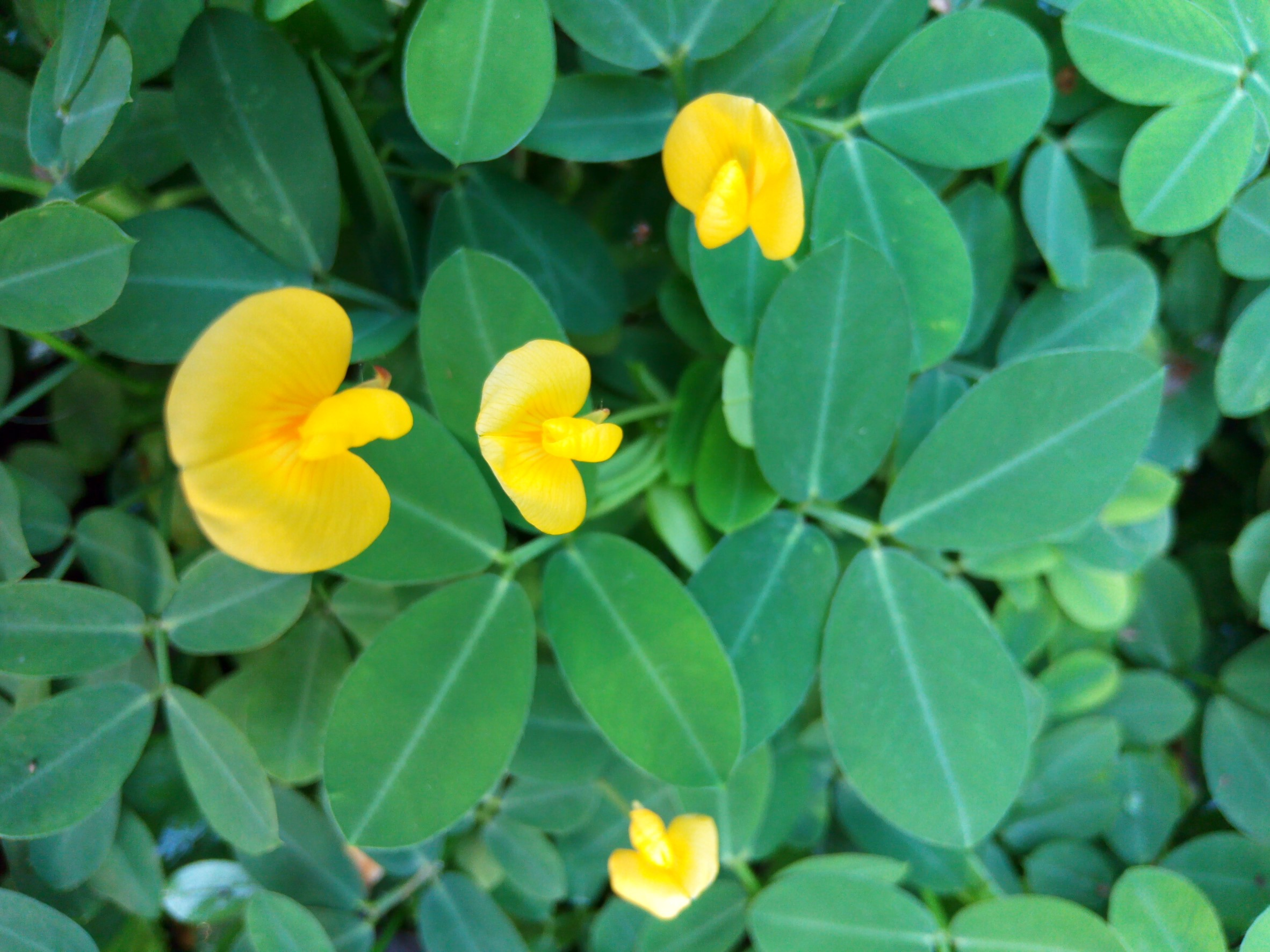
The symmetry of the flower is zygomorph.

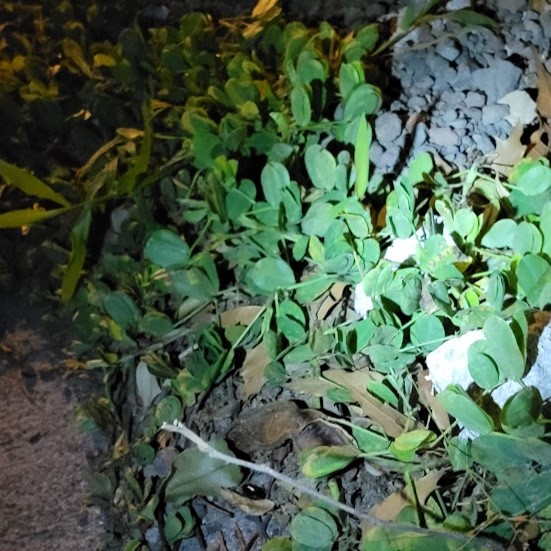
Arachis pintoi at night, displaying nyctinasty
