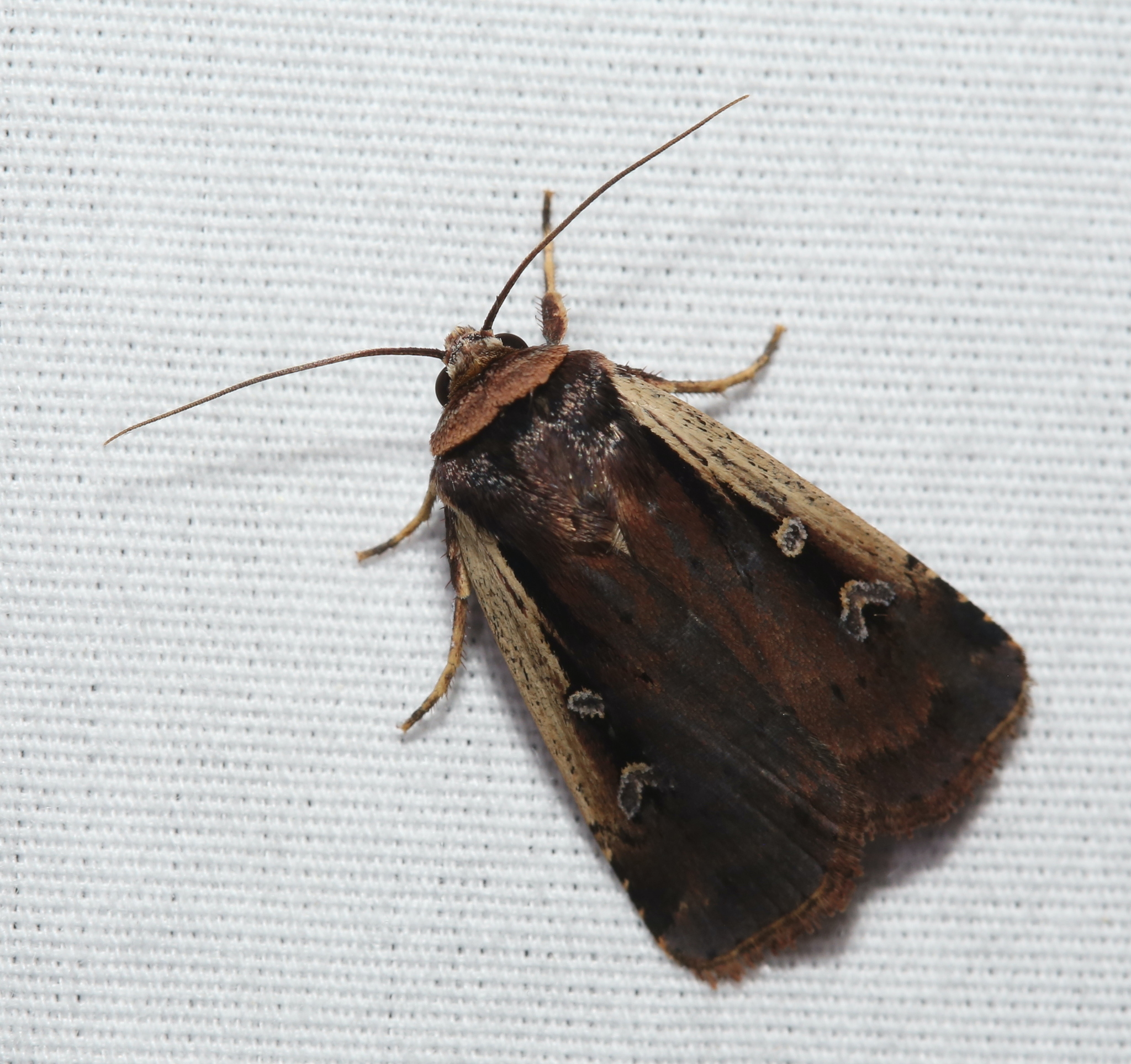

Scientific classification
- Kingdom: Animalia
- Phylum: Arthropoda
- Clade: Pancrustacea
- Class: Insecta
- Order: Lepidoptera
- Superfamily: Noctuoidea
- Family: Noctuidae
- Genus: Ochropleura
- Species: O. implecta

Binomial name
- Ochropleura implecta Lafontaine, 1998

= Ochropleura implecta =

Species of moth

Ochropleura implecta is a moth of the family Noctuidae. It is found from Newfoundland to South Carolina, west to Arizona, north to British Columbia.

This species was described in 1998 by Don Lafontaine, who distinguished it from the very similar Ochropleura plecta which occurs in Europe and Asia.

The wingspan is 25–32 millimetres (0.98–1.26 in). Adults are on wing from April to September. There are two generations per year.

The larvae feed on various plants, including beet, clover, chicory and willow.
