= Arachis correntina =

Scientific classification
- Kingdom: Plantae
- Clade: Tracheophytes
- Clade: Angiosperms
- Clade: Eudicots
- Clade: Rosids
- Order: Fabales
- Family: Fabaceae
- Subfamily: Faboideae
- Genus: Arachis
- Species: A. correntina

Binomial name
- Arachis correntina (Burkart) Krapov. & W.C.Gregory

Species of legume

Arachis correntina (syn. Arachis villosa Benth. var. correntina Burkart) is a herb native to Argentina and Paraguay. This plant is cited as gene sources for research in plant biology of peanut (Arachis hypogaea).
