= Arachis archeri =

Scientific classification
- Kingdom: Plantae
- Clade: Tracheophytes
- Clade: Angiosperms
- Clade: Eudicots
- Clade: Rosids
- Order: Fabales
- Family: Fabaceae
- Subfamily: Faboideae
- Genus: Arachis
- Species: A. archeri

Binomial name
- Arachis archeri Krapov. & W.C.Gregory

Species of legume

Arachis archeri (Portuguese common name: amendoim do campo limpo) is a herb native to Mato Grosso vegetation in Brazil. This plant is cited as gene sources for research in plant biology of peanut (Arachis hypogaea).
