= Arachis batizocoi =

Scientific classification
- Kingdom: Plantae
- Clade: Tracheophytes
- Clade: Angiosperms
- Clade: Eudicots
- Clade: Rosids
- Order: Fabales
- Family: Fabaceae
- Subfamily: Faboideae
- Genus: Arachis
- Species: A. batizocoi

Binomial name
- Arachis batizocoi Krapov. & W.C.Gregory

Species of legume

Arachis batizocoi is a herb native to Bolivia and Paraguay. This plant is cited as gene sources for research in plant biology of peanut (Arachis hypogaea). Arachis batizocoi maintains a divergent genome as well as high fertility that facilitates the upbringing of new and beneficial alleles within peanut crops. Such high crossability has increased the frequency of several advantageous alleles that have improved plant life and agricultural output. Among these are boosted resistance against groundnut yield-limiting diseases such as late leaf spot (LLS) and groundnut rosette disease (GRD), larger seeds, and a higher overall yield.
