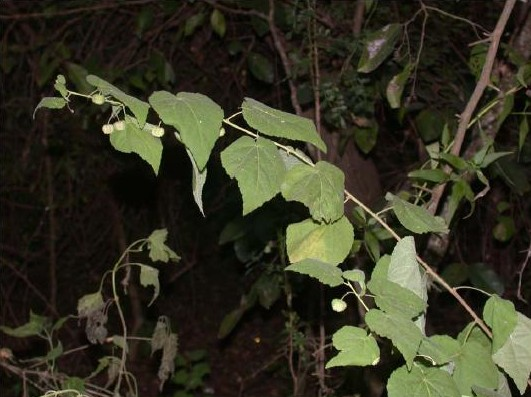

Conservation status
- Imperiled (NatureServe)

Scientific classification
- Kingdom: Plantae
- Clade: Tracheophytes
- Clade: Angiosperms
- Clade: Eudicots
- Clade: Rosids
- Order: Malvales
- Family: Malvaceae
- Genus: Ayenia
- Species: A. limitaris

Binomial name
- Ayenia limitaris Cristóbal

Synonyms
- Nephropetalum pringlei B.L.Rob. & Greenm.

= Ayenia limitaris =

Species of flowering plant

Ayenia limitaris is a rare North American species of flowering plant in the mallow family known by the common names Rio Grande ayenia, Texas ayenia, and Tamaulipan kidneypetal. It is native to an area straddling the Rio Grande in Mexico and the United States. Today it is known from far southern Texas and far northern sections of the Mexican states of Coahuila and Tamaulipas. It has become rare because most of its habitat has been degraded or destroyed.

== Description ==
This is a shrub growing up to 1.5 meters (5 feet) tall. The alternately arranged leaves have hairy heart-shaped blades with toothed edges. The small flowers have pinkish, greenish, or whitish petals. The fruit is a prickly capsule divided into five cells.

== Distribution and habitat ==
The plant's native habitat was made up of subtropical riparian woodland covered in dense thickets in the floodplains of the Rio Grande delta. It is probably adapted to periodic flooding in the area, an event that is largely contained and prevented today. Only about 5% of the natural habitat, the Texas ebony-anacua (Ebenopsis ebano/Ehretia anacua) plant community, remains in this area. the rest has been fenced and fragmented by roads, canals, and ditches, plowed for agricultural use, and compacted by herds of cattle. Introduced plant species such as Guinea grass (Megathyrsus maximus) have taken hold.

== Ecology ==
Metcalfa pruinosa, a true bug, feeds on the plant.

== Conservation ==
There are perhaps four populations remaining in Texas and two in Mexico, for a total of 1000 individual plants at most. It is a federally listed endangered species of the United States.
