= Ayenia sparrei =

Conservation status
- Vulnerable (IUCN 3.1)

Scientific classification
- Kingdom: Plantae
- Clade: Tracheophytes
- Clade: Angiosperms
- Clade: Eudicots
- Clade: Rosids
- Order: Malvales
- Family: Malvaceae
- Genus: Ayenia
- Species: A. sparrei

Binomial name
- Ayenia sparrei (Cristóbal) Christenh. & Byng

Synonyms
- Byttneria sparrei Cristóbal

Species of flowering plant

Ayenia sparrei is a species of flowering plant in the family Malvaceae. It a shrub found only in Ecuador.

== Distribution and habitat ==
Ayenia sparriei is known only from single location, on the dry slopes along the Río Comunidades, between Vilcabamba and Yangana in the Andes of southern Ecuador at 1600 meters elevation. Its natural habitat is subtropical or tropical dry shrubland.

== Conservation ==
It is threatened by habitat loss and fragmentation by deforestation, settlement, and mining.
