= Arachis cardenasii =

Conservation status
- Least Concern (IUCN 3.1)

Scientific classification
- Kingdom: Plantae
- Clade: Tracheophytes
- Clade: Angiosperms
- Clade: Eudicots
- Clade: Rosids
- Order: Fabales
- Family: Fabaceae
- Subfamily: Faboideae
- Genus: Arachis
- Species: A. cardenasii

Binomial name
- Arachis cardenasii Krapov. & W.C.Gregory

Species of legume

Arachis cardenasii is a herb in the Fabaceae family. This plant is cited as gene sources for research in plant biology of peanut (Arachis hypogaea); for example, Cercospora leaf spot resistance.
