= Ayenia minytricha =

Conservation status
- Critically Endangered (IUCN 3.1)

Scientific classification
- Kingdom: Plantae
- Clade: Tracheophytes
- Clade: Angiosperms
- Clade: Eudicots
- Clade: Rosids
- Order: Malvales
- Family: Malvaceae
- Genus: Ayenia
- Species: A. minytricha

Binomial name
- Ayenia minytricha (Cristóbal) Christenh. & Byng

Synonyms
- Byttneria minytricha Cristóbal

Species of flowering plant

Ayenia minytricha is a species of flowering plant in the family Malvaceae. It is native to Ecuador and western Bolivia. Its natural habitat is subtropical or tropical moist montane forests from 1,000 to 1,500 meters elevation.
