= Ayenia loxensis =

Conservation status
- Endangered (IUCN 3.1)

Scientific classification
- Kingdom: Plantae
- Clade: Tracheophytes
- Clade: Angiosperms
- Clade: Eudicots
- Clade: Rosids
- Order: Malvales
- Family: Malvaceae
- Genus: Ayenia
- Species: A. loxensis

Binomial name
- Ayenia loxensis (Cristóbal) Christenh. & Byng

Synonyms
- Byttneria loxensis Cristóbal

Species of flowering plant

Ayenia loxensis is a species of flowering plant in the family Malvaceae. It is found only in Ecuador. Its natural habitat is subtropical or tropical dry shrubland.
