= Arachis lutescens =

Scientific classification
- Kingdom: Plantae
- Clade: Tracheophytes
- Clade: Angiosperms
- Clade: Eudicots
- Clade: Rosids
- Order: Fabales
- Family: Fabaceae
- Subfamily: Faboideae
- Genus: Arachis
- Species: A. lutescens

Binomial name
- Arachis lutescens Krapov. & Rigoni

Species of plant

Arachis lutescens is a species of flowering plant in the family Fabaceae. It is native to the seasonally dry tropics of west-central and southeastern Brazil. A perennial, it prefers to grow in periodically flooded gravelly soils. Its chloroplast genome has been sequenced.
