= Ayenia asplundii =

Conservation status
- Endangered (IUCN 3.1)

Scientific classification
- Kingdom: Plantae
- Clade: Tracheophytes
- Clade: Angiosperms
- Clade: Eudicots
- Clade: Rosids
- Order: Malvales
- Family: Malvaceae
- Genus: Ayenia
- Species: A. asplundii

Binomial name
- Ayenia asplundii (Cristóbal) Christenh. & Byng

Synonyms
- Byttneria asplundii Cristóbal

Species of flowering plant

Ayenia asplundii is a species of flowering plant in the family Malvaceae. It is native to Ecuador and Peru. Its natural habitats are subtropical or tropical dry forests, subtropical or tropical moist lowland forests, and subtropical or tropical moist montane forests, from sea level to 2,000 meters elevation.
