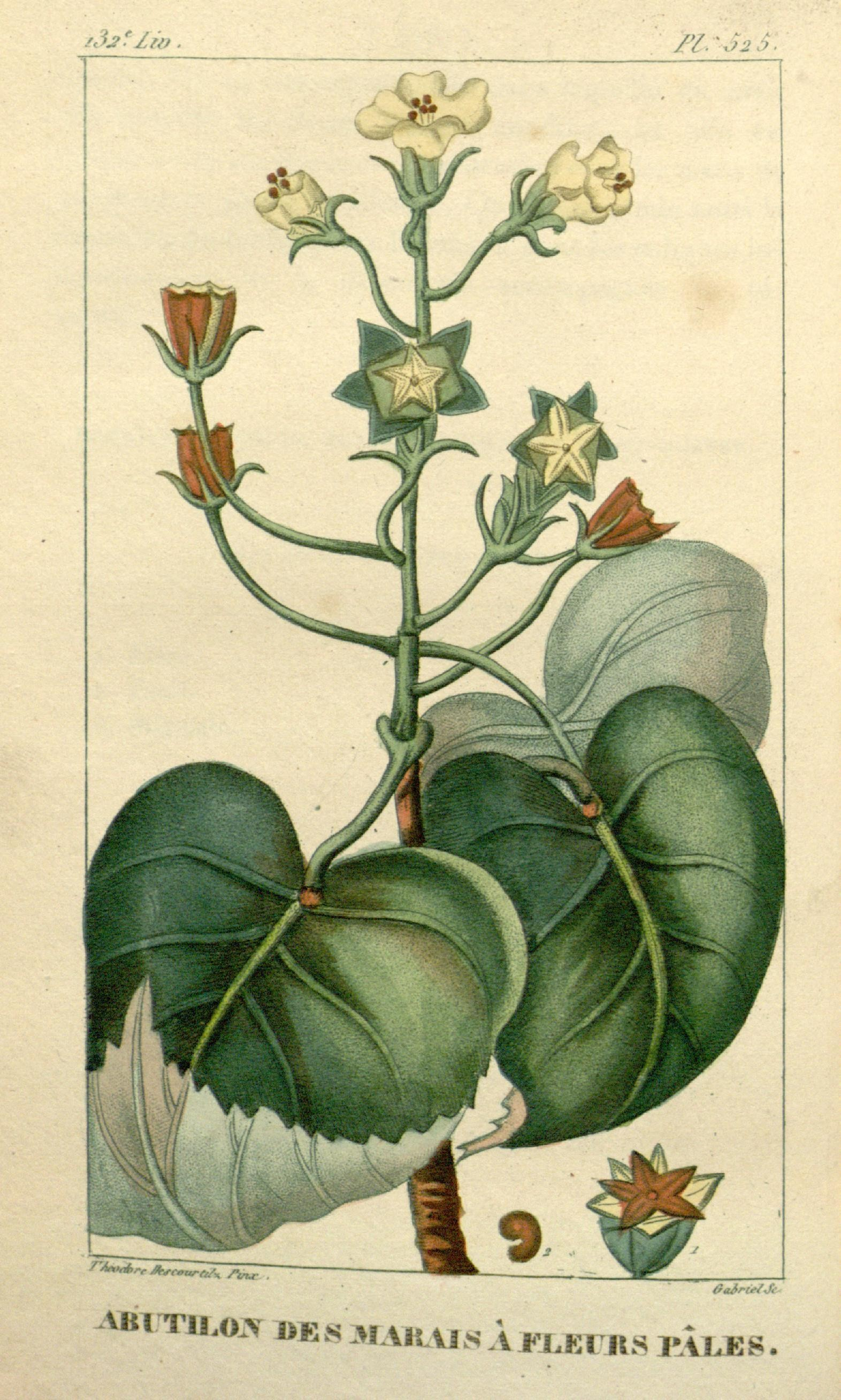
- Botanical illustration of Sida pyramidata (now Allosidastrum pyramidatum), 1829

Scientific classification
- Kingdom: Plantae
- Clade: Tracheophytes
- Clade: Angiosperms
- Clade: Eudicots
- Clade: Rosids
- Order: Malvales
- Family: Malvaceae
- Subfamily: Malvoideae
- Tribe: Malveae
- Genus: Allosidastrum (Hochr.) Krapov., Fryxell & D.M.Bates

= Allosidastrum =

Genus of flowering plants

Allosidastrum is a New World genus comprising four species in the tribe Malveae in the family Malvaceae. Members of the genus are woody, bearing ovate leaves with long petioles. Flowers - borne without calyculi - bear small, basally rounded calyxes of a length greater than that of their pedicels and whitish or palely yellow petals. Gynoeciums each consist of five to nine carpels and mature into fruits that yield one seed for each of their carpels.

== Species ==
As of October 2022, Plants of the World Online recognised the following species:

- Allosidastrum dolichophyllum Krapov., Fryxell & D.M.Bates
- Allosidastrum hilarianum (C.Presl) Krapov., Fryxell & D.M.Bates
- Allosidastrum interruptum (Balb. ex DC.) Krapov., Fryxell & D.M.Bates
- Allosidastrum pyramidatum (Desp. ex Cav.) Krapov., Fryxell & D.M.Bates
