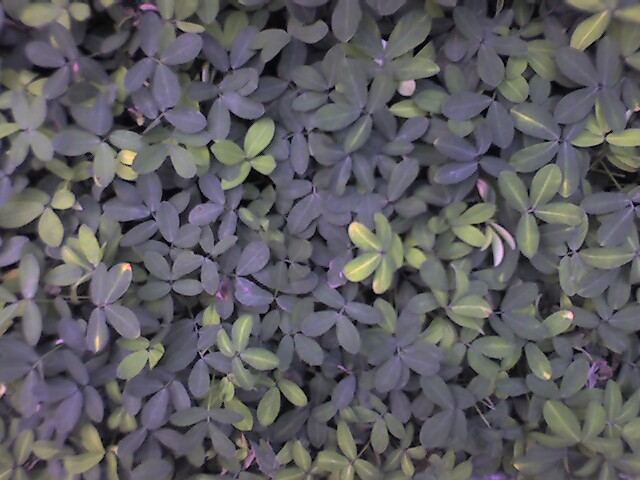

Scientific classification
- Kingdom: Plantae
- Clade: Tracheophytes
- Clade: Angiosperms
- Clade: Eudicots
- Clade: Rosids
- Order: Fabales
- Family: Fabaceae
- Subfamily: Faboideae
- Genus: Arachis
- Species: A. repens

Binomial name
- Arachis repens Handro

= Arachis repens =

Species of legume

Arachis repens (Portuguese common name: grama-amendoim, ″peanut grass″) is a species in the family Fabaceae native to Brazil. This plant is often used as a forage and ornamental plant.
