= Arachis rigonii =

Conservation status
- Extinct in the Wild (IUCN 3.1)

Scientific classification
- Kingdom: Plantae
- Clade: Tracheophytes
- Clade: Angiosperms
- Clade: Eudicots
- Clade: Rosids
- Order: Fabales
- Family: Fabaceae
- Subfamily: Faboideae
- Genus: Arachis
- Species: A. rigonii

Binomial name
- Arachis rigonii Krapov. & W.C.Greg.
- Distribution; Extinct

Species of plant

Arachis rigonii is a species of plant in the family Fabaceae. The species is native to Bolivia. The species was assessed for the IUCN Red List of Threatened Species as extinct in the wild.
