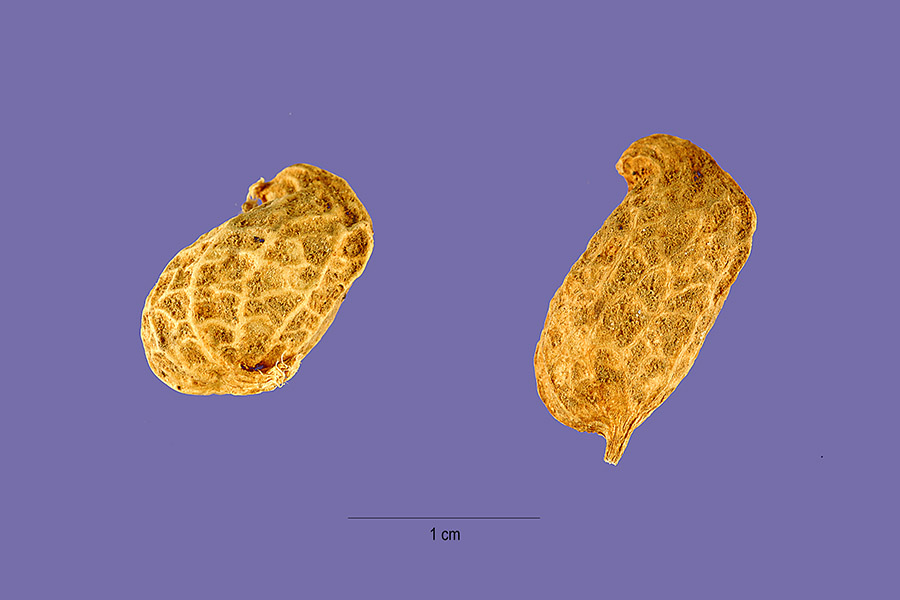

Scientific classification
- Kingdom: Plantae
- Clade: Tracheophytes
- Clade: Angiosperms
- Clade: Eudicots
- Clade: Rosids
- Order: Fabales
- Family: Fabaceae
- Subfamily: Faboideae
- Genus: Arachis
- Species: A. monticola

Binomial name
- Arachis monticola Krapov. & Rigoni

= Arachis monticola =

Species of legume

Arachis monticola is a close relative of the domesticated peanut (Arachis hypogaea). Besides the peanut, it is the only other tetraploid species in the genus Arachis. It is thought to be the immediate wild ancestor of peanut, although it may be a weedy form, descended from cultivated peanuts.
