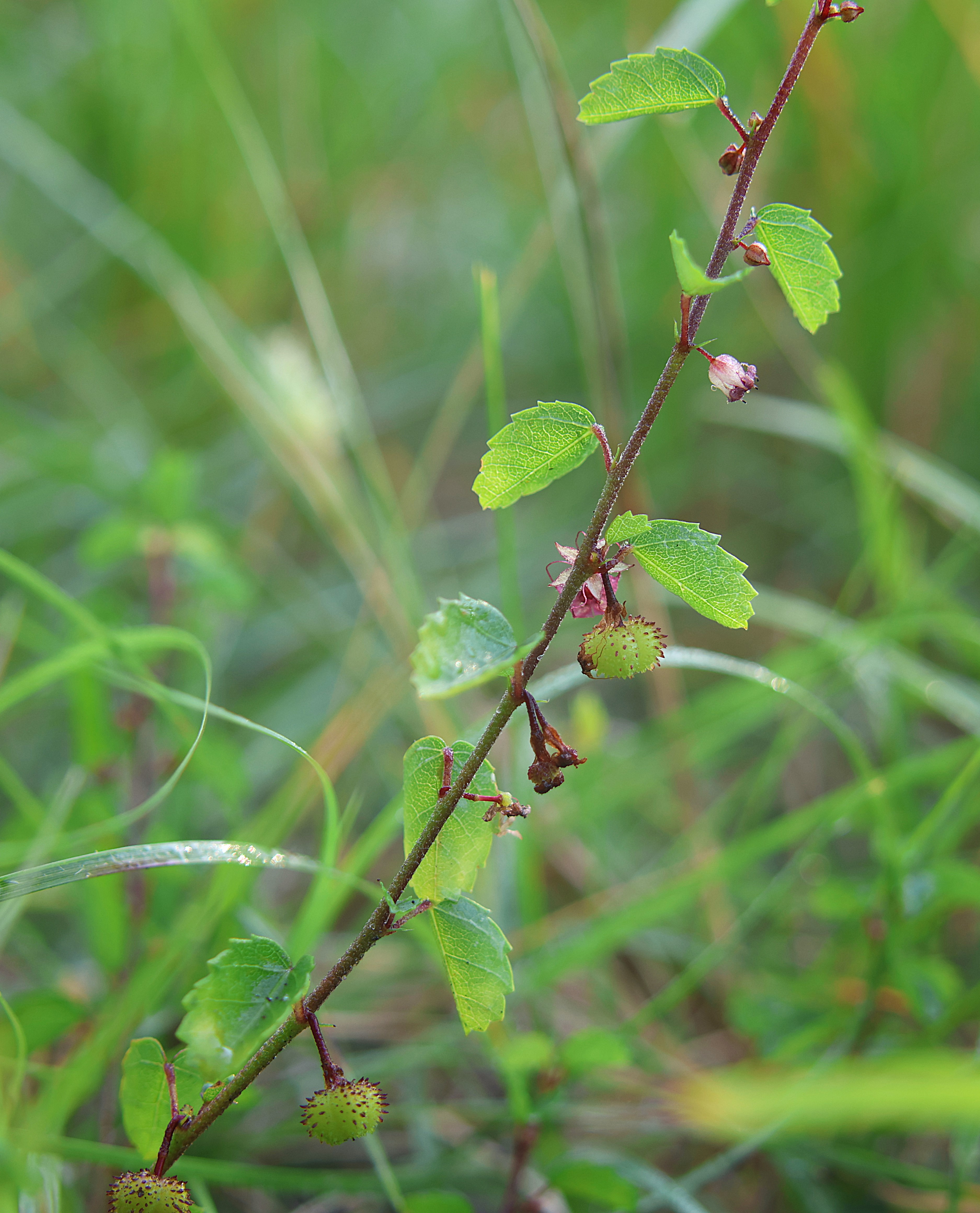
- Growing on calcareous roadside in Hernando County, Florida

Conservation status
- Vulnerable (NatureServe)

Scientific classification
- Kingdom: Plantae
- Clade: Tracheophytes
- Clade: Angiosperms
- Clade: Eudicots
- Clade: Rosids
- Order: Malvales
- Family: Malvaceae
- Genus: Ayenia
- Species: A. euphrasiifolia

Binomial name
- Ayenia euphrasiifolia Griseb.

= Ayenia euphrasiifolia =

Species of flowering plant

Ayenia euphrasiifolia, commonly referred to as eyebright ayenia, is a species of flowering plant native to certain areas of south and central Florida. It may also be found in Cuba, where the type specimen was collected, and possibly other parts of the Caribbean.

== Habitat ==
In Florida, it occurs in calcareous habitats including pine rockland, marl prairie, and disturbed areas over limestone. The populations in Florida are recognized as a subspecies under Ayenia euphrasiifolia var. euphrasiifolia. The populations in Cuba are recognized to consist of two other subspecies.

== Conservation ==
The species' primary risk seems to be its constrained habitat and relatively low abundance.
