= Arachis diogoi =

Scientific classification
- Kingdom: Plantae
- Clade: Tracheophytes
- Clade: Angiosperms
- Clade: Eudicots
- Clade: Rosids
- Order: Fabales
- Family: Fabaceae
- Subfamily: Faboideae
- Genus: Arachis
- Species: A. diogoi

Binomial name
- Arachis diogoi Hoehne

Species of legume

Arachis diogoi (syn. Arachis chacoense Krapov. & W.Gregory, Arachis villosa Benth. subsp. diogoi (Hoehne) A.Chev.) is a perennial herb found in Africa, Indian Ocean and South America. This plant is cited as gene sources for research in plant biology of peanut (Arachis hypogaea).
