= Ayenia flexuosa =

Conservation status
- Endangered (IUCN 3.1)

Scientific classification
- Kingdom: Plantae
- Clade: Tracheophytes
- Clade: Angiosperms
- Clade: Eudicots
- Clade: Rosids
- Order: Malvales
- Family: Malvaceae
- Genus: Ayenia
- Species: A. flexuosa

Binomial name
- Ayenia flexuosa (Killip) Christenh. & Byng

Synonyms
- Byttneria flexuosa Killip

Species of flowering plant

Ayenia flexuosa is a species of flowering plant in the family Malvaceae. It a shrub or tree found only in Ecuador. Its natural habitat is tropical moist montane forests from 2,500 to 3,000 meters elevation.
