= Ayenia zhangpuensis =

Ayenia zhangpuensis Temporal range: 14.7 Ma Middle Miocene

Scientific classification
- Kingdom: Plantae
- Clade: Tracheophytes
- Clade: Angiosperms
- Clade: Eudicots
- Clade: Rosids
- Order: Malvales
- Family: Malvaceae
- Genus: Ayenia
- Species: †A. zhangpuensis

Binomial name
- †Ayenia zhangpuensis

Fossil species of flowering plant

Ayenia zhangpuensis is a fossil species in the family Malvaceae from the Middle Miocene of southeast China.

== Description ==
The pentamerous, actinomorphic, pedicellate, bisexual, 4.3 mm long, and 4.8 mm wide flower has a slim, densely pubescent, 1.4 mm long pedicel bearing stellate trichomes. The 5 pubescent, elongate, incurved, 3.1 mm long, and 1.3 mm wide sepals are basally fused. The 5 clawed petals are free. The pentamerous androecium is composed of 5 fertile stamens and 5 staminodes with partially fused filaments forming a 0.7 mm long, and 1 mm wide campanulate staminal tube. The syncarpous gynoecium is composed of 5 fused carpels that form a superior, sessile, globose, verrucose, 0.8 mm long, and 0.6 mm wide ovary bearing a slim, 0.3 mm long, and 0.1 mm wide, five-ribbed style with a five-lobed stigma.

== Taxonomy ==
It was described in 2026. The type specimen, a flower preserved in amber, was collected from sedimentary rocks from the middle Miocene in Zhangpu County, Fujian, southeast China. It is placed in the section Ayenia sect. Vahihara.

=== Etymology ===
The specific epithet zhangpuensis refers to Zhangpu County, Fujian Province, southeast China, where the species was discovered.

== Distribution and habitat ==
It occurred 15 million years ago in a tropical rainforest habitat in Southeast China.
