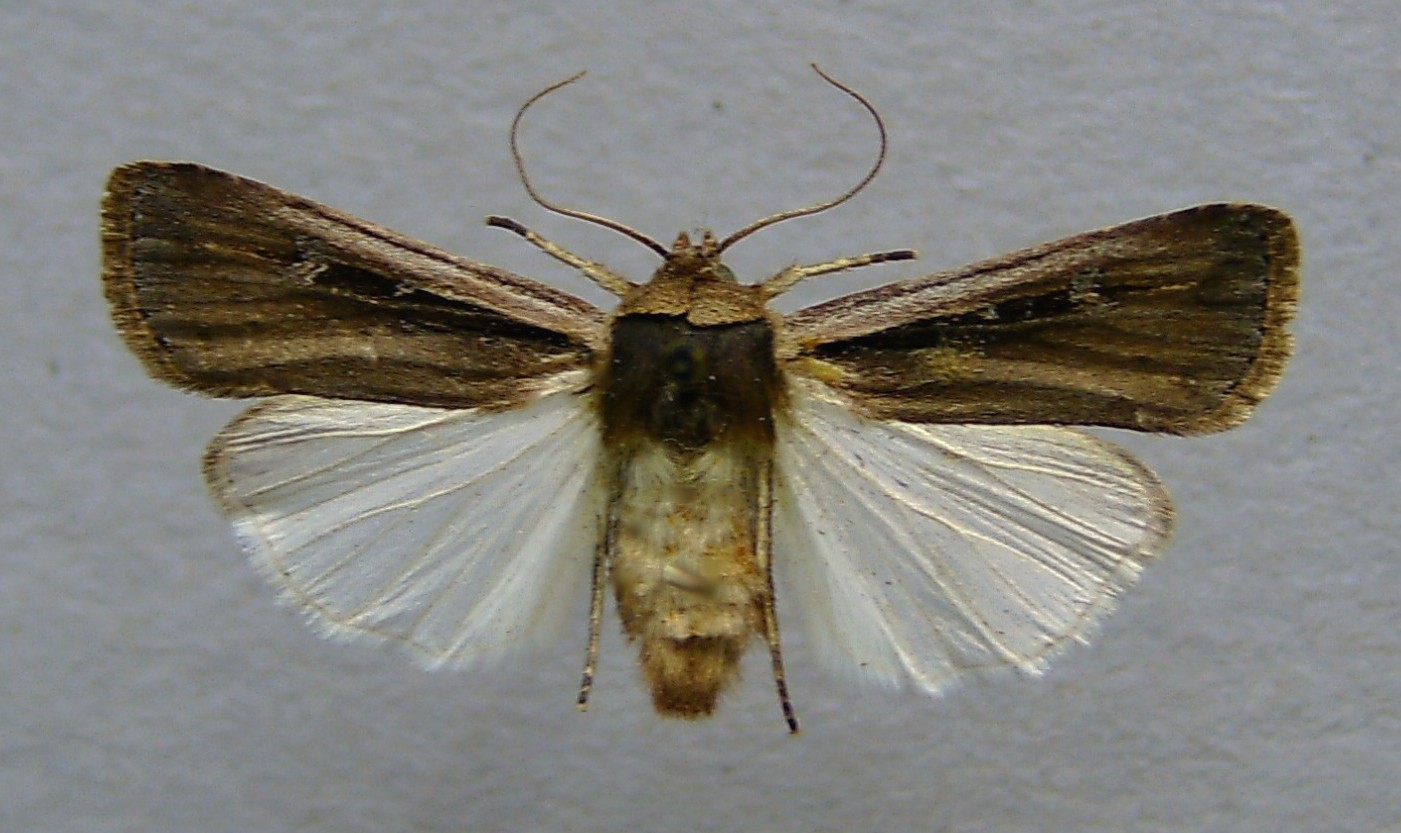
- Ochropleura leucogaster

Scientific classification
- Kingdom: Animalia
- Phylum: Arthropoda
- Clade: Pancrustacea
- Class: Insecta
- Order: Lepidoptera
- Superfamily: Noctuoidea
- Family: Noctuidae
- Tribe: Noctuini
- Genus: Ochropleura; Hübner, 1821

= Ochropleura =

Genus of insects

Ochropleura is a genus of moths of the family Noctuidae described by Jacob Hübner in 1821.

== Species ==
- Ochropleura carthalina (Christoph, 1893)
- Ochropleura clarivena (Püngeler, 1900)
- Ochropleura costalis Moore, 1867
- Ochropleura creatochroa Krüger, 2005
- Ochropleura danilevskyi Shchetkin, 1965
- Ochropleura debtera Laporte, 1977
- Ochropleura distriata Krüger, 2005
- Ochropleura draesekei (Corti, 1928)
- Ochropleura elbursica (Draudt, 1937)
- Ochropleura elevata Viette, 1958
- Ochropleura gaedei Berio, 1972
- Ochropleura geochroides Boursin, 1948
- Ochropleura ignota Swinhoe, 1889 (possibly a synonym for Ochropleura plecta)
- Ochropleura implecta Lafontaine, 1998
- Ochropleura leucogaster (Freyer, 1831)
- Ochropleura marojejy Viette, 1961
- Ochropleura megaplecta (de Joannis, 1932)
- Ochropleura mentaxys Berio, 1972
- Ochropleura ngariensis Chen, 1982
- Ochropleura nivisparsa (Butler, 1889)
- Ochropleura plecta Linnaeus, 1761 – flame shoulder
- Ochropleura portieri Viette, 1967
- Ochropleura pseudogaster Berio, 1974
- Ochropleura reductistriga Krüger, 2005
- Ochropleura rufulana Laporte, 1973
- Ochropleura senescens (Berio, 1962)
- Ochropleura sidamona Laporte, 1977
- Ochropleura spinosoides Poole, 1989
- Ochropleura subplumbea (Staudinger, 1895)
- Ochropleura vicaria Walker, 1857
- Ochropleura vietteana Plante, 1979
- Ochropleura viettei D. S. Fletcher, 1961
