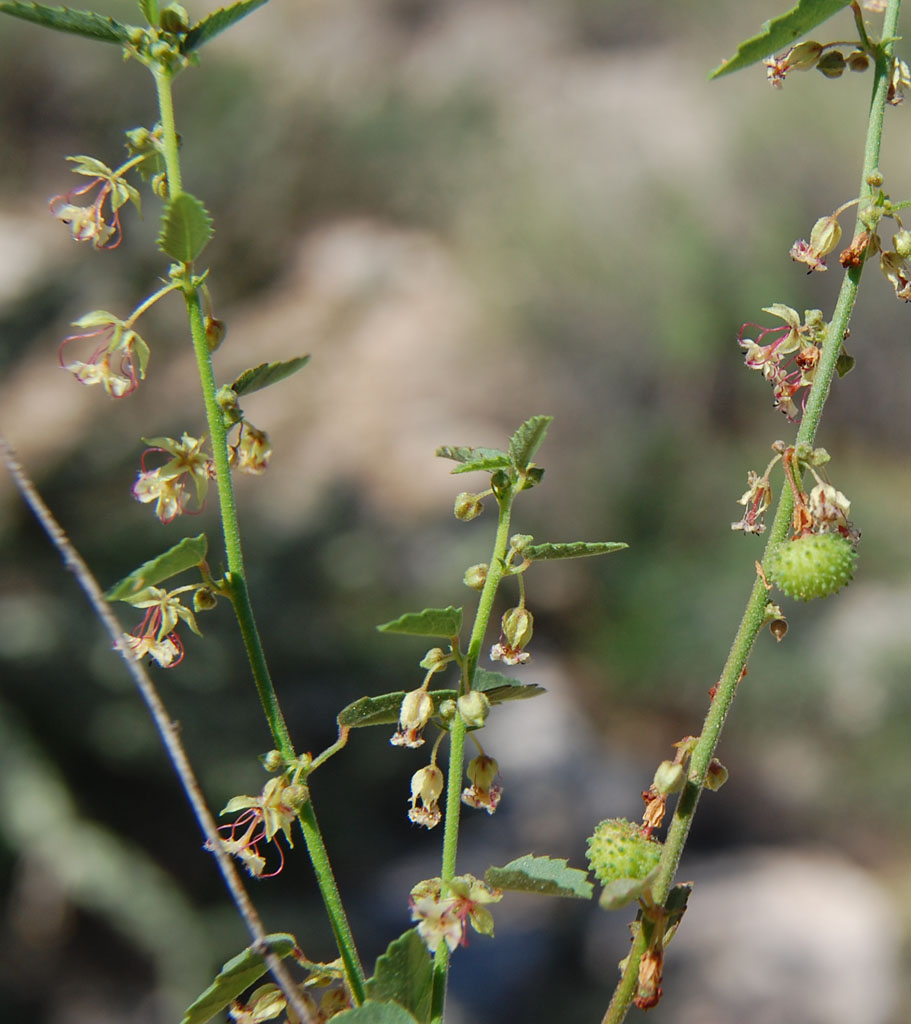

Conservation status
- Apparently Secure (NatureServe)

Scientific classification
- Kingdom: Plantae
- Clade: Tracheophytes
- Clade: Angiosperms
- Clade: Eudicots
- Clade: Rosids
- Order: Malvales
- Family: Malvaceae
- Genus: Ayenia
- Species: A. compacta

Binomial name
- Ayenia compacta Rose

Synonyms
- Ayenia californica

= Ayenia compacta =

Species of flowering plant

Ayenia compacta is a species of shrub in the mallow family known by the common name California ayenia.

It is native to California, Arizona, and Baja California, in the Sonoran Desert and its Colorado Desert, and in the sky islands of the Mojave Desert.

== Description ==
Ayenia compacta is a small shrub producing many erect, branching stems up to 40 centimeters (16 in) tall from a taproot. The sparse leaves are oval in shape and edged in dull teeth.

The flowers appear in the leaf axils. Each has upcurled sepals in one layer and downcurled petals in a layer just above. Each petal has a threadlike claw.

The capsule fruit is a purple-tinted yellow sphere about half a centimeter wide.
