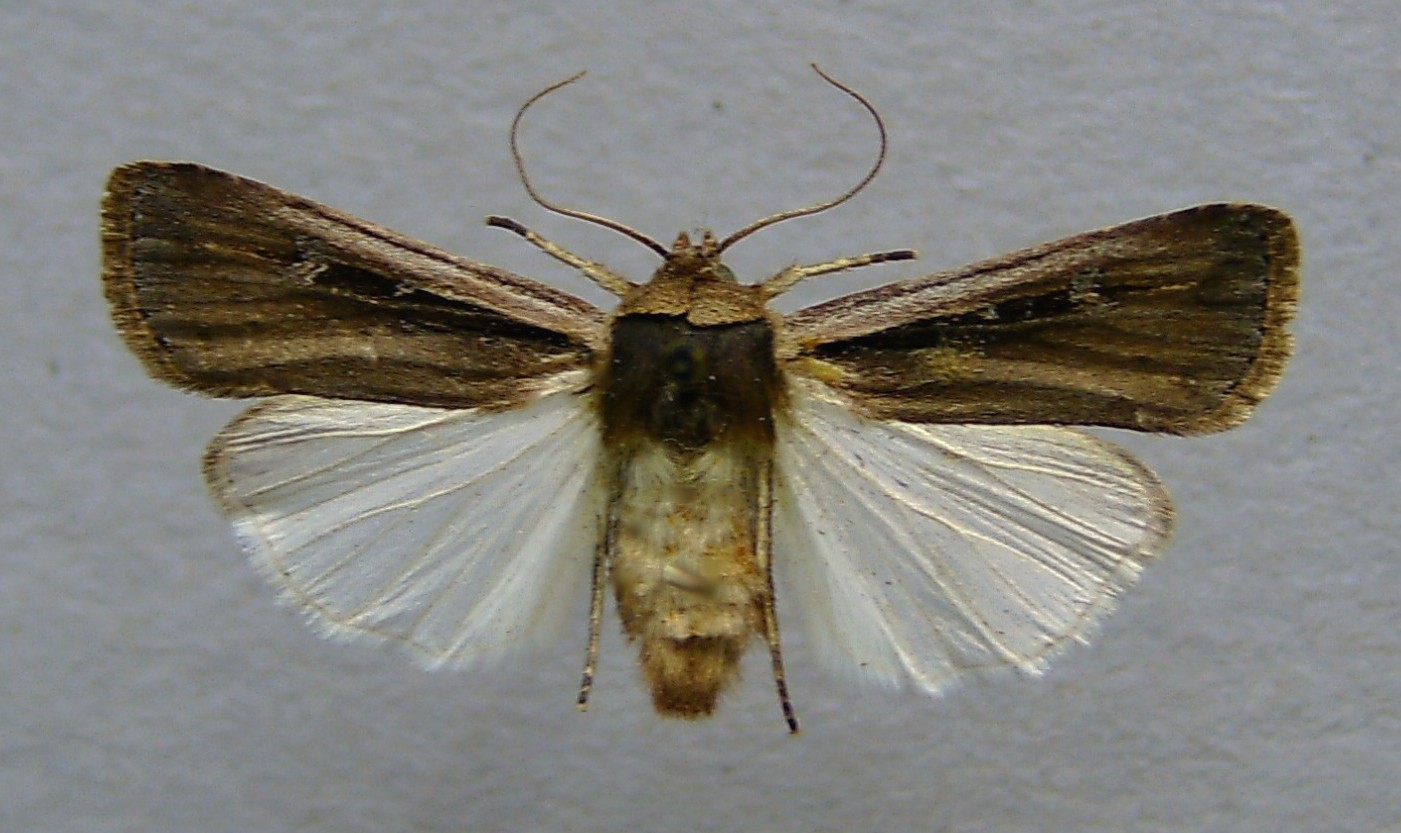

Scientific classification
- Kingdom: Animalia
- Phylum: Arthropoda
- Class: Insecta
- Order: Lepidoptera
- Superfamily: Noctuoidea
- Family: Noctuidae
- Genus: Ochropleura
- Species: O. leucogaster

Binomial name
- Ochropleura leucogaster (Freyer, 1831)

Synonyms
- Noctua leucogaster; Agrotis leucogaster; Rhyacia leucogaster

= Ochropleura leucogaster =

Radford's flame shoulder

Species of moth

Ochropleura leucogaster, or Radford's flame shoulder, is a moth of the family Noctuidae. The species was first described by Christian Friedrich Freyer in 1831. It is found near the Mediterranean Sea, southern Europe, Turkey, Lebanon, Israel, North Africa and southern Africa as well as on some islands of the Indian Ocean. It is believed to be extinct in Great Britain unlike O. plecta.

== Description ==
The wingspan is 32–36 mm. The very narrow forewings are usually dark brown in colour and relatively unmarked. The edge of the costal has a broad, straight, light brown stripe from the base to just behind the indistinct kidney blemish. Ring and kidney blemishes are often thinly outlined in white. Occasionally, a yellowish line can be seen on the forewings.

The caterpillar is brownish-grey in colour and has fine whitish dorsal and secondary dorsal lines as well as a broad, yellowish lateral stripe.

The pupa measures 13.5 to 16 millimetres in length and 4.5 to 6 mm in width. It is dark brown in colour, with the rear edges of segments A3 to A6 tending to red. The integument is strongly roughened on the head, thorax and wing appendages, somewhat less rough on the other appendages of the head/thorax area. The abdomen is generally rough and strongly punctured. The cremaster is finely roughened and has two fork-shaped, longer spikes (0.5 to 0.6 mm) with blunt ends and four shorter.

== Biology ==
Adults are on wing from April to May depending on the location. There are two generations per year.

The larvae feed on various herbaceous plants, Scrophulariaceae, Balsaminaceae and Ericaceae
