= Ayenia ivorensis =

Conservation status
- Extinct (IUCN 3.1)

Scientific classification
- Kingdom: Plantae
- Clade: Tracheophytes
- Clade: Angiosperms
- Clade: Eudicots
- Clade: Rosids
- Order: Malvales
- Family: Malvaceae
- Genus: Ayenia
- Species: †A. ivorensis

Binomial name
- †Ayenia ivorensis (N. Hallé) Christenh. & Byng

Synonyms
- Byttneria ivorensis N.Hallé

Extinct species of flowering plant

Ayenia ivorensis is a tree in the family Malvaceae that is now classified as extinct. It was identified from a single herbarium specimen collected in the Upper Guinean forests of Ivory Coast.
