= Instituto de Botánica del Nordeste =

Herbarium in Argentina

Coordinates: 27°27′34″S 58°49′26″W

The Instituto de Botánica del Nordeste, or Ibone, is a large botanical institute at the National University of the Northeast and major regional herbarium which contains over 400,000 plant specimens from northeastern Argentina and neighboring countries. It was founded by Ing. Agr. Antonio Krapovickas and Dr. Carmen L. Cristóbal, husband and wife, who started the collection at over 250,000 specimens with the help of students whom they trained. Some of these students who now stand out professionally include: Aveliano Fernández, Camilo Quarín, Guillermo Norrmann, Silvia Ferrucci, and Viviana Solís-Neffa, among others.
