= Ayenia elegans =

Scientific classification
- Kingdom: Plantae
- Clade: Tracheophytes
- Clade: Angiosperms
- Clade: Eudicots
- Clade: Rosids
- Order: Malvales
- Family: Malvaceae
- Genus: Ayenia
- Species: A. elegans

Binomial name
- Ayenia elegans (Ridl.) Deroliya & S.L.Meena

Synonyms
- Ayenia indica Christenh. & Byng; Byttneria elegans Ridl.; Byttneria pilosa Roxb.; Byttneria pilosa var. pellita Gagnep.; Chaetaea pilosa (Roxb.) Adelb.; Commersonia pilosa G.Don

Species of flowering plant

Ayenia elegans is a species of flowering plant in the family Malvaceae. It is native to southeastern Asia, including Bangladesh, Myanmar, south-central China (Yunnan), eastern India (Assam and neighboring states), Laos, Thailand, Vietnam, and Peninsular Malaysia.
