= Arachis ipaensis =

Conservation status
- Critically endangered, possibly extinct (IUCN 3.1)

Scientific classification
- Kingdom: Plantae
- Clade: Embryophytes
- Clade: Tracheophytes
- Clade: Spermatophytes
- Clade: Angiosperms
- Clade: Eudicots
- Clade: Rosids
- Order: Fabales
- Family: Fabaceae
- Subfamily: Faboideae
- Genus: Arachis
- Species: A. ipaensis

Binomial name
- Arachis ipaensis Krapov. & W.C. Greg.

Species of legume

Arachis ipaensis is a herb in the Faboideae subfamily. It is endemic to Bolivia. This plant is cited as gene sources for research in plant biology of peanut (Arachis hypogaea). Its genome has been sequenced.

Arachis ipaensis is only known from its type locality, Ipa near Villamontes, where it was collected in 1977. It was growing on top of the cliffs of a gorge among bromeliads. Surveys in 1994–2013 failed to find any specimens. Nonetheless, it is conserved in several international gene banks.
