= Arachis villosulicarpa =

Scientific classification
- Kingdom: Plantae
- Clade: Tracheophytes
- Clade: Angiosperms
- Clade: Eudicots
- Clade: Rosids
- Order: Fabales
- Family: Fabaceae
- Subfamily: Faboideae
- Genus: Arachis
- Species: A. villosulicarpa

Binomial name
- Arachis villosulicarpa Hoehne

Species of plant

Arachis villosulicarpa is a perennial peanut species, which is cultivated by indigenous people in Mato Grosso, a state of Brazil. Its wild progenitor is thought to be Arachis pietrarellii. Although it is related to the common peanut, Arachis hypogaea, it was separately domesticated: A. villosulicarpa is diploid, whereas A. hypogaea is tetraploid.

It is one of several species that might be used as gene source for plant breeding to improve the important cultivated peanut Arachis hypogaea.
