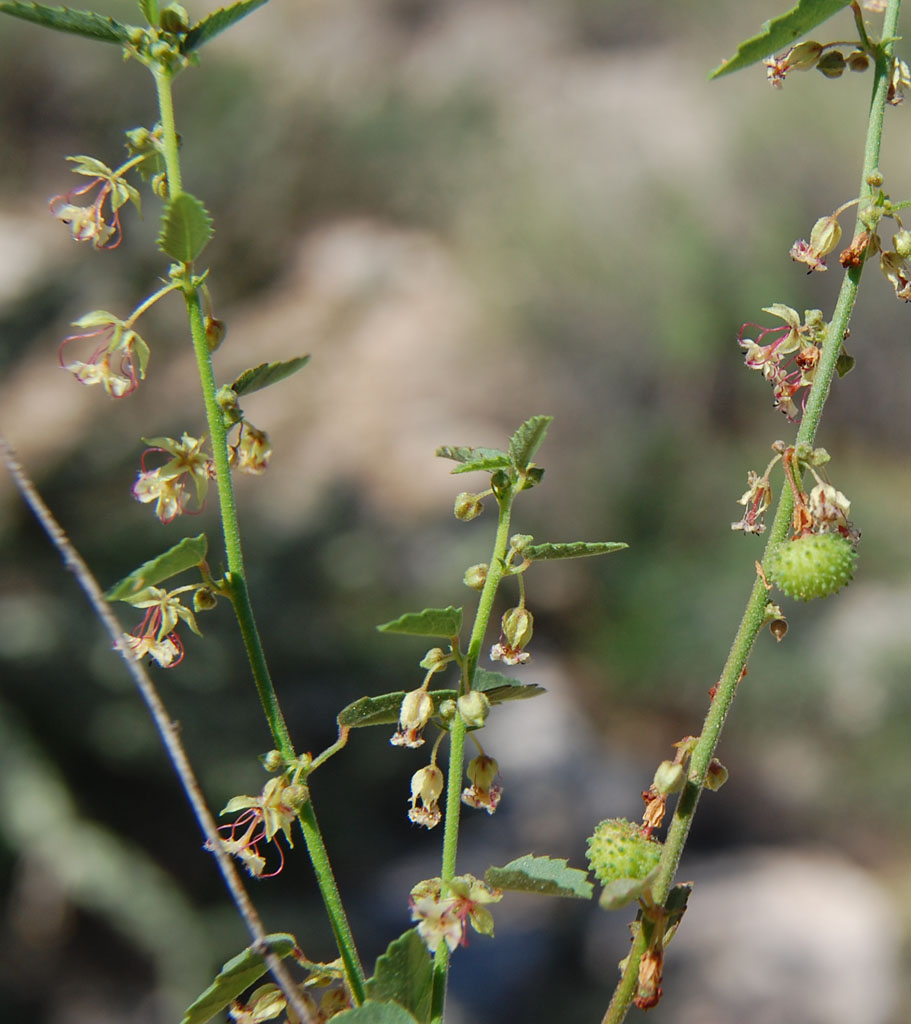
- Ayenia compacta

Scientific classification
- Kingdom: Plantae
- Clade: Tracheophytes
- Clade: Angiosperms
- Clade: Eudicots
- Clade: Rosids
- Order: Malvales
- Family: Malvaceae
- Subfamily: Byttnerioideae
- Tribe: Byttnerieae
- Genus: Ayenia; L.

Species
- 217; See text

Synonyms
- Buettneria L.; Byttneria Loefl.; Chaetaea Jacq.; Cybiostigma Turcz.; Dayena Adans.; Dayena Monier ex Mill.; Heterophyllum Bojer ex Hook.; Lorentzia Hieron.; Nephropetalum B.L.Rob. & Greenm.; Pentaceros G.Mey.; Rayleya Cristóbal; Telfairia F.Newman ex Hook.; Watsonia Boehm.

= Ayenia =

Genus of flowering plants

Ayenia is a genus of flowering plants in the mallow family, Malvaceae. It includes 216 species of subshrubs, shrubs, small trees, and lianas. They are native to the tropical Americas and southwestern United States, tropical Africa, and tropical Asia.

== Description ==
Ayenia includes subshrubs, shrubs, small trees, and lianas. The genus is distinguished by its tiny yet extraordinarily complex flowers.

== Taxonomy ==
Ayenia, Byttneria, and Rayleya were formerly described as separate genera, with Ayenia having a Neotropical distribution, Byttneria as a Pantropical genus, and Rayleya as a monotypic genus with a single Brazilian species, Rayleya bahiensis. A phylogenetic analysis found that Byttneria was paraphyletic and Ayenia was nested within it, and Rayleya was a sister clade to the others. In 2018 Christenhusz and Byng transferred the Byttneria and Rayleya names to Ayenia, which had nomenclatural priority.

=== Species ===
217 species are currently accepted.

- Ayenia abutilifolia (Turcz.) Turcz.
- Ayenia abutiloides (A.St.-Hil. & Naudin) Christenh. & Byng
- Ayenia acalyphifolia Griseb.
- Ayenia aculeata (Jacq.) Christenh. & Byng
- Ayenia acuminata Rusby
- Ayenia aemulata Cristóbal
- Ayenia affinis (Pohl) Christenh. & Byng
- Ayenia albiflora Colli-Silva & I.L.Morais
- Ayenia aliculata Cristóbal
- Ayenia ambongensis (Arènes) Christenh. & Byng
- Ayenia ancistrodonta (Mildbr.) Christenh. & Byng
- Ayenia andamensis (Kurz) Christenh. & Byng
- Ayenia angulata (Hassk.) ined.
- Ayenia angustifolia A.St.-Hil. & Naudin
- Ayenia aprica Cristóbal
- Ayenia ardua Cristóbal – Wingstem ayenia
- Ayenia arenesii Christenh. & Byng
- Ayenia aristeguietae (Cristóbal) Christenh. & Byng
- Ayenia asplundii (Cristóbal) Christenh. & Byng – Ecuador and Peru
- Ayenia asterotricha (Mildbr.) Christenh. & Byng
- Ayenia atrata (Bullock) Christenh. & Byng
- Ayenia attenuatifolia (Cristóbal) Christenh. & Byng
- Ayenia aurantiaca (Mildbr.) Christenh. & Byng
- Ayenia australis (A.St.-Hil.) Christenh. & Byng
- Ayenia bahiensis (Cristóbal) Christenh. & Byng
- Ayenia baronii (Arènes) Christenh. & Byng
- Ayenia beccarii (Warb.) ined.
- Ayenia benensis (Britton) Christenh. & Byng
- Ayenia berlandieri S.Watson
- Ayenia bernieri (Hochr.) Christenh. & Byng
- Ayenia besalampensis (Arènes) Christenh. & Byng
- Ayenia beyrichiana (K.Schum.) Christenh. & Byng
- Ayenia biloba (Baill.) Christenh. & Byng
- Ayenia blanchetiana K.Schum.
- Ayenia boliviana Rusby
- Ayenia byttnerioides Christenh. & Byng
- Ayenia cajalbanensis Alain
- Ayenia campicola (Taub.) ined.
- Ayenia capillata (Cristóbal) ined.
- Ayenia caripensis (Cristóbal) Christenh. & Byng
- Ayenia catalpifolia (Jacq.) Christenh. & Byng
- Ayenia celebica (Hochr.) ined.
- Ayenia celtoides (A.St.-Hil.) Christenh. & Byng
- Ayenia compacta Rose – California ayenia
- Ayenia conciliata Cristóbal
- Ayenia corchorifolia (Turcz.) Dorr
- Ayenia cordata (Lam.) Christenh. & Byng
- Ayenia cordobensis (Hieron.) Hieron.
- Ayenia coriacea (Britton) Christenh. & Byng
- Ayenia corylifolia (Humb. & Bonpl. ex Schult.) Christenh. & Byng
- Ayenia crenulata (Wall. ex Mast.) Christenh. & Byng
- Ayenia cristobaliana (Dorr) Christenh. & Byng
- Ayenia crotonoides Christenh. & Byng
- Ayenia cuatrecasasii Cristóbal
- Ayenia cubensis A.Rodr.
- Ayenia curtisii (Oliv.) ined.
- Ayenia dahomensis (N.Hallé) Christenh. & Byng
- Ayenia decaryana (Arènes) Christenh. & Byng
- Ayenia dentata Brandegee
- Ayenia divaricata (Benth.) Christenh. & Byng
- Ayenia donatica Cristóbal
- Ayenia ekmanii (Urb.) ined.
- Ayenia elegans (Ridl.) ined.
- Ayenia eliae Cristóbal
- Ayenia elliptica (Pohl) Christenh. & Byng
- Ayenia ellipticifolia (Arènes) Christenh. & Byng
- Ayenia erecta Mart. ex K.Schum.
- Ayenia erosa (Gagnep.) ined.
- Ayenia euphrasiifolia Griseb. – Eyebright ayenia
- Ayenia fasiculata Millsp. ex Standl.
- Ayenia fernandesii (Cristóbal) Christenh. & Byng
- Ayenia filiformis S.Watson – Trans-Pecos ayenia
- Ayenia filipes (Mart. ex K.Schum.) Christenh. & Byng
- Ayenia flaccida (Span.) ined.
- Ayenia flexuosa (Killip) Christenh. & Byng – Ecuador
- Ayenia fluvialis (Fryxell & Guadarr.) Christenh. & Byng
- Ayenia fontis (Cristóbal) ined.
- Ayenia fruticosa Rose
- Ayenia fulva (Poepp.) Christenh. & Byng
- Ayenia gayana (A.St.-Hil.) Christenh. & Byng
- Ayenia geminifolia (Turcz.) Dorr
- Ayenia genistella (Triana & Planch.) Christenh. & Byng
- Ayenia glabra S.Watson – Smooth ayenia
- Ayenia glabrescens K.Schum.
- Ayenia glazioui (Hochr.) Christenh. & Byng
- Ayenia gracilipes (Decne. ex Baill.) Christenh. & Byng
- Ayenia grandifolia (DC.) Christenh. & Byng
- Ayenia grisea Machuca-Machuca
- Ayenia guineensis (Keay & Milne-Redh.) Christenh. & Byng
- Ayenia hatschbachii (Cristóbal) Christenh. & Byng
- Ayenia herbacea (Roxb.) ined.
- Ayenia heteromorpha (Arènes) Christenh. & Byng
- Ayenia heterophylla (Hook.) Christenh. & Byng
- Ayenia hirsuta (Ruiz & Pav.) Christenh. & Byng
- Ayenia hirta A.St.-Hil. & Naudin
- Ayenia humbertiana (Arènes) Christenh. & Byng
- Ayenia idroboi (Cristóbal) ined.
- Ayenia implicabilis (Cristóbal) Christenh. & Byng
- Ayenia incallida Cristóbal
- Ayenia insulicola Cristóbal – Dwarf ayenia
- Ayenia integrifolia (Lace) Christenh. & Byng
- Ayenia irwinii (Cristóbal) Christenh. & Byng
- Ayenia ivorensis (N.Hallé) Christenh. & Byng
- Ayenia jackiana (Wall.) ined.
- Ayenia jaculifolia (Pohl) Christenh. & Byng
- Ayenia jaliscana S.Watson
- Ayenia jaramilloana (Dorr) Christenh. & Byng
- Ayenia jussieui Cristóbal
- Ayenia juzepczukii Ulbr.
- Ayenia klugii Cristóbal & Arbo
- Ayenia krapovickasii Cristóbal
- Ayenia laevigata Sw.
- Ayenia lancifolia (A.St.-Hil. & Naudin) Christenh. & Byng
- Ayenia lasiophylla (Cristóbal) Christenh. & Byng
- Ayenia latifolia Cristóbal
- Ayenia latipetala (Arènes) Christenh. & Byng
- Ayenia limitaris Cristóbal – Rio Grande ayenia, Texas ayenia
- Ayenia lingulata Griseb.
- Ayenia lobata (Baill.) Christenh. & Byng
- Ayenia lopez-mirandae (Cristóbal) Christenh. & Byng
- Ayenia loxensis (Cristóbal) Christenh. & Byng
- Ayenia lucida (Arènes) Christenh. & Byng
- Ayenia luyensis Cristóbal
- Ayenia macrantha (Arènes) Christenh. & Byng
- Ayenia macrophylla (Kunth) ined.
- Ayenia magna L.
- Ayenia maingayi (Mast.) ined.
- Ayenia mansfeldiana (Herter) Cristóbal
- Ayenia mastatalensis Cristóbal & N.Zamora
- Ayenia mastersii (Cristóbal) ined.
- Ayenia melantha (Mart. ex K.Schum.) Christenh. & Byng
- Ayenia melastomifolia (A.St.-Hil.) Christenh. & Byng
- Ayenia melleri (Baker) Christenh. & Byng
- Ayenia micrantha Standl.
- Ayenia microphylla A.Gray – Dense ayenia, shrubby ayenia
- Ayenia minytricha (Cristóbal) Christenh. & Byng
- Ayenia mirandae Cristóbal
- Ayenia morifolia (Triana & Planch.) ined.
- Ayenia morii (L.C.Barnett & Dorr) Christenh. & Byng
- Ayenia nervosa Cristóbal
- Ayenia nitidula (Baker) Christenh. & Byng
- Ayenia noblickii Cristóbal
- Ayenia nossibeensis (Arènes) Christenh. & Byng
- Ayenia nummularia Cristóbal
- Ayenia obcordata (Arènes) Christenh. & Byng
- Ayenia obliqua (Benth.) Christenh. & Byng
- Ayenia oblongata (Pohl) Christenh. & Byng
- Ayenia oblongifolia (Arènes) Christenh. & Byng
- Ayenia obtusata (Benth.) Christenh. & Byng
- Ayenia odonellii Cristóbal
- Ayenia oligantha (Arènes) Christenh. & Byng
- Ayenia oranensis (Cristóbal) Christenh. & Byng
- Ayenia ostenii (Cristóbal) Christenh. & Byng
- Ayenia ovata Hemsl.
- Ayenia ovatifolia (Arènes) Christenh. & Byng
- Ayenia palmeri A.Gray
- Ayenia palustris (Cristóbal) Christenh. & Byng
- Ayenia paniculata Rose
- Ayenia parviflora Sessé & Moc.
- Ayenia pedersenii (Cristóbal) Christenh. & Byng
- Ayenia peninsularis Brandegee
- Ayenia peregrina Cristóbal
- Ayenia perrieri (Hochr.) Christenh. & Byng
- Ayenia pescapraeifolia (Britton) Christenh. & Byng
- Ayenia petiolata (Cristóbal) Christenh. & Byng
- Ayenia pilosa Cristóbal – Hairy ayenia
- Ayenia piresii (Cristóbal) Christenh. & Byng
- Ayenia praecipua Cristóbal
- Ayenia praeclara Sandwith
- Ayenia purpusii Brandegee
- Ayenia pusilla L.
- Ayenia ramosissima (Pohl) Christenh. & Byng
- Ayenia reinwardtii (Korth.) ined.
- Ayenia rhamnifolia (Benth.) Christenh. & Byng
- Ayenia rojasii (Cristóbal) Christenh. & Byng
- Ayenia rotundifolia Hemsl.
- Ayenia rubriflora (Arènes) Christenh. & Byng
- Ayenia sagasteguii (Cristóbal) Christenh. & Byng
- Ayenia sagittifolia (A.St.-Hil.) Christenh. & Byng
- Ayenia saligna Dorr
- Ayenia sambiranensis (Arènes) Christenh. & Byng
- Ayenia scabra (L.) Christenh. & Byng
- Ayenia scabrida (Ridl.) ined.
- Ayenia scalpellata (Pohl) Christenh. & Byng
- Ayenia schumanniana Kuntze
- Ayenia schumannii (Cristóbal) Christenh. & Byng
- Ayenia schunkei (Cristóbal) Christenh. & Byng
- Ayenia scorpiura (C.Wright ex Griseb.) ined.
- Ayenia sidifolia (Turcz.) Hemsl.
- Ayenia simulatrix Cristóbal
- Ayenia sparrei (Cristóbal) Christenh. & Byng
- Ayenia spinosa A.Rodr. & Bisse
- Ayenia spinulosa R.E.Fr.
- Ayenia standleyi Cristóbal
- Ayenia stenophylla (Cristóbal) Christenh. & Byng
- Ayenia stipularis Triana & Planch.
- Ayenia subsessilis (Cristóbal) Christenh. & Byng
- Ayenia subtilis Cristóbal
- Ayenia tenuicaulis Urb.
- Ayenia tomentosa L.
- Ayenia tortilis (Gagnep.) ined.
- Ayenia triadenia (Cristóbal) Christenh. & Byng
- Ayenia truncata Rose
- Ayenia tucumanensis (Cristóbal) Christenh. & Byng
- Ayenia uaupensis (Spruce ex K.Schum.) Christenh. & Byng
- Ayenia urosepala (Mildbr.) Christenh. & Byng
- Ayenia urticifolia (K.Schum.) Christenh. & Byng
- Ayenia vargasii (Cristóbal) Christenh. & Byng
- Ayenia velutina Urb.
- Ayenia violacea Urb.
- Ayenia virgata Urb. & Ekman
- Ayenia vitifolia (Baill.) Christenh. & Byng
- Ayenia voulily (Baill.) Christenh. & Byng
- Ayenia weberbaueri (Mildbr.) Christenh. & Byng
- Ayenia wrightii B.L.Rob.
- Ayenia wygodzinskyi Cristóbal
- Ayenia xochipilliae Cristóbal

In addition, the following fossil species have been described:

- Ayenia zhangpuensis

== Ecology ==
Species of Ayenia grow in diverse habitats, from open areas in dry and seasonally-dry regions to humid forests, river banks, and from lowlands to high elevations.

Byttneria species are host plants to insects such as beetles of the genus Lonchophorellus.
