= Ayenia jaramilloana =

Conservation status
- Vulnerable (IUCN 3.1)

Scientific classification
- Kingdom: Plantae
- Clade: Tracheophytes
- Clade: Angiosperms
- Clade: Eudicots
- Clade: Rosids
- Order: Malvales
- Family: Malvaceae
- Genus: Ayenia
- Species: A. jaramilloana

Binomial name
- Ayenia jaramilloana (Dorr) Christenh. & Byng

Synonyms
- Byttneria jaramilloana Dorr

Species of flowering plant

Ayenia jaramilloana is a species of flowering plant in the family Malvaceae. It is found only in Ecuador. Its natural habitats are subtropical or tropical moist montane forests, subtropical or tropical dry shrubland, and subtropical or tropical high-elevation shrubland.
