= Ochropleura costalis =

Scientific classification
- Domain: Eukaryota
- Kingdom: Animalia
- Phylum: Arthropoda
- Class: Insecta
- Order: Lepidoptera
- Superfamily: Noctuoidea
- Family: Noctuidae
- Genus: Ochropleura
- Species: O. costalis

Binomial name
- Ochropleura costalis Moore, 1867

Species of moth

Ochropleura costalis is a moth of the family Noctuidae. It is found in the north-eastern parts of the Himalaya and on Borneo.

The larvae feed on Caryophyllaceae, Chenopodiaceae, Plantaginaceae, Asteraceae, Polygonaceae and Rubiaceae species.
