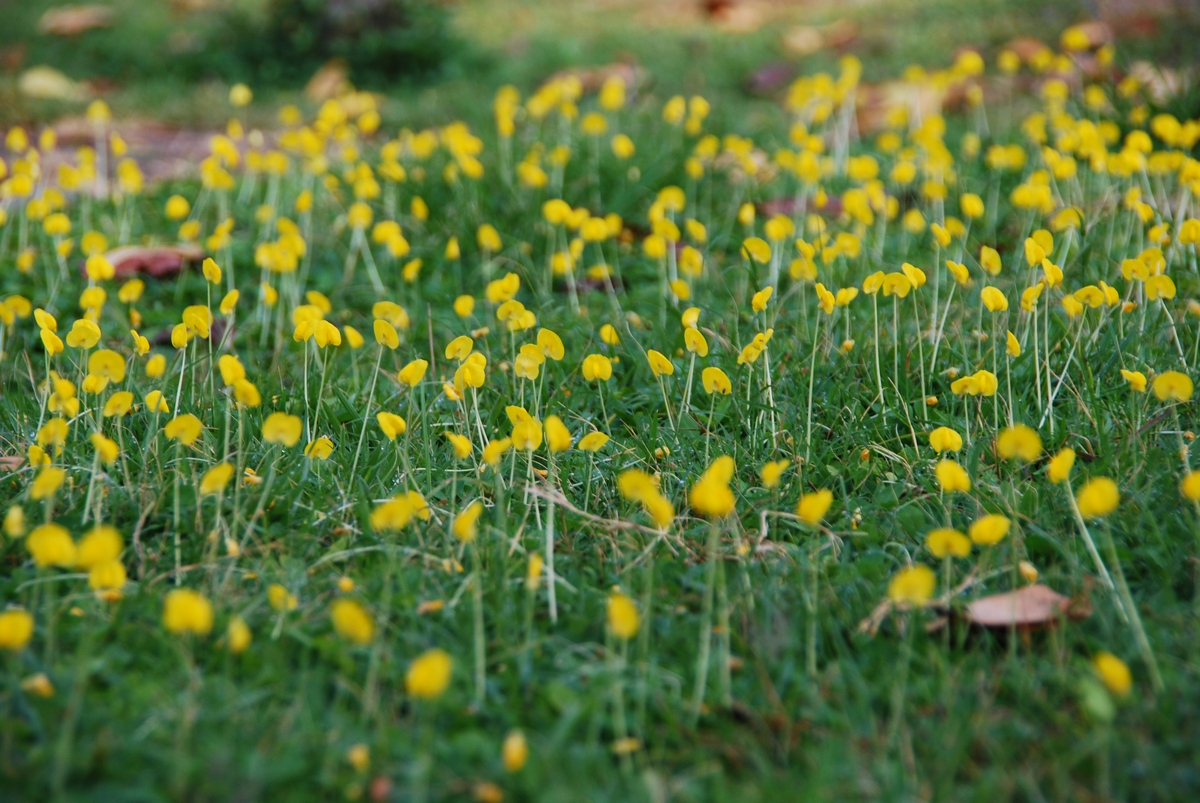

Scientific classification
- Kingdom: Plantae
- Clade: Tracheophytes
- Clade: Angiosperms
- Clade: Eudicots
- Clade: Rosids
- Order: Fabales
- Family: Fabaceae
- Subfamily: Faboideae
- Genus: Arachis
- Species: A. duranensis

Binomial name
- Arachis duranensis Krapov. & W.C.Gregory

= Arachis duranensis =

Species of legume

Arachis duranensis (syn. Arachis argentinensis Speg., Arachis spegazzinii M.Gregory & W.Gregory) is a herb found in South America, specially in North Argentina, Bolivia, and Paraguay. This plant is cited as gene sources for research in plant biology of peanut (Arachis hypogaea).

== Gallery ==
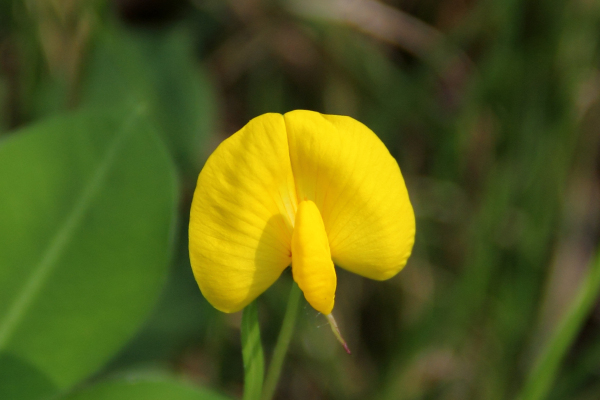

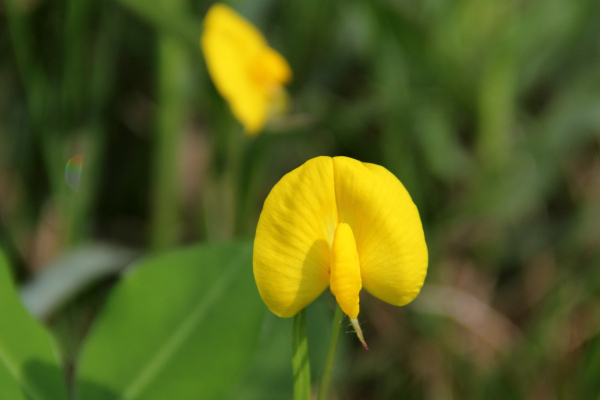

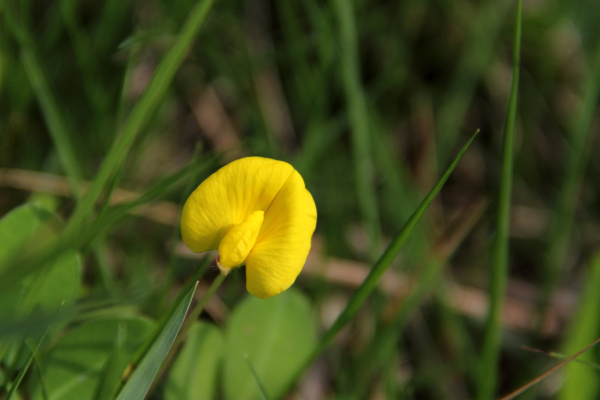
