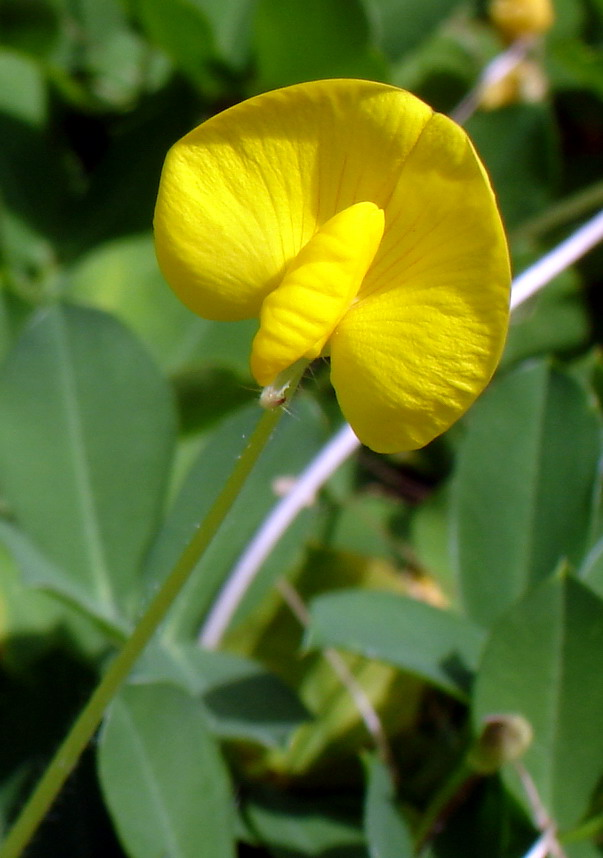

Scientific classification
- Kingdom: Plantae
- Clade: Embryophytes
- Clade: Tracheophytes
- Clade: Angiosperms
- Clade: Eudicots
- Clade: Rosids
- Order: Fabales
- Family: Fabaceae
- Subfamily: Faboideae
- Genus: Arachis
- Species: A. glabrata

Binomial name
- Arachis glabrata Benth.

= Arachis glabrata =

Species of legume

Arachis glabrata (creeping forage peanut, rhizoma peanut, rhizoma perennial peanut, perennial forage peanut, golden glory, ornamental peanut grass) is a high-quality forage plant native to Argentina, Brazil, and Paraguay vegetation. This plant is also used for soil conservation and as an ornamental plant. It is adapted to sandy soils in the Gulf Coast region of the United States.

It is often cultivated together as a following grass species: Axonopus affinis, Axonopus fissifolius, Brachiaria decumbens, Cynodon dactylon, Digitaria eriantha, Paspalum nicorae, and Paspalum notatum. These legume species are also cited as a companion species: Aeschynomene villosa, Medicago sativa, and Trifolium repens.

It is a warm-season, perennial legume.
