= Oswaldo Handro =

Brazilian botanist

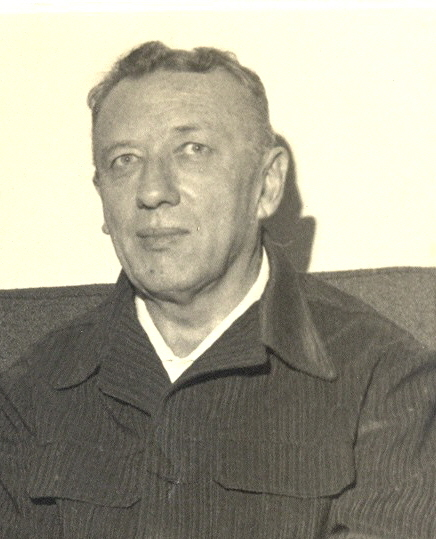
Oswaldo Handro.

Oswaldo Handro (1908–1986) was a Brazilian botanist who specialized in pteridophytes and spermatophytes. The genus Handroanthus was named for him.
