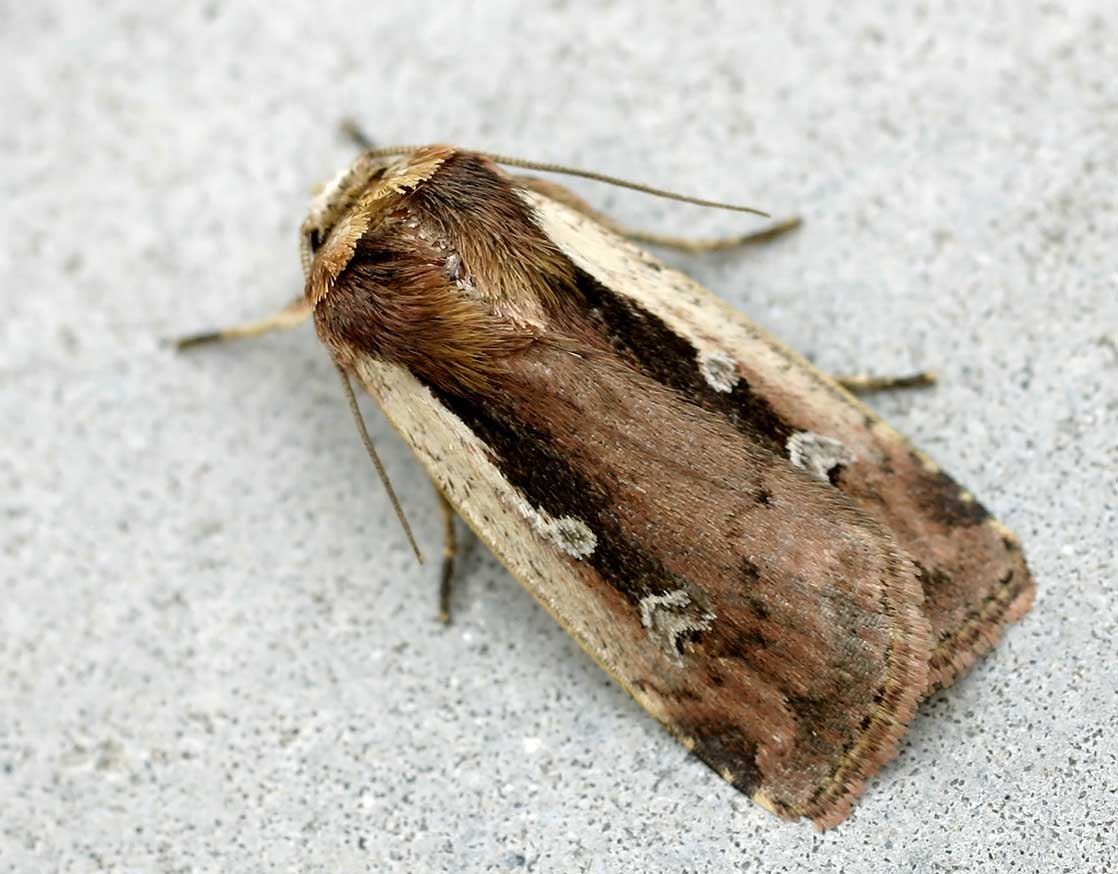

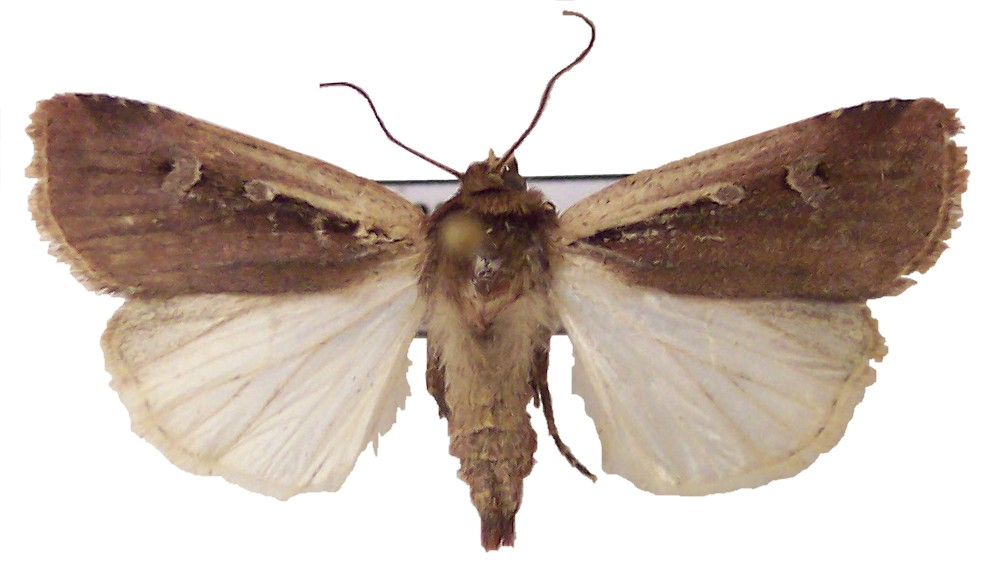

Scientific classification
- Kingdom: Animalia
- Phylum: Arthropoda
- Class: Insecta
- Order: Lepidoptera
- Superfamily: Noctuoidea
- Family: Noctuidae
- Genus: Ochropleura
- Species: O. plecta

Binomial name
- Ochropleura plecta (Linnaeus, 1761)

Synonyms
- Phalaena plecta; Ochropleura vicaria; Ochropleura plectella

= Flame shoulder =

Species of moth

The flame shoulder (Ochropleura plecta) is a moth of the family Noctuidae. The species was first described by Carl Linnaeus in 1761. It is distributed throughout the Palearctic from Ireland in the west to Siberia then Korea and Japan in the east.

The forewings of this species are reddish brown with a black streak interrupted by white stigmata and a creamy-yellow streak along the costa which gives the species its common name. The hindwings are pure white.

== Technical description and variation ==
The wingspan is 28–34 mm. Forewing red brown suffused with purple; costal streak broadly cream colour to outer line, sometimes red speckled; cell and a basal streak below median vein blackish or deep red; orbicular and reniform stigmata with bright pale rings and grey centres, the latter followed by a small black blotch; lines rarely visible; hindwing whitish; patagia red-brown; dorsum greyish fuscous, sometimes with basal half cream coloured, sometimes wholly cream coloured. The ab. unimacula Stgr. [now ssp.] from Spain has the orbicular stigma obsolete; — in ab. anderssoni Lampa from Scandinavia the forewing is blackish purple; in ab. glaucimacula Graes. from Amurland the stigmata are smaller, as in leucogaster Frr. [now full species] and pearl grey in colour; the outer line of forewing well marked and indicated on hindwing also by vein-dots; patagia black brown; — ab. ignota uncertainly ranked by Swinh., described in the first instance from Sri Lanka, has the cell red like the rest of wing; European examples of this form are generally entirety pale red, with the costal streak red-speckled and usually females.

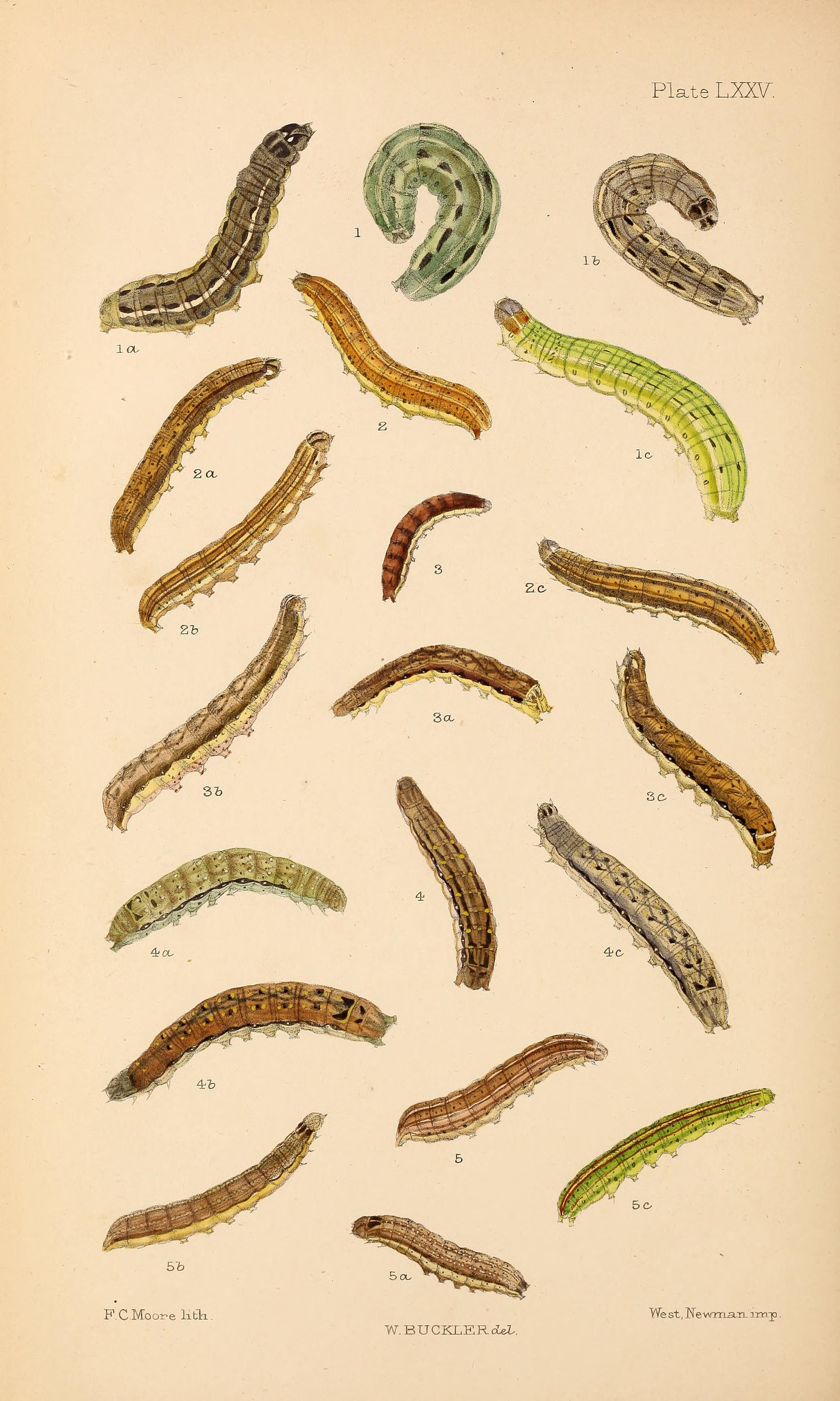
5,5a,5b,5c larva after last moult

== Biology ==
Two broods are produced each year with adults flying from April to June and again in August and September. It flies at night and is attracted to light and sugar and also to the flowers of ragwort.

The caterpillar is brownish. Ventral area yellowish. There are fine dark line found on dorsal area. Stigmata black in color.

The larva, grey with a yellow stripe along each side, feeds on a range of plants (see list below). This species overwinters as a pupa.

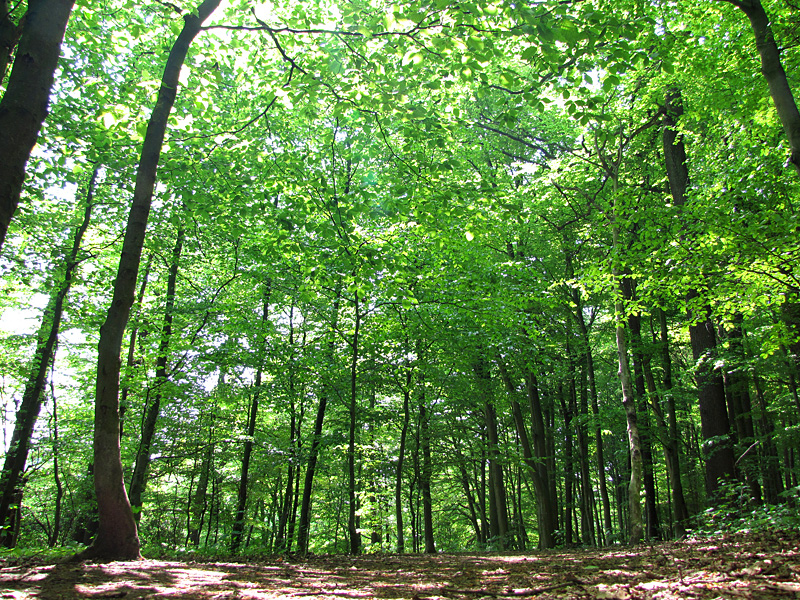
Habitat, Germany

== Recorded food plants ==
- Arachis – peanut
- Aster
- Beta – beet
- Galium – bedstraw
- Plantago – plantain
- Rumex – docks and sorrel
- Salix – willow
- Senecio – groundsel
- Trifolium – clover

See Robinson, G. S et al.

== Subspecies ==
- O. p. plecta – Europe except Iberian Peninsula
- O. p. unimacula – Iberian Peninsula
