= Carmen Lelia Cristóbal =

Argentine botanist (1932–2019)

Carmen Lelia Cristóbal (1 December 1932 – 25 September 2019) was an Argentine botanist and professor at the National University of the Northeast (UNNE) in Corrientes. She specialized in the plant family Sterculiaceae.

== Early life and education ==
Born in Tafí Viejo, Tucumán Province, Cristóbal received a Ph.D. in botany from the National University of Tucumán in 1959. Her thesis on the genus Ayenia received the Ernesto Padilla Prize in 1960 from the Miguel Lillo Foundation, and the Cristóbal Hicken Prize in 1961 from the National Academy of Sciences of Argentina.

== Career ==
Cristóbal began teaching at the University of Tucumán in 1955, while still a student. She became a CONICET researcher in 1962. In 1964, she moved to Corrientes to teach general botany in UNNE's Faculty of Agricultural Sciences. She also taught Botany I in its Faculty of Exact Sciences.

Cristóbal and her husband, Antonio Krapovickas, helped establish the Instituto de Botánica del Nordeste. She wrote more than 40 works, including four taxonomic revisions, and was particularly noted for her research on the genus Byttneria.

== Personal life ==
Cristóbal was married to botanist Antonio Krapovickas. She died in Corrientes on 25 September 2019, aged 86.
