= Antonio Krapovickas =

Argentine botanist (1921–2015)

Antonio Krapovickas (8 October 1921 – 17 August 2015) was an Argentine agronomist.

Krapovickas received a degree in 1948 in agronomic engineering from the University of Buenos Aires and began teaching in 1949 as Professor of Genetics and Systems Botany at the University of Córdoba. He later became Professor of Plant Anatomy at the National University of Tucumán.

In 1964, he moved to Corrientes to accept a position at the National University of the Northeast (UNNE), becoming chair of its Department of Botany and Ecology in 1977. He also founded the university's botanical gardens, Spanish: Instituto de Botánica del Nordeste or Ibone, with his wife, Dr. Carmen L. Cristóbal.

Krapovickas' research centered on taxonomy of the family Malvaceae and biology of species in the genus Arachis (Fabaceae). His publications in these fields, including over 110 papers, 8 book chapters, and a monograph on Arachis - the genus of the groundnut - that he coauthored with Walton C. Gregory, are very influential and widely cited.

== Awards and distinctions ==
- John Simon Guggenheim Fellow (1953)
- CONICET Research Scientist (1961–1994)
- Director of Ibone (1977–1991)
- President of the Sociedad Argentina de Genética (1983–1985)
- Konex Award in Science and Technology recipient (1983)
- Centro Argentino de Ingenieros Agrónomos (CADIA) Prize recipient (1984)
- Corresponding member of the Botanical Society of America (1989)
- Bunge y Born Award in Agronomy recipient (1990)
- Professor emeritus at UNNE (1990)

== Publications ==
This list is incomplete.

- Krapovickas, A.; Walton C. Gregory (1994). "Taxonomia del genero Arachis (Leguminosae)". Bonplandia. 8: 1–186.
