= Beth Bechdol =

American agricultural economist

Deputy Director-General of the Food and Agriculture Organization of the United Nations
- Incumbent
- Assumed office 2020
- Leader: Qu Dongyu

Deputy Director of the Indiana State Department of Agriculture
- In office 2005–2014

Chief of Staff to the Under Secretary for Farm and Foreign Agricultural Services
- In office 2002–2005

Personal details
- Born: Indiana, USA
- Education: Georgetown University; Purdue University
- Occupation: Agricultural economist
- Profession: Public servant

Elizabeth A. Bechdol is an American agricultural economist. She has served as Deputy Director-General of the Food and Agricultural Organization (FAO) since 2020.

== Early life and education ==
Bechdol is the daughter of Phil and Maxine Brechbill. She was raised on a farm in Indiana and attended Dekalb High School. Bechdol earned a Bachelor of Science from Georgetown University in international law and international affairs. She then completed a Master of Science at Purdue University, in agricultural economics.

== Career ==
Bechdol began her professional career at Sparks, an agricultural consulting and market analysis firm in McLean, Virginia (later Informa Economics). She rose to become vice president of the company.

In 2001, Bechdol went to work as deputy staff economist for the United States Senate Committee on Agriculture, Nutrition, and Forestry. From 2002 to 2005, she served as chief of staff to the Under Secretary for Farm and Foreign Agricultural Services at the United States Department of Agriculture (USDA). In 2005, Bechdol returned to Indiana as assistant director of the Indiana State Department of Agriculture. In 2007, she joined the Indianapolis law firm Ice Miller as their director of agribusiness strategies, a position she held for 11 years.

From 2014 to 2020, Bechdol worked as president and CEO of AgriNovus Indiana, a state's agbioscience initiative. Bechdol has also served on a number of board including chair of the National FFA Foundation Board of Trustees, the Purdue Research Foundation the Farm Foundation Round Table.

In 2020, Bechdol was appointed Deputy Director-General of FAO, responsible for emergency response, the Plant Production and Protection Division, the Land and Water Division and the FAO's North America Liaison Office.

In 2026, American industry groups lobbied the US president to support a bid for Bechdol to become the Director-General of the FAO.

== Awards and honors ==
- IFAMA International Women in Agriculture Award (2025)
- Distinguished Hoosier Award (2008)
- Indiana Commission for Women's Torchbearer Award for Agriculture (2008)
- Purdue University's Outstanding Master's Thesis Award.
