= Catherine Geslain-Lanéelle =

French agricultural engineer (born 1963)

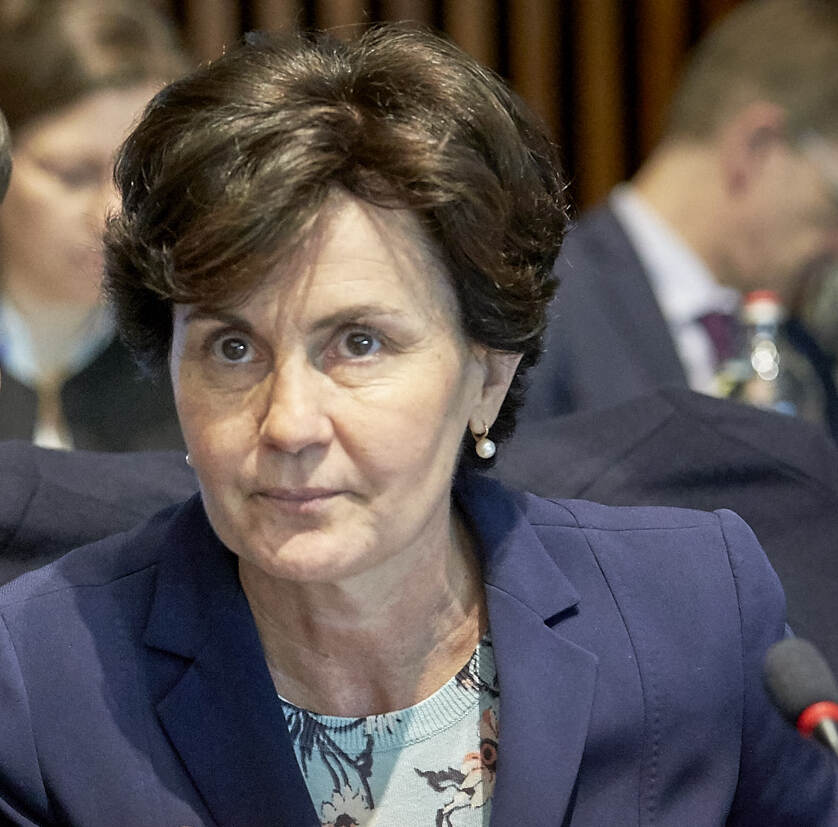
Catherine Geslain-Lanéelle in 2017

Catherine Geslain-Lanéelle (born in 1963) is a French agricultural engineer. Ministerial Delegate to the Minister of Agriculture and Food since July 2018. Between 2013 and 2018 she was Under Secretary of State for the French Ministry of Agriculture and Food.

For the first time in EU history, she is the sole candidate designated as the EU candidate for the Food and Agriculture Organization of the United Nations by the Council of the European Union in October 2018.

== Education and responsibilities ==
1986 : Engineer in agronomy, AgroParisTech (Paris)

1987 : Civil, water and forest engineer (ENGREF, Paris)

2001 / 2002 : Chair of the Codex Committee on General Principles (WHO-FAO)

2002 / 2006 : Vice-chair of the management board of European Food Safety Authority

President of a NGO providing social assistance to homeless people (Bail pour tous)

Since 2017 Member of the Board of the École nationale vétérinaire de Toulouse (France)

== Timeline ==
– January 1991 / to December 1993 : National Expert at the European Commission - Internal Market and Industry.

– January 1994 / to May 1997 : Head of Office for Milk and Dairy Products, Ministry of Agriculture and Fisheries.

– June 1997 / to November 1998 : Adviser on animal production and the environment in the Private Office of the Minister of Agriculture and Fisheries.

– November 1998 / to July 2000 : Head of the International Exchanges Department of the Minister of Agriculture and Fisheries.

– August 2000 / to February 2003 : Director General of Food, appointed by the President of the French Republic

– April 2003 / to June 2006 : Regional Director of Agriculture, Forestry and Food, at Ile-de-France Region

– July 2006 / to August 2013 : Executive Director of the European Food Safety Authority (EFSA)

– September 2013 / June 2018 : Director-General, appointed by the President of the French Republic, Directorate- General for the Economic and Environmental Performance of enterprises, Ministry of Agriculture and Food

– France and the European Union's candidate to the position of FAO Director-General

– Currently Ministerial Delegate to the Minister of Agriculture and Food;

== Controversies ==
In her bid to become the next Director General of the Food and Agriculture Organization, Catherine Geslain-Lanéelle told U.S. officials that she would not defend the EU position on genetically modified organisms or GMOs and instead will support U.S. interests. This has caused a debate in the French media who accused her of betraying EU interests, albeit being the EU candidate, only to gain the support of the United States
