= Qu Dongyu =

Director-General of a United Nations agency

- 屈冬玉
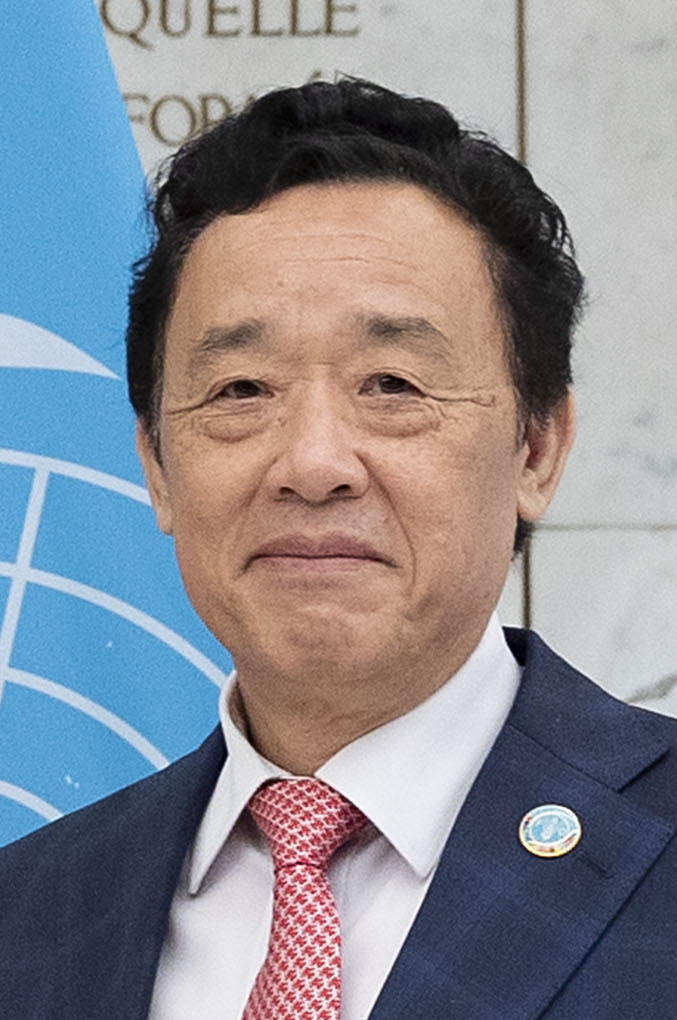
- Dongyu in 2023

Director-General of the Food and Agriculture Organization (FAO)
- Incumbent
- Assumed office 1 August 2019
- Secretary-General: António Guterres
- Preceded by: José Graziano da Silva

Vice Minister for Agriculture and Rural Affairs
- In office 2015–2019
- Minister: Han Changfu

Vice-Chair of the Ningxia Hui Autonomous Region
- In office 2011–2015
- Chairperson: Wang Zhengwei; Liu Hui

Personal details
- Born: October 29, 1963 (age 62) Yongzhou, Hunan, China
- Party: Chinese Communist Party
- Education: Hunan Agricultural University; Chinese Academy of Agricultural Sciences; University of Wageningen
- Profession: Biologist

Chinese name
- Chinese: 屈冬玉
Transcriptions
Standard Mandarin
- Hanyu Pinyin: Qū Dōngyù
- Wade–Giles: Chʻü Tung-yü
- IPA: [tɕʰý tʊ́ŋŷ]
Xiang
- IPA: Tʼy^{1} Dong^{1}y^{4}

Qu Dongyu (Chinese: 屈冬玉; pinyin: Qū Dōngyù; born October 29, 1963) is a Chinese diplomat who took up office as the ninth Director-General of the Food and Agriculture Organization (FAO) of the United Nations on 1 August 2019. He is the first Chinese national to head the Organization. Qu won the nomination on the first round of voting at the 41st FAO Conference on 23 June 2019, obtaining 108 of the 191 votes cast by the 194 member countries.

== Early life and education ==
Qu was born in Yongzhou, Hunan, China in October 1963. He trained to become a biologist, gaining a bachelor's degree from Hunan Agricultural University, a Master's degree in plant breeding and genetics from the Chinese Academy of Agricultural Sciences, and a Doctorate in Agricultural and Environmental Sciences from the University of Wageningen, Netherlands in 1986. He joined the Chinese Communist Party the same year.

== Career ==
From 2001 to 2011 he was vice president of the Chinese Academy of Agricultural Sciences. Qu Dongyu contributed to the sequencing of the potato genome through his role (Principal Investigator) in the Potato Genome Sequencing Consortium, at the Chinese Institute of Vegetables & Flowers, Chinese Academy of Agricultural Sciences. The research took six years and found that the potato contains about 39,000 genes.

Qu Dongyu received the World Potato Congress Industry Award, as part of a team in 2006.

Between 2011 and 2015 he served as vice-chair of the Ningxia Hui Autonomous Region in China and in 2015 he became vice-minister of the Ministry of Agriculture and Rural Affairs, where he was involved in promoting international collaboration with organizations such as FAO and Centre for Agriculture and Bioscience International.

In 2013, Qu Dongyu co-authored research into genetic resistance of potatoes to late blight.

=== Food and Agriculture Organization ===
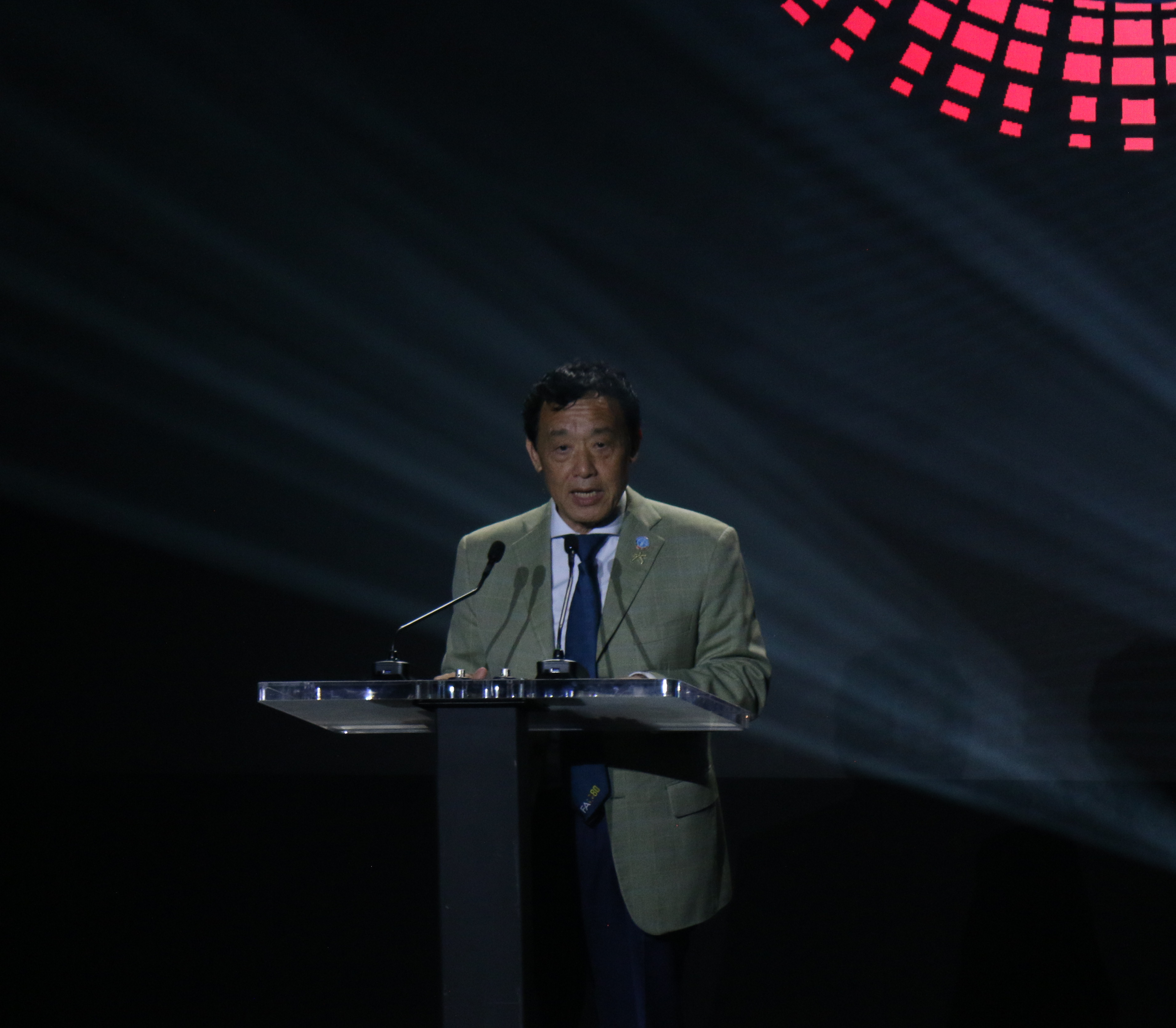
Qu at the 2025 AI for Good Summit in Geneva

Qu was supported by China in the 2018 election for Director-General of the FAO. The United States Department of State was concerned about Qu's potential victory, and Assistant Secretary of State for International Organization Affairs Kevin Moley moved to support Georgian politician David Kirvalidze, though many other American officials, including those at the U.S. Department of Agriculture and U.S. Embassy in Rome preferred Catherine Geslain-Lanéelle, the French agricultural engineer backed by the European Union.

Qu won the election in June 2019 with 108 votes over Geslain-Lanéelle's 71 and Kirvalidze's 12. Allegations of bribery and coercion by China to secure the votes of other FAO delegates featured prominently in the election. After Qu's election, Chinese nationals were appointed to central departments and approvals for pesticides containing ingredients banned in the EU were granted for use in Asia and Africa.

Following the Russian invasion of Ukraine, diplomats have criticized Qu for failing to address the 2022–2023 food crises. According to a former UN official interviewed by Politico Europe, "Nobody actually takes him seriously: It's not him; it's China," and "I'm not convinced he would make a single decision without first checking it with the capital." According to The Economist, "Many governments privately accuse the Chinese head of the UN Food and Agriculture Organisation (sic), Qu Dongyu, of downplaying the impact on food security of Russia's invasion of Ukraine, a huge grain producer. They presume the aim was to spare China's ally, Mr Putin, from criticism."

In 2023, a joint study by German public broadcasters found that Qu "instrumentalized" the FAO "to serve Beijing's interests." Under Qu's tenure, the FAO has supported Belt and Road Initiative projects and inked its first agreement with a pesticide company, Syngenta, which is a subsidiary of state-owned ChemChina.
