= Frank Lidgett McDougall =

Australian farmer and economic adviser

Frank Lidgett McDougall (1884–1958) was a British-born Australian farmer and economic adviser, now best known for his part in the foundation of the Food and Agriculture Organization.

== Early life ==
He was the son of John McDougall, a Wesleyan Methodist, and his second wife Ellen Lidgett (1858–1952). She was a first cousin of Methodist leader John Scott Lidgett, and wrote devotional works. He was born in Greenwich, his father's third son, and was educated at Blackheath Proprietary School. He was then a student at Darmstadt University of Technology.

John Scott Lidgett's father was John Jacob Lidgett (1828–1869), who had a younger brother George Lidgett (1831–1907). McDougall's mother Ellen was the daughter of George Lidgett, meaning that he had relations in South Africa: Sidney Bunting and his uncle Jack Lidgett. Sidney and Jack planned to farm wattle at Lidgetton in Natal, on a family property, a scheme put on foot in 1906–7. After leaving university, McDougall spent two years there on the farm.

McDougall moved in 1909 to Renmark, South Australia where there were his half-brothers, and his sisters Margery and Catherine, and farmed a fruit block. He was able to buy 40 acres (16 ha). He spoke in later life of having started "with an axe, a mattock, and an occasional charge of dynamite, to clear the bush". In 1915 he volunteered for the Australian Imperial Force, serving in the 27th Battalion as a second lieutenant and the I ANZAC Cyclist Battalion.

== The Australian Dried Fruit Association ==
After the war, McDougall became heavily involved in the Australian Dried Fruit Association (ADFA), rising to be chairman of the Australian Dried Fruit Board in the 1930s. The ADFA had been created from local groups in 1907 by W. B. Chaffey. In 1922 Chaffey, McDougall and Charles Edward Devenish Meares travelled to London, to promote Australian dried fruit in the British market. At this point, McDougall was engaged in the workings of Imperial Preference. Later, he considered that trade barriers and overproduction were implicated in "poor global nutrition". From the ADFA's point of view, world prices were dropping, in the early 1920s, just when the production acreage was increasing strongly. Its price-fixing function at home was removed in 1926, for a decade.

== Under Stanley Bruce ==
Stanley Bruce became Australia's Prime Minister in 1923, and recruited McDougall for a role at Australia House in London. After a period in the Prime Minister's Department in 1924, McDougall returned to London in 1925, with part of his time devoted to the Dried Fruits Control Board.

McDougall was there to gather information for Bruce, as a publicist, and also for purposes of networking. He was appointed to the Empire Marketing Board in 1926, holding the position to 1932. On the Board's publicity committee, he worked with William Smith Crawford, Frank Pick, Harry Levy-Lawson, 1st Viscount Burnham and Woodman Burbidge of Harrods.

In 1927 McDougall suggested that Bruce invite John Boyd Orr of the Rowett Institute to Australia, to advise on animal nutrition. Boyd Orr and David Rivett were important contacts, connected with another aspect of his London work, liaison with CSIR.

== League of Nations work ==
In 1929, Stanley Bruce was replaced as Australia's Prime Minister by James Scullin, and McDougall felt his position in London was insecure under the Labor Party administration. In fact he remained at Australia House until 1946. He supported Scullin for the 1930 Imperial Conference, and weathered a salary cut by writing, in particular for Lord Beaverbrook.

From 1928, McDougall had worked with Australian delegations headed for the League of Nations in Geneva. The watershed in McDougall's thinking on trade came as he prepared for the London Economic Conference of 1933, and reassessed "restriction policies to control plenty in a poverty stricken world". From this period he took on the role of éminence grise, working behind the scenes to effect change. In the field of international nutrition, he did so effectively, beginning with a memorandum of January 1935, "The Agriculture and the Health Problems". With Bruce providing introductions, he met social figures and those in power.

With Alexander Loveday, McDougall wrote a significant 1935 speech for Bruce to give to the League of Nations Assembly, calling for the lowering of tariff barriers. The speech also nodded to contemporary nutritional thinking by stating "calories are not enough". Bruce and McDougall then promoted the slogan "marry health and agriculture"; the implication that agricultural policy might have global impact on public health issues was innovative, and has been called "a major landmark in the history of nutrition". Boyd Orr, too, had contributed to the formulation.

Behind the speech was a notable working paper. While the political authority of the League dropped away in the 1930s, it supported technical research on global problems. The Burnet–Aykroyd report of 1935, authored by Étienne Burnet and Wallace Rundell Aykroyd, moved nutrition as a public policy issue into the domain of public health. The Health Organization of the League of Nations was then asked in 1936 to set up a nutrition section. McDougall worked with others on the Nutrition – Final Report of the Mixed Committee of 1937 that resulted.

Continuing in the same direction, McDougall in 1938 chaired a subcommittee of the League's Economic and Financial Organization, on standard of living (which the League characterised as "human well-being"). It was a further "mixed committee", with ILO representation, on which McDougall had an ally in Noel Hall: the topic was cross-cultural and contentious. McDougall, Neal and Boyd Orr were agreed in an approach to alleviating the economic austerity of the times. Bruce produced the "Bruce Report" on standard of living. The outbreak of World War II made all these efforts moot by 1940.

== The Food and Agriculture Organization ==
The Food and Agriculture Organization (FAO) of the United Nations grew out of the 1943 Hot Springs Conference on agriculture at Hot Springs, Virginia, called by Franklin Delano Roosevelt as a "World Food Conference". The idea has been attributed to John Gilbert Winant; also, on the account given by Gove Hambidge, to the intervention of the First Lady, Eleanor Roosevelt. Paul H. Appleby may have been involved. On the agenda of the US and United Kingdom was an international wheat agreement.

In autumn 1942, McDougall had work on the wheat question that took him to Washington DC, sent by Bruce, who in a letter to Stafford Cripps dated 9 September explained that McDougall also bore a paper, "Progress in the War of Ideas". He dined at the White House, meeting the First Lady and Harry Hopkins. They talked about post-war reconstruction, and the role of food and agriculture. The First Lady had a copy of "Progress in the War of Ideas", and the President read it in the presence of Henry A. Wallace, vice-president.

McDougall attended the Hot Springs Conference, at which the basis of the FAO, set up in 1946, was laid out. He then pursued his agenda largely through the FAO, acting as its liaison with the United Nations. He worked with both Boyd Orr, the first FAO Director, and Dag Hammarskjöld of the UN.

== Death ==
McDougall died on 15 February 1958 in Rome, of peritonitis.

== Works ==
- Sheltered Markets (1925), advocacy for imperial tariff preference.
- Britain's Oversea Markets: Dominions Versus Foreign Countries (1927)
- Food and Welfare (1939)
- Food and Population (1952)
- Letters from a "Secret Service Agent", F. L. McDougall to S. M. Bruce. 1924-1929 (1986), edited by W. J. Hudson and Wendy Way.

== Family ==
In 1915 McDougall married Madeline Joyce Cutlack, sister of Frederic Cutlack. He was survived by a son John and daughter Elisabeth.

== McDougall Memorial Lectures ==
The McDougall Memorial Lectures were founded in 1958, "to commemorate the late F. L. McDougall who played a leading role in the foundation of FAO and initiation of its activities." They are biennial, and are delivered at the opening of the FAO conference.

- 1959 Arnold J. Toynbee
- 1961 John D. Rockefeller III
- 1963 Julius Nyerere
- 1971 Norman Borlaug
- 1973 Gunnar Myrdal
- 1977 Andrew Young
- 1981 Indira Gandhi
