= Regional Animal Health Center for North Africa =

FAO-run facility

The Regional Animal Health Center for North Africa (RAHC-NA) is a facility run by the United Nations Food and Agriculture Organization Emergency Centre for Transboundary Animal Diseases (FAO-ECTAD). It has been in action since May 2007. The purpose of RAHC-NA is to provide a framework in order to coordinate and harmonize strategies for monitoring and evaluating activities for the control of animal diseases in the region, including zoonoses and avian Influenza in particular. Thus, the interventions of the RCAH-NA are mainly focused on understanding the fields of animal health, public health, but also food safety. The idea of developing FAO-ECTAD/Regional Animal Health Centers (RAHC) was first launched during the International Conference on Avian and Human Influenza II, held at Beijing, China in January 2006. Under this initiative, FAO started developing RAHCs in all sensitive areas.

The RAHC-NA covers up Maghreb countries: Mauritania, Morocco, Algeria, Tunisia and Libya, though most of its activities are also developed in coordination with Egypt. The RAHC-NA is also seeking to bring both Mediterranean shores into contact and encourage coordination and joint work between the countries of North Africa and Southern Europe through the Mediterranean Network for Animal Health (REMESA) initiative.
