= Hot Springs Conference =

1943 agriculture conference in Virginia, US

The Hot Springs Conference, also referred to as the Food and Agriculture Conference and officially known as the United Nations Conference on Food and Agriculture, with representatives from 10 nations, was held from 18 May to 3 June 1943, in Hot Springs, Virginia, in the United States. Its primary function was the creation of the Food and Agriculture Organization, the first functional organization of what would later become the United Nations.

== History ==
The primary mover of progress towards and at the conference was Frank L. McDougall, economic advisor to the Australian High Commission and previously a long-time activist for agricultural and nutritional issues at the League of Nations. Attached to the Australian legation in Washington, McDougall managed to approach U.S. Vice President Henry A. Wallace and subsequently the President and First Lady, Franklin and Eleanor Roosevelt, about the advantages of his ideas in regards to postwar agricultural issues.

The conference opened on 18 May 1943. All countries that were then members of the United Nations (established through the Declaration by United Nations, 1 January 1942), plus an observer from Denmark, were in attendance. The conference set the outlines for what would become the Food and Agriculture Organization (FAO), which was subsequently inaugurated on 16 October 1945, and took up its headquarters in the office of the International Institute for Agriculture (IIA) in Rome, Italy.

Members of the Axis powers were not invited; Nazi Germany's state newspaper, the Völkischer Beobachter, reported on 21 May 1943, that the Hot Springs Conference was an Allied ploy to place global food supplies under the control of the major Allied states, making the Hot Springs Conference, in Nazi parlance, an attempted "anchoring of the political dictatorship of Wall Street Jews all over the world". The Völkischer Beobachter repeated its attacks (always paired with antisemitic rhetoric) on the Hot Springs Conference over several articles and into June 1943.

The Hot Springs Conference stands in a greater context of Allied and United Nations conferences about the establishment of postwar infrastructure; other such meetings were held at Geneva in 1947 to establish the General Agreement on Tariffs and Trade (GATT) and at Havana in 1948 to establish the Havana Charter. The Hot Springs Conference's focus on postwar humanitarian relief preparations is also reflected in the preparations, starting in 1943, for the establishment of the United Nations Relief and Rehabilitation Administration (UNRRA).

== Literature ==
- Evang, K. (September 1944). "The United Nations Conference on Food and Agriculture, Hot Springs, Virginia, 18th May–3rd June, 1943". Proceedings of the Nutrition Society. 2 (3–4): 163–176. doi:10.1079/PNS19440010.
