= Addeke Hendrik Boerma =

Dutch economist

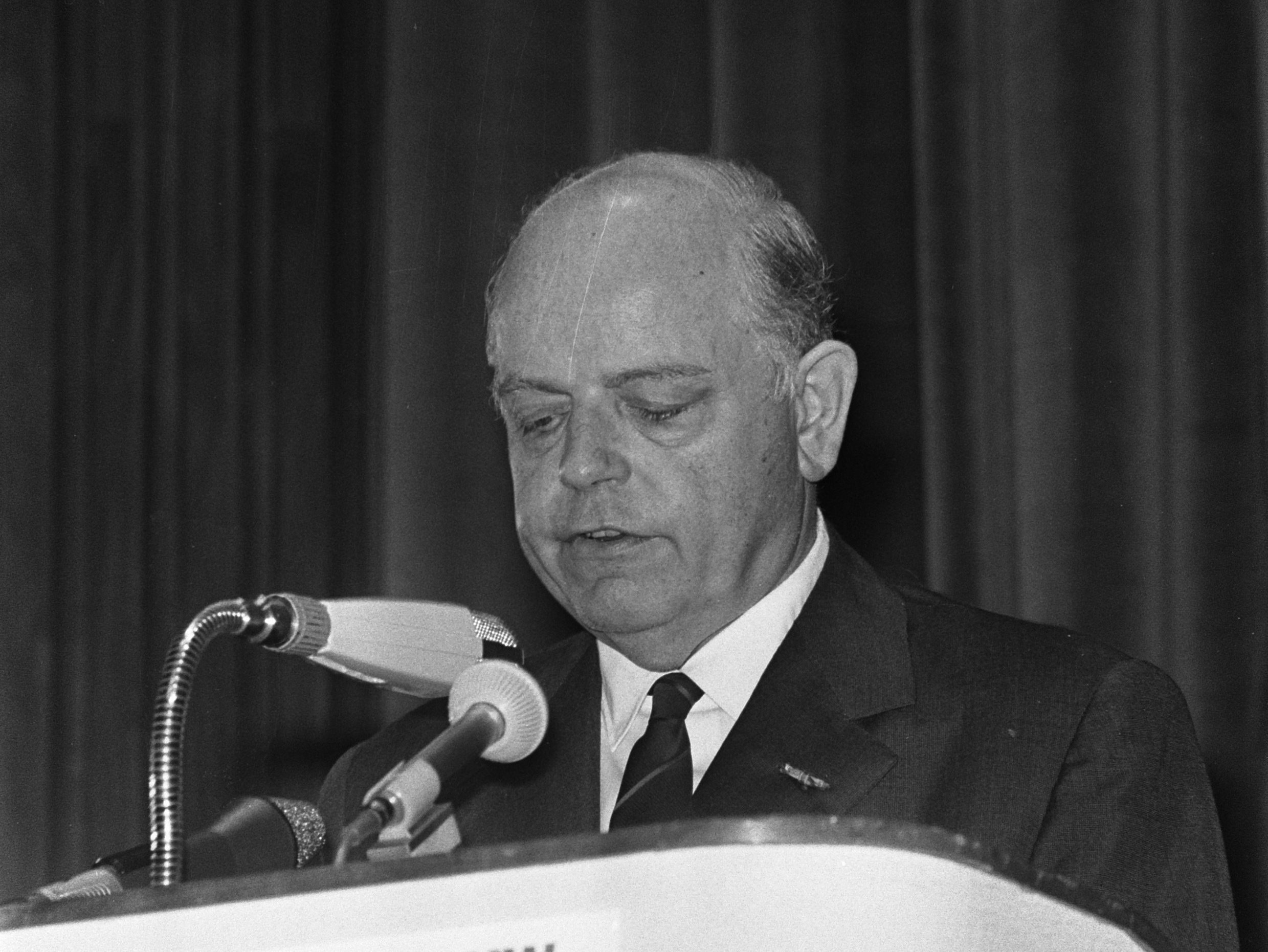
- Boerma in 1970

Director General of the Food and Agriculture Organization
- In office 1967–1975
- Preceded by: Binay Ranjan Sen
- Succeeded by: Edouard Saouma

Executive Director of the World Food Programme
- In office 1962–1967
- Succeeded by: Sushil K. Dev

Personal details
- Born: 3 April 1912 Annerveenschekanaal, Netherlands
- Died: 8 May 1992 (aged 80) Vienna, Austria
- Education: Wageningen University and Research
- Occupation: civil servant

Addeke Hendrik Boerma (3 April 1912 – 8 May 1992) was a Dutch civil servant who served as the first executive director of the World Food Programme from 1962 to 1967 and as the director general of the Food and Agriculture Organization from 1967 until December 1975.

== Early life and education ==
Boerma was born in Annerveenschekanaal on 3 April 1912 in a farming family. He went to school in Veendam. From 1929 to 1934, Boerma studied horticulture and agricultural economics at the Wageningen University and Research.

== Career ==
After university, Boerma became a government commissioner for arable farming and animal husbandry and, in 1938, went to work for the National Agency for Wartime Food Supply on preparations for food supply in the Netherlands in wartime. In October 1944, he went to the already liberated south of the Netherlands to prepare the food supply and the sending of relief supplies.

For his services during and after the war, Boerma was made a Knight in the Order of the Netherlands Lion and a Commander in the Order of Leopold.

=== World Food Program ===
Beginning in 1947, Boerma held various positions at the Food and Agriculture Organization (FAO) of the United Nations. He also became the first executive director of the United Nations World Food Program in 1962. In 1967, he was elected director general of the FAO. He initiated a reorganization of the NGO and focused on poverty issues. He retired from civil service on 1 January 1976.

Boerma spent his final years in Austria before his death in 1992.
