= Manoj Juneja =

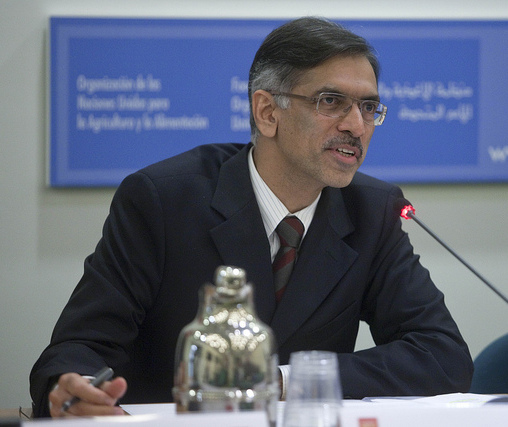
- Born: 1960 (age 65–66); India
- Education: London School of Economics (B.Sc, M.Sc)
- Occupations: Economist; Chartered Accountant

Manoj Juneja (born 1960) is the founder and managing partner of a niche strategy consulting firm. He was until late 2023 the deputy executive director and chief financial officer of the United Nations World Food Programme (WFP), which was awarded the Nobel Peace Prize in 2020. Prior to joining WFP, he served in 2011-12 as deputy director-general for operations at the UN Food and Agriculture Organization (FAO), and in 2003-04 as executive director at the International Labour Organization (ILO).

== Education and academic activities ==
Juneja holds a BSc (1981) and MSc (1985) in economics from the London School of Economics and Political Science (LSE). He is a fellow of the Institute of Chartered Accountants in England and Wales (ICAEW), and has attained several academic distinctions including an Order of Merit of the ICAEW. He has participated in the International Visitor Leadership Program at the invitation of the U.S. Department of State as well as an executive leadership program at Stanford University.

He has taught at the LSE, Boston University and the University of Geneva. He also serves on the advisory board at the University of California, Berkeley's Asia-Pacific Cooperation Study Centre and the board of governors of the United Nations System Staff College.

== Professional career ==
After five years in the private sector as a business consultant and senior auditor at Arthur Andersen's London office, Juneja began his United Nations tenure at FAO in 1987. Between 1997 and 2002 he led FAO's Programme and Budget service. He was appointed to the post of executive director, support services, treasurer and financial controller at the ILO during 2003-04. After returning to FAO, from January 2005 he led the Office of Strategy, Planning and Resource Management, and from January 2008 served as assistant director-general, corporate services, human resources and finance. In April 2011 the FAO Council endorsed his appointment as deputy director-general for operations, and the United Nations secretary-general approved his appointment to the senior leadership of WFP from January 2013. After resigning from WFP in 2023, he founded a consulting firm based in the U.A.E. which provides advisory and management services to multilateral organizations and the private sector.

== Personal life ==
An Indian national, he is married with two children.
