= Annerveenschekanaal =

- Village
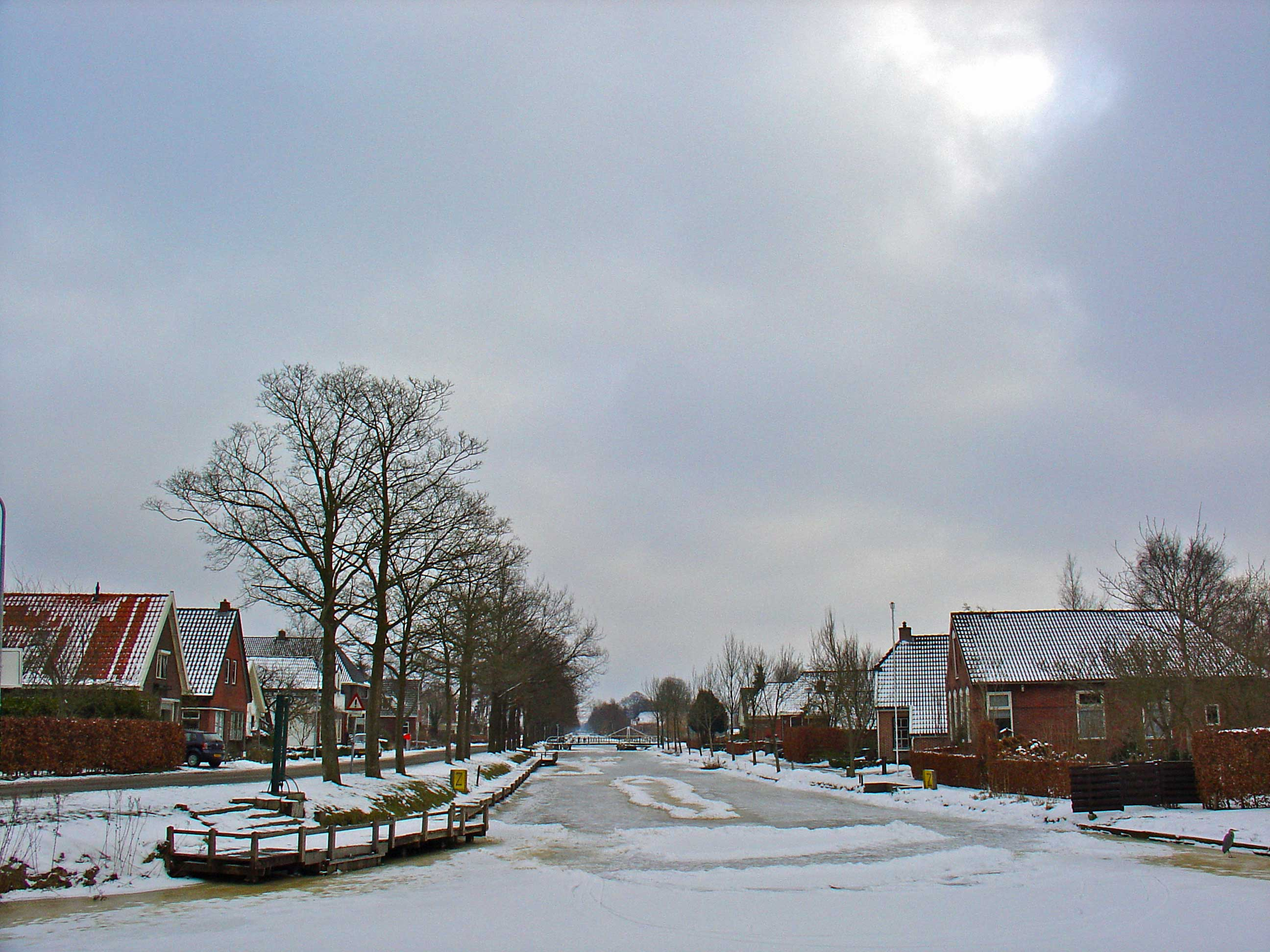
- Grevelingskanaal (canal) at Annerveenschekanaal

- Flag

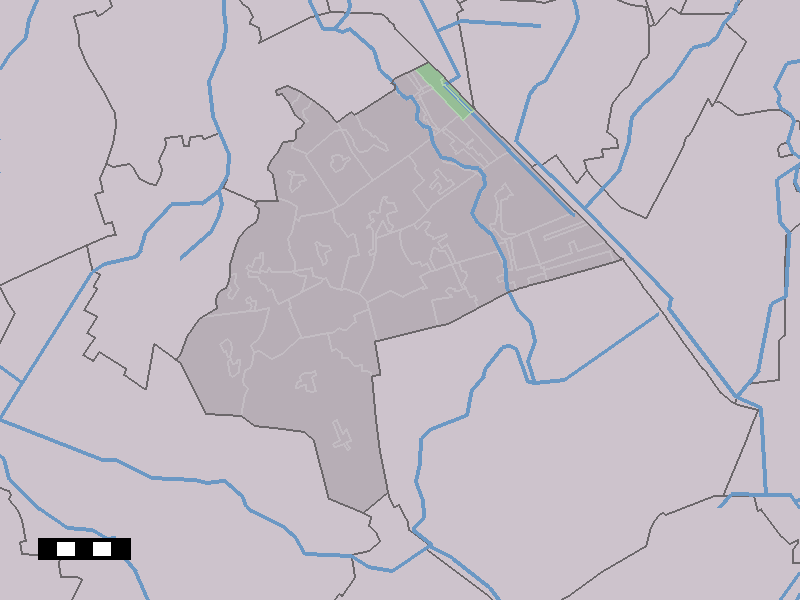
- Annerveenschekanaal in the municipality of Aa en Hunze.

- Location in the Netherlands Annerveenschekanaal (Netherlands)
- Coordinates: 53°4′40″N 6°48′5″E
- Country: Netherlands
- Province: Drenthe
- Municipality: Aa en Hunze

Area
  - Total: 3.25 km^{2} (1.25 sq mi)
- Elevation: 2.0 m (6.6 ft)

Population (2021)
  - Total: 400
  - Density: 120/km^{2} (320/sq mi)
- Time zone: UTC+1 (CET)
  - Summer (DST): UTC+2 (CEST)
- Postal code: 9654 & 9655
- Dialing code: 0598

Annerveenschekanaal is a village in the Dutch province of Drenthe. It is a part of the municipality of Aa en Hunze, and lies about 18 km east of Assen.

The statistical area "Annerveenschekanaal", which can also include the surrounding countryside, has a population of around 420.

The village was founded around 1770, when its name was Annerveensche Compagnie. The village is a linear settlement along the Grevelingskanaal. The canal has been named after Lambartus Grevijlink, co-owner of the Annerveensche Heerencompagnie, a company that exploited peat fields in the area.

There is a Dutch Reformed 'farmers-church' from 1836 in Annerveenschekanaal as well as Annerzathe, a country house from 1878. Annerveenschekanaal used to have a public elementary school but it closed in August 2015.

The village is on the Grevelingskanaal, and together with the smaller village of Eexterveenschekanaal forms part of the protected historic area Rijksbeschermd gezicht Annerveenschekanaal / Eexterveenschekanaal. In recent years the old swing bridges crossing the canal have been restored to their original condition and the canal is open for recreation.

== Transportation ==
There is no station here. The nearest stations are Assen railway station, Groningen railway station, Kropswolde railway station. Annerveenschekanaal is served by bus line 74, although it technically doesn't go into the village itself.

For further information see Aa en Hunze#Transportation.

== Notable people ==
- Addeke Hendrik Boerma (1912–1992), civil servant and first director of the UN World Food Programme.

== Gallery ==
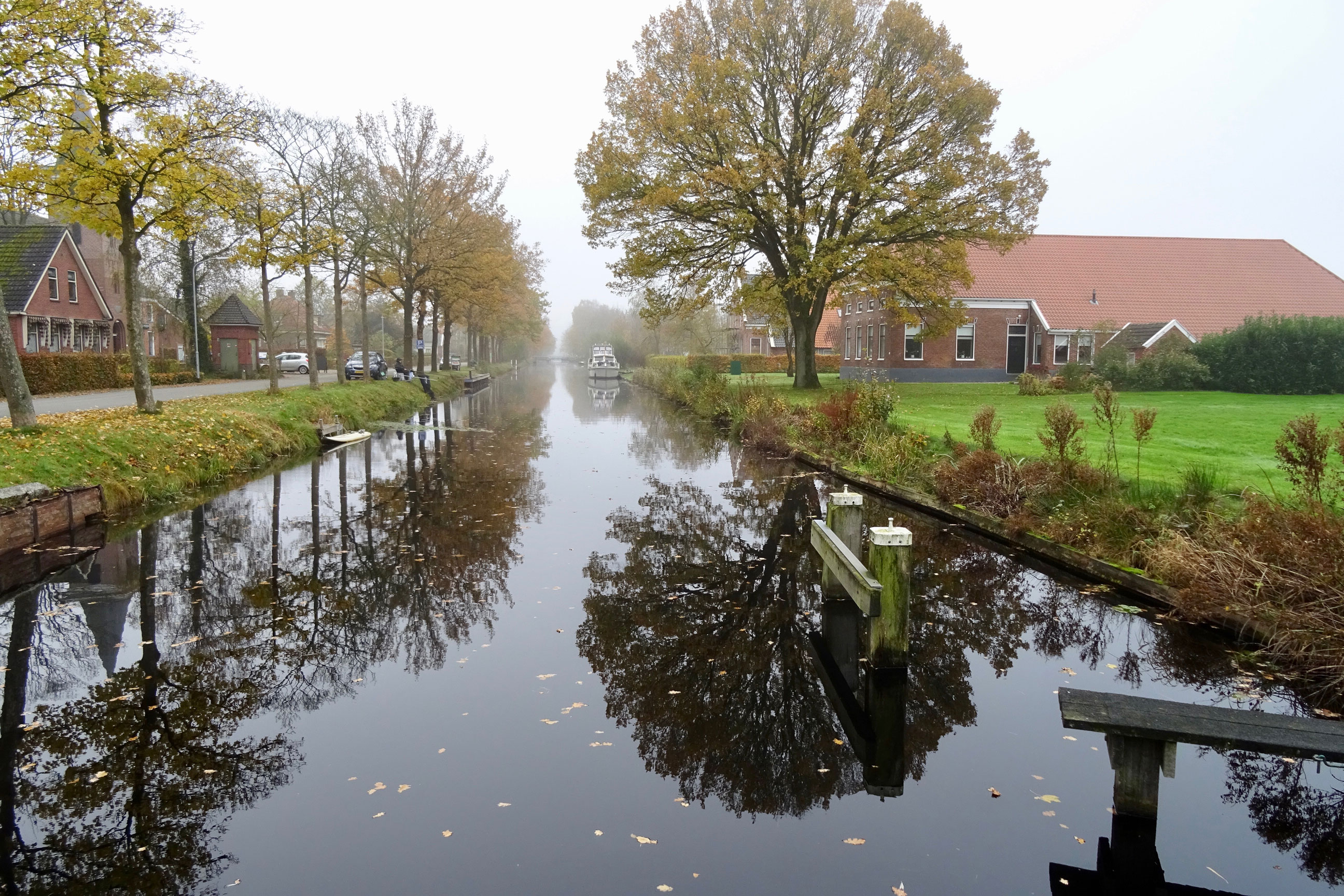
Canal view

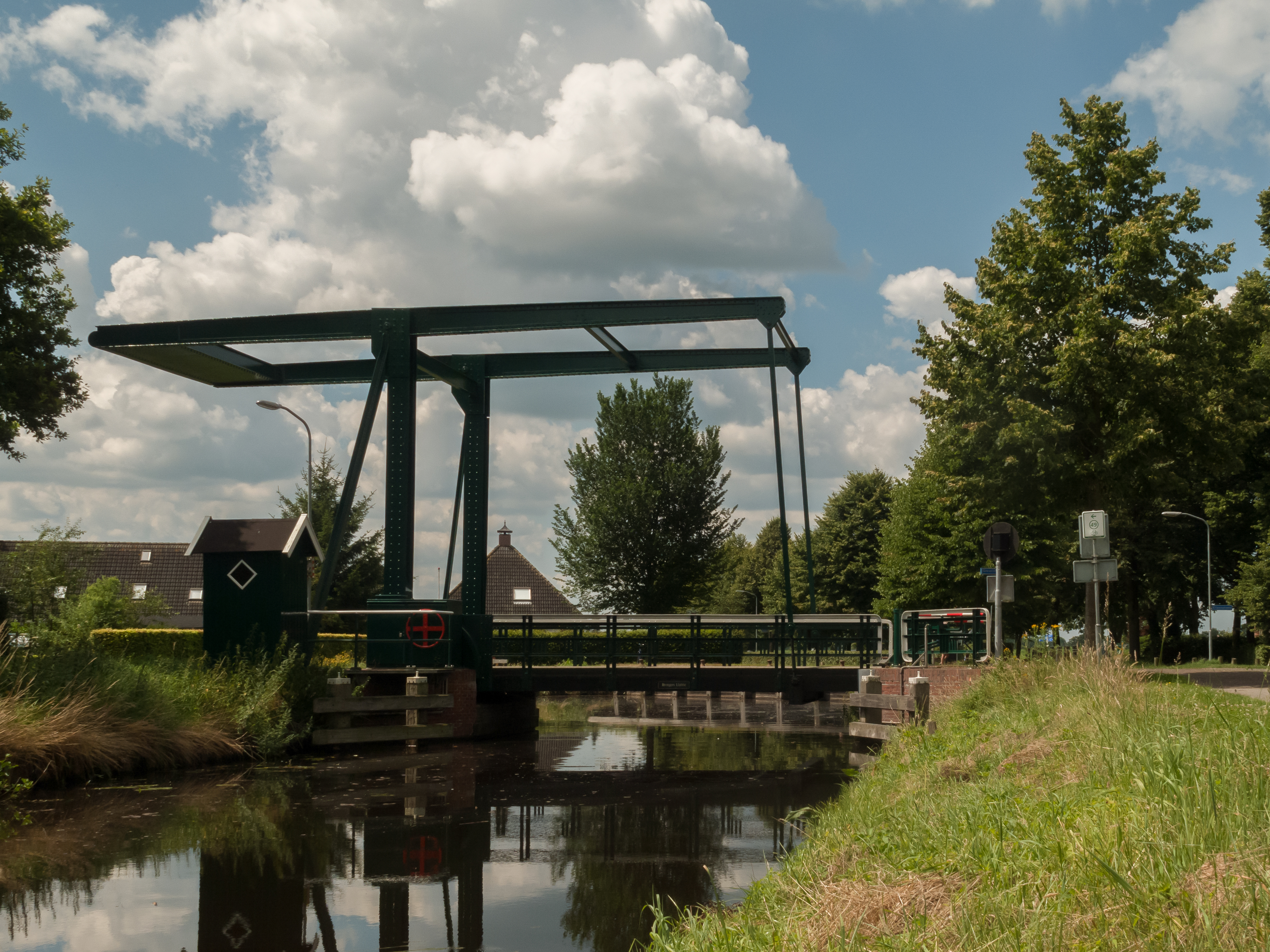
Draw bridge

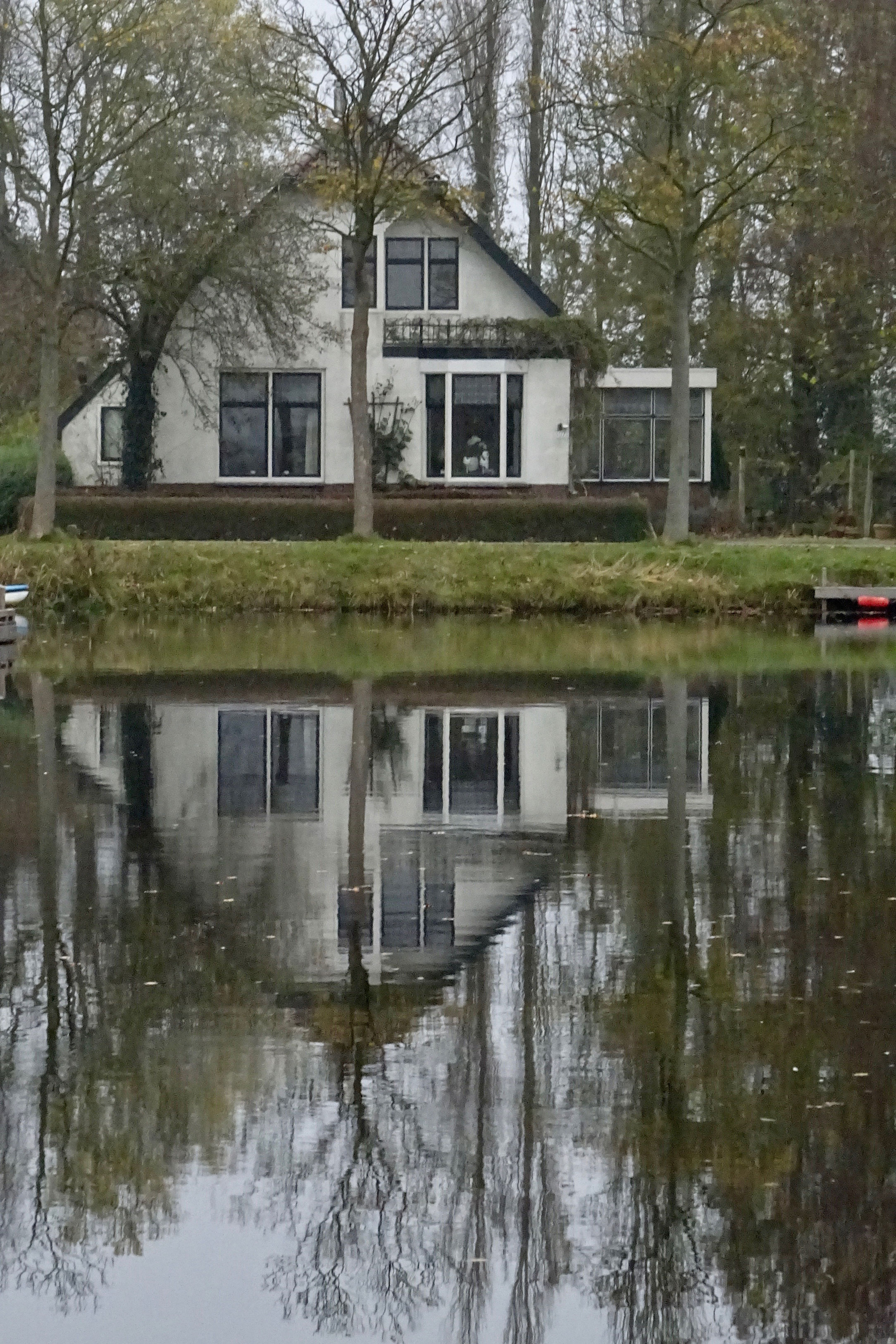
Farm in Annerveenschekanaal

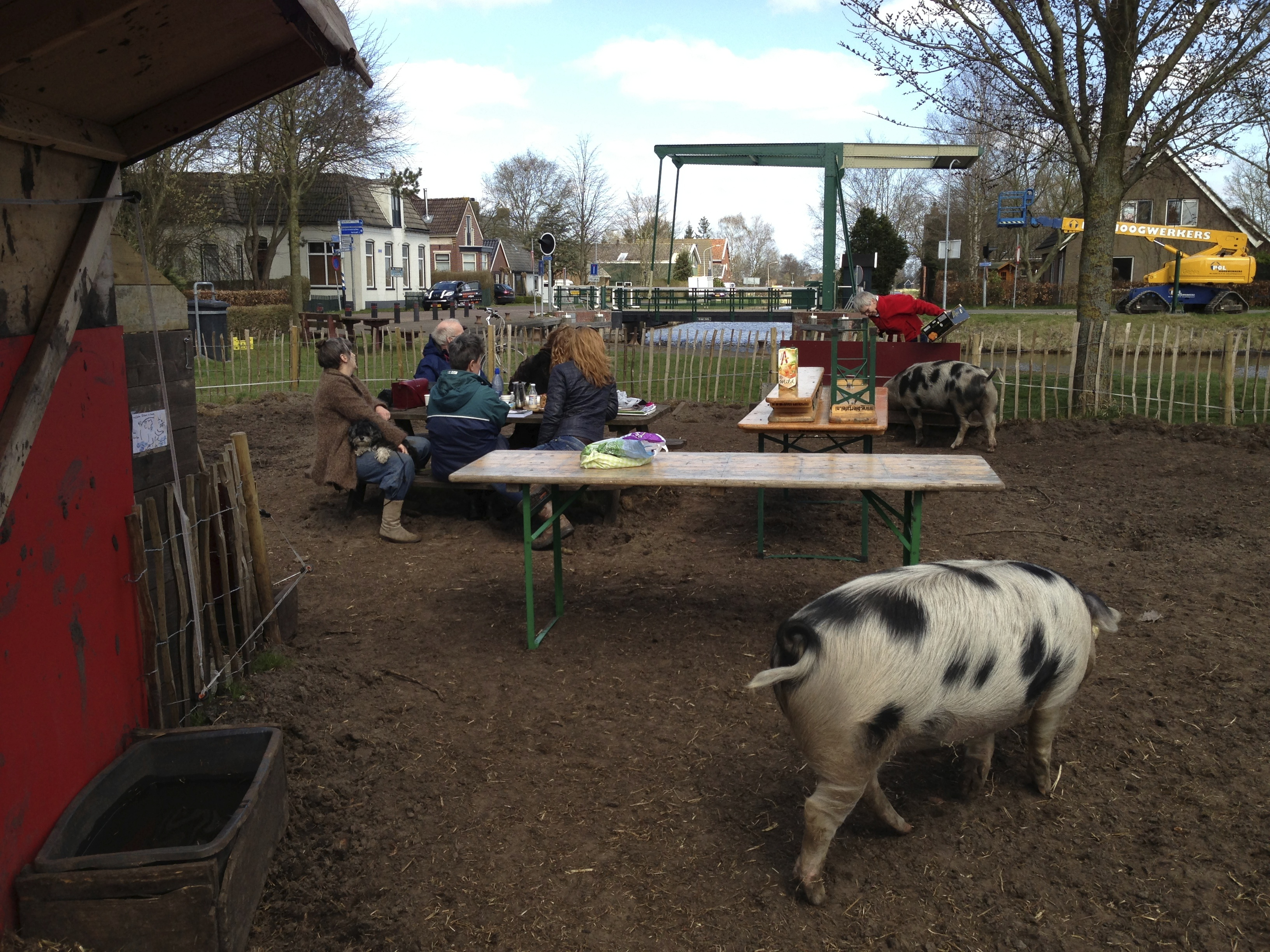
The pig house
