= Edouard Saouma =

Lebanese civil servant

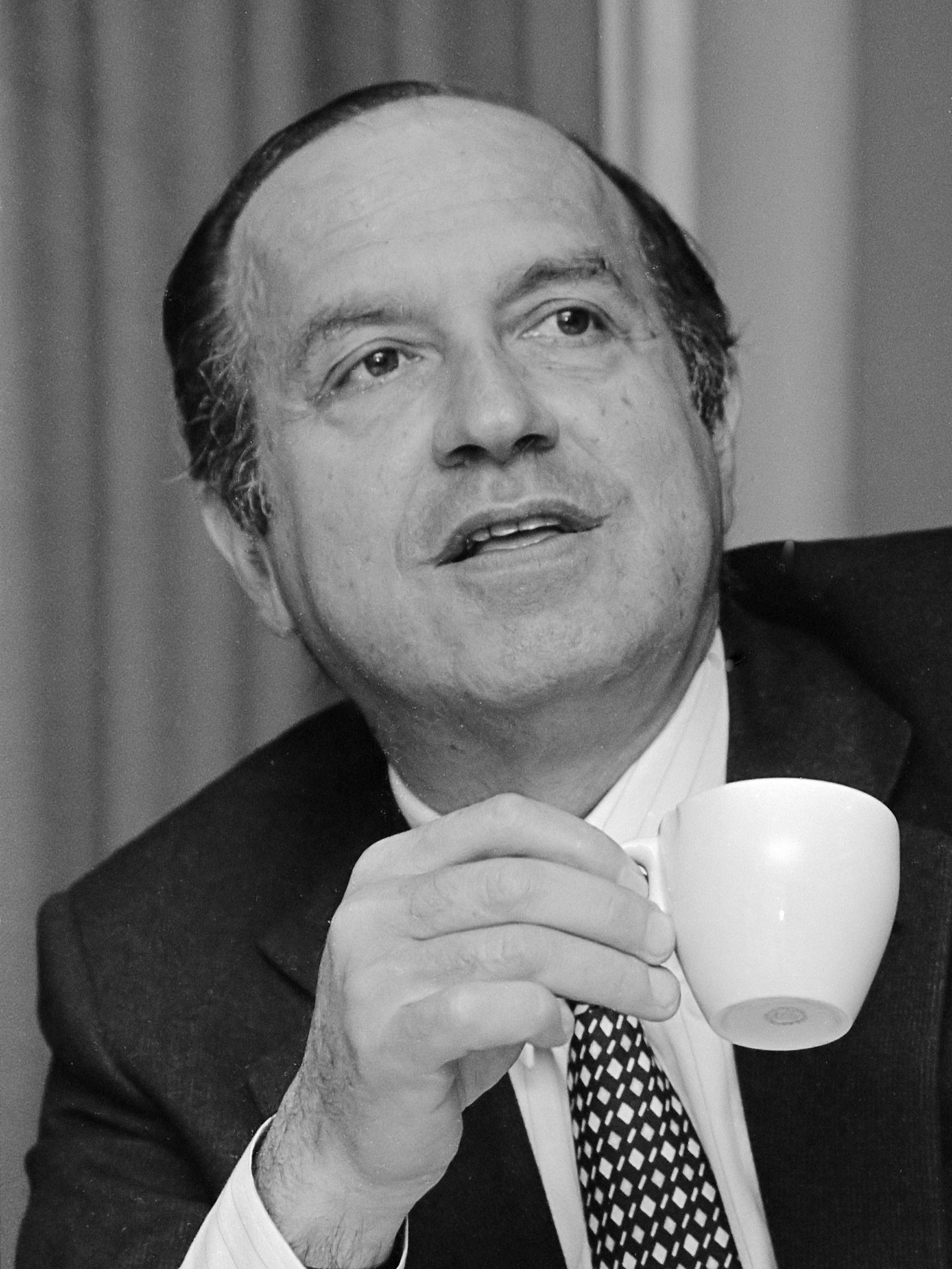

Director-General of Food and Agriculture Organization
- In office 1 January 1976 – 31 December 1993
- Preceded by: Addeke Hendrik Boerma
- Succeeded by: Jacques Diouf

Personal details
- Born: 6 November 1926 Beirut, Lebanon
- Died: 1 December 2012 (aged 85) Beirut, Lebanon
- Party: Democratic
- Spouse: Ines Forero
- Children: 3
- Education: École Nationale d'Agriculture de Montpellier

Edouard Victor Saouma (6 November 1926 – 1 December 2012) was a Lebanese civil servant who served as Director General of the Food and Agriculture Organization of the United Nations (FAO) for three consecutive terms from 1976 to 1993.

== Early career ==
After completing his studies at the École Nationale d'Agriculture de Montpellier (1949–1952), Saouma served as Director of the Agriculture Experimental Center of the Bekaa Valley, Lebanon (1952–62), Deputy Regional Representative of FAO for Asia and the Far East (1962–65), Director of the Land and Water Development Division of FAO (1965–75), and then Director General of the FAO.

== Camberley Group ==
The nations that wanted to replace Saouma in the 1987 elections concerted their strategy in secret meetings of what is known as the Camberley Group, after the town in England where the first meeting was held. The original members of the group were Australia, Britain, Canada, Denmark, Finland, West Germany, Japan, the Netherlands, Norway, Sweden and Switzerland. The U.S. was at first excluded because of the strong support given to Saouma by its ambassador Millicent Fenwick (a former member of Congress). This effort proved futile, as Saouma was re-elected.

== Legacy ==
Saouma's tenure at FAO was marked by dedication to (and support from) third world countries, his independence from major donor countries, US, Canada, Australia, and his numerous initiatives.. Yet many food experts believe that Saouma was more successful than he might have been otherwise in identifying the F.A.O. with the fight against global hunger.

Saouma's controversial leadership was assessed by an unclassified State Department message to American diplomatic posts which stated of Saouma: He has done an excellent job managing the organization and keeping internal program discipline. He has increased F.A.O.'s capacity to deliver technical assistance and strengthened its early warning system. Under his leadership, F.A.O. has steadily decreased the proportion of its budget which is devoted to administrative expenditures.

However, under Saouma's leadership FAO lost a substantial share of support from the United Nations Development Programme (UNDP) and from several industrial nations. This was caused by Saouma's withdrawing FAO Country Representatives from UNDP offices the world over and establishing separate FAO offices; UNDP reacted by executing its own agriculture projects, instead of financing their execution by FAO. Saouma also allowed FAO Fisheries Department to focus efforts and publicity on promoting and supporting the 200-mile "exclusive economic zones" of coastal nations. This led to exclusion or increasing the operational costs of major distant-waters fishing fleets that as a rule belonged to industrial nations and major FAO donors. The consequence was substantial reduction of donor-financed FAO fisheries projects. Finally, Saouma considerably increased the number of professional staff from developing countries at the expense of professionals from developed ones, which resulted in certain decline in FAO's general level of experience and expertise.

In recognition of his decisive role, the FAO Conference established in November 1993 the Edouard Saouma Award

== See also ==
- Addeke Hendrik Boerma
- Jacques Diouf

== Honors ==
- Grande Croix de l'ordre National du Cedre (Lebanon)
- Prix Said Akl (Lebanon)
- Chevalier Mérite Agricole (France)
- Commandeur de la Légion d'Honneur (France)
- Cavaliere di Gran Croce (Italy)
- Grand Officier de l'Ordre National (Chad)
- Grand Officier de l'ordre du Volta (Ghana)
- Grand-Croix de I'Ordre National de la Haute Volta (Burkina Faso)
- Grande Croix Merite Agricole (Spain)
- Knight Commander of the Order of Merit (Greece)
- Orden del Merito Agricola (Colombia)
- Gran Cruz de la Orden Nacional al Mento (Colombia)
- Gran Official de Orden de Vasco Nuiiez de Balboa (Panama)
- Orden al Merito Agricola (Peru)
- Order of Merit (Egypt)
- Ordre du Merite (Mauritania)
- Grand Officier de I'Ordre de la Republique (Tunisia)
- Grand Officier de I'Ordre National (Madagascar)
- Gran Orden de Rio Branco (Brazil)
- Banda Aquila Azteca (Mexico)
- Grande Croix Andres Bello (Venezuela)

== Honorary Doctorates ==
- University of Gembloux (Belgium)
- University of Agriculture Sciences of Godolla (Hungary)
- University of Keszphely (Hungary)
- Punjab Agricultural University (India)
- University of Jakarta (Indonesia)
- University of Bologna (Italy)
- University of Florence (Italy)
- University of Seoul (Republic of Korea)
- Universidad – Nacional Autonoma (Nicaragua)
- Faisalabad Agricultural University (Pakistan)
- Universidad Nacional Agraria La Molina (Peru)
- University of Los Baiios (Philippines)
- University of Warsaw (Poland)
- University of Uruguay
- Agricultural University of Prague (Czechoslovakia)
- Institut Tropical et sous Tropical (Czechoslovakia)
- Catholic University of America, Washington D.C. (USA)
- University of Montpellier (France)
- Instituto Superior Cienciads Agropecuarias de la Habana (Cuba)
- University of Mongolia
