= Food and Agriculture Organization =

Specialized agency of the United Nations

- Abbreviation: FAO
- Formation: 16 October 1945; 81 years ago
- Founded at: Quebec City, Canada
- Type: United Nations specialized agency
- Legal status: Active
- Headquarters: Rome, Italy
- Director-General: Qu Dongyu
- Parent organization: United Nations Economic and Social Council
- Staff: 3,202 (2022)
- Website: www.fao.org

The FAO Food Price Index (1961–2025). The average for 2014–2016 is set at 100. Real Nominal

The Food and Agriculture Organization of the United Nations (Note: French: Organisation des Nations unies pour l'alimentation et l'agriculture; Italian: Organizzazione delle Nazioni Unite per l'alimentazione e l'agricoltura.) (FAO) is a specialized agency of the United Nations that leads international efforts to defeat hunger and improve nutrition and food security. Its Latin motto, fiat panis, translates to "let there be bread". It was founded on 16 October 1945 in Quebec City, Canada.

The FAO comprises 194 members, including 193 countries and one member organization, the European Union (EU). Its headquarters is in Rome, Italy, and it maintains regional and field offices worldwide, operating in over 130 countries. It helps governments and development agencies coordinate their activities to improve and develop agriculture, forestry, fisheries, and land and water resources. It also conducts research, provides technical assistance to projects, operates educational and training programs, and collects agricultural output, production, and development data.

The FAO is governed by a biennial conference representing each member country and the EU, which elects a 49-member executive council. As of 2019, the director-general is Qu Dongyu of China, who serves as the chief administrative officer. Various committees govern matters such as finance, programs, agriculture, and fisheries.

100 lire (FAO's celebration.)
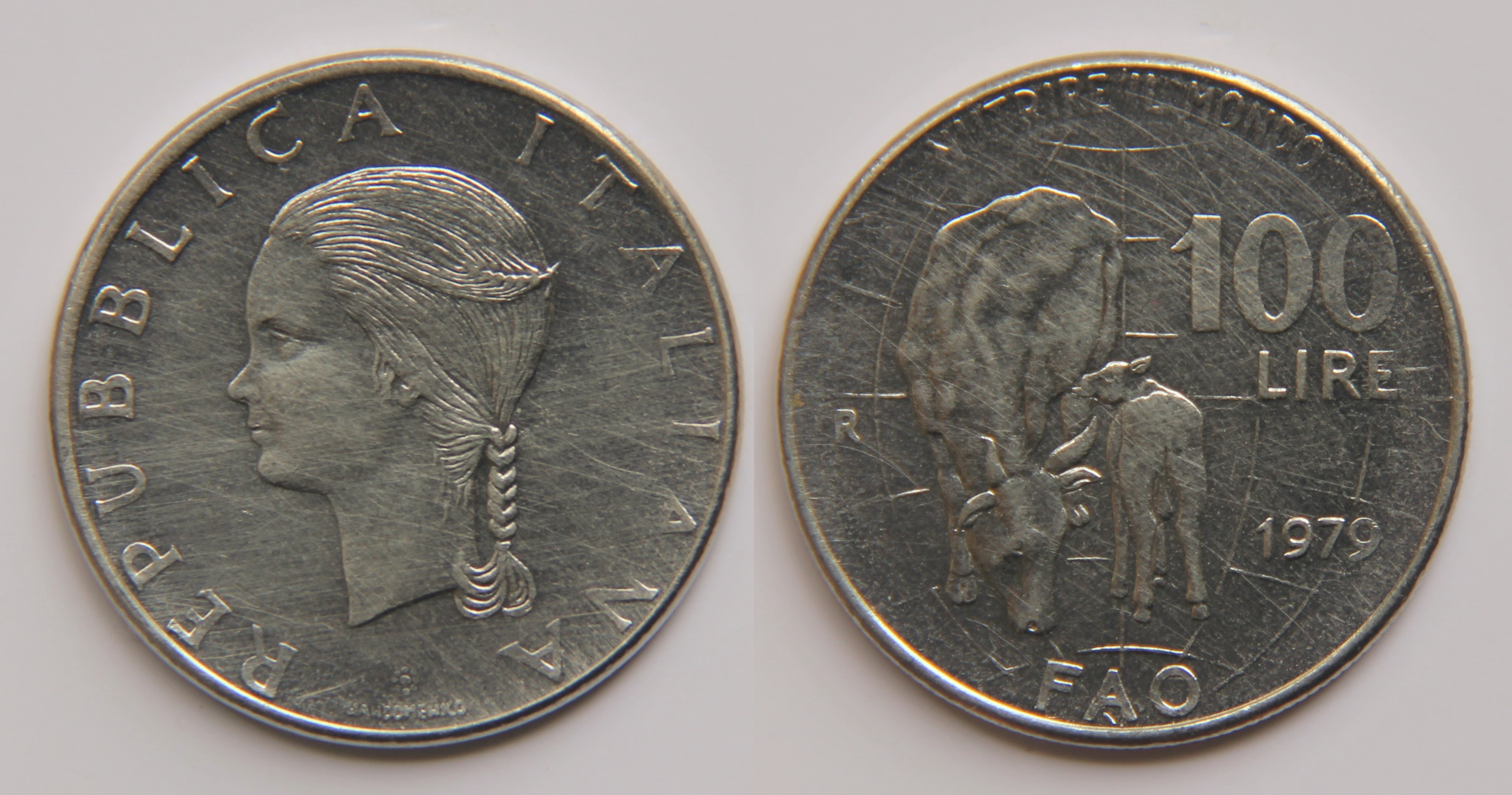
First side of the image: Obverse: Young woman with braid facing left. Surrounded by Repubblica Italiana [Italian Republic].
Second side of the image: Reverse: Cow nursing calf, face value & date. FAO at bottom and Nutrire il Mondo [Feed the world] at top.
Coin minted by Italy in the 1970s to celebrate and promote the Food and Agriculture Organization.

== History ==
The idea of an international organization for food and agriculture emerged in the late 19th and early 20th century, advanced primarily by Polish-born American agriculturalist and activist David Lubin. In May–June 1905, an international conference was held in Rome, Italy, which led to the creation of the International Institute of Agriculture (IIA) by the King of Italy, Victor Emmanuel III.

The IIA was the first intergovernmental organization to deal with the problems and challenges of agriculture on a global scale. It worked primarily to collect, compile, and publish data on agriculture, ranging from output statistics to a catalog of crop diseases. Among its achievements was the publication of the first agricultural census in 1930.

World War II effectively ended the IIA. During the war, in 1943, United States president Franklin D. Roosevelt called a League of Nations Conference on Food and Agriculture, which brought representatives from forty-four governments to The Omni Homestead Resort in Hot Springs, Virginia, from 18 May to 3 June to attend the Hot Springs Conference. The main impetus for the conference was the British-born Australian economist Frank L. McDougall, who since 1935 had advocated for an international forum to address hunger and malnutrition.

The Conference ended with a commitment to establish a permanent organization for food and agriculture, which was achieved on 16 October 1945 in Quebec City, Canada, following the Constitution of the Food and Agriculture Organization. The first session of the FAO Conference began the same day in the Château Frontenac in Quebec City and ended on 1 November 1945. This was led by Sir John Boyd Orr where his work on ending world hunger and creation of FAO resulted in him winning the Nobel Peace Prize in 1949.

After the war, the IIA was officially dissolved by resolution of its Permanent Committee on 27 February 1948. Its functions, facilities, and mandate were then transferred to the newly established FAO, which maintained its headquarters in Rome.

The FAO's initial functions supported agricultural and nutrition research and provided technical assistance to member countries to boost production in agriculture, fishery, and forestry. Beginning in the 1960s, it focused on efforts to develop high-yield strains of grain, eliminate protein deficiency, promote rural employment, and increase agricultural exports. The FAO recognized the decrease of these resources as an urgent problem in 1961 and created a joint collaboration with the International Biological Program (IBP) in 1967. To that end, it joined the UN General Assembly in creating the UN World Food Programme, the largest humanitarian organization addressing hunger and promoting food security.

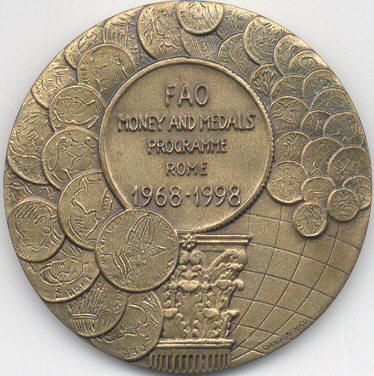
FAO Commemorative 1998 30th Anniv MM Programme Bronze Obverse

The FAO launched what would become the FAO Money and Medals Programme (MMP) in 1968. FAO issued collector art medals in various series to bring attention to FAO's goals and missions. This program was responsible for over a hundred medal designs issued to the collecting public. A thirtieth anniversary medal of the MMP was issued in 1998.

In 1974, in response to famine in Africa, the FAO convened the first World Food Summit to address widespread hunger, malnutrition, and food insecurity. The meeting resulted in a proclamation that "every man, woman, and child has the inalienable right to be free from hunger and malnutrition to develop their physical and mental faculties" and a global commitment to eradicate these issues within a decade. A subsequent summit in 1996 addressed the shortcomings in achieving this goal while establishing a strategic plan for eliminating hunger and malnutrition into the 21st century.

Every year, FAO publishes a number of major 'State of the World' reports related to food, agriculture, forestry, fisheries and natural resources.

== Structure and finance ==
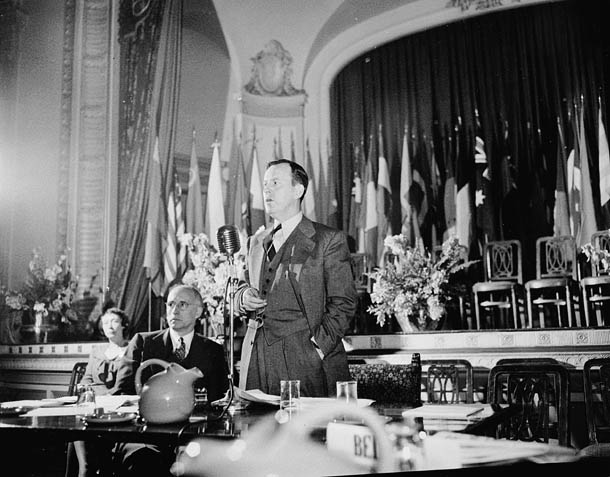
Lester Bowles Pearson presiding at a plenary session of the founding conference of the United Nations Food and Agriculture Organization. October 1945.

In 1951, the FAO's headquarters were moved from Washington, D.C., United States, to Rome, Italy. The agency is directed by the Conference of Member Nations, which meets every two years to review the work carried out by the organization and to Work and Budget for the next two-year period. The conference elects a council of 49 member states (serve three-year rotating terms) that acts as an interim governing body, and the director-general, who heads the agency.

The FAO is composed of eight departments: Agriculture and Consumer Protection, Climate, Biodiversity, Land and Water Department, Economic and Social Development, Fisheries and Aquaculture, Forestry, Corporate Services and Technical Cooperation and Programme Management.

Beginning in 1994, the FAO underwent the most significant restructuring since its founding, to decentralize operations, streamline procedures and reduce costs. As a result, savings of about US$50 million, €43 million a year were realized.

=== Budget ===
The FAO's Regular Programme budget is funded by its members through contributions set at the FAO Conference. This budget covers core technical work, cooperation and partnerships including the Technical Cooperation Programme, knowledge exchange, policy and advocacy, direction and administration, governance and security.

The total FAO Budget planned for 2018–2019 is US$1,005.6 million. The voluntary contributions provided by members and other partners support mechanical and emergency (including rehabilitation) assistance to governments for clearly defined purposes linked to the results framework, as well as direct support to FAO's core work. The voluntary contributions are expected to reach approximately US$1.6 billion in 2016–2017.

This overall budget covers core technical work, cooperation and partnerships, leading to Food and Agriculture Outcomes at 71 percent; Core Functions at 11 percent; the Country Office Network – 5 percent; Capital and Security Expenditure – 2 percent; Administration – 6 percent; and Technical and Cooperation Program – 5 percent.

=== Directors-General ===
- John Boyd Orr, October 1945 – April 1948
- Norris E. Dodd, April 1948 – December 1953
- Philip V. Cardon, January 1954 – April 1956
- Herbert Broadley, (acting) April 1956 – November 1956
- Binay Ranjan Sen, November 1956 – December 1967
- Addeke Hendrik Boerma, January 1968 – December 1975
- Edouard Saouma, January 1976 – December 1993
- Jacques Diouf, January 1994 – December 2011
- José Graziano da Silva, January 2012 – July 2019
- Qu Dongyu, August 2019 – present

=== Deputy Directors-General ===
- William Nobel Clark: 1948
- Sir Herbert Broadley: 1948 – 1958
- Friedrich Traugott Wahlen: 1958 – 1959
- Norman C. Wright: 1959 – 1963
- Oris V. Wells: 1963 – 1971
- Roy I. Jackson: 1971 – 1978
- Ralph W. Phillips: 1978 – 1981
- Edward M. West: 1981 – 1985
- Declan J. Walton: 1986 – 1987
- Howard Hjort: 1992 – 1997
- Vikram J. Shah (ad personam): 1992 – 1995
- David A. Harcharik: 1998 – 2007
- James G. Butler: 2008 – 2010
- He Changchui (Operations): 2009 – 2011
- Ann Tutwiler (Knowledge): 2011 – 2012
- Manoj Juneja (Operations): 2011 – 2012
- Dan Gustafson (Programmes): 2012 – 2020
- Maria Helena Semedo: 2013 – 2017
- Laurent Thomas: 2017 – 2023
- Beth Bechdol: 2020 – present
- Maurizio Martina: 2023 – present
- Godfrey Magwenzi: 2024 - present

== Offices ==
=== FAO Headquarters ===
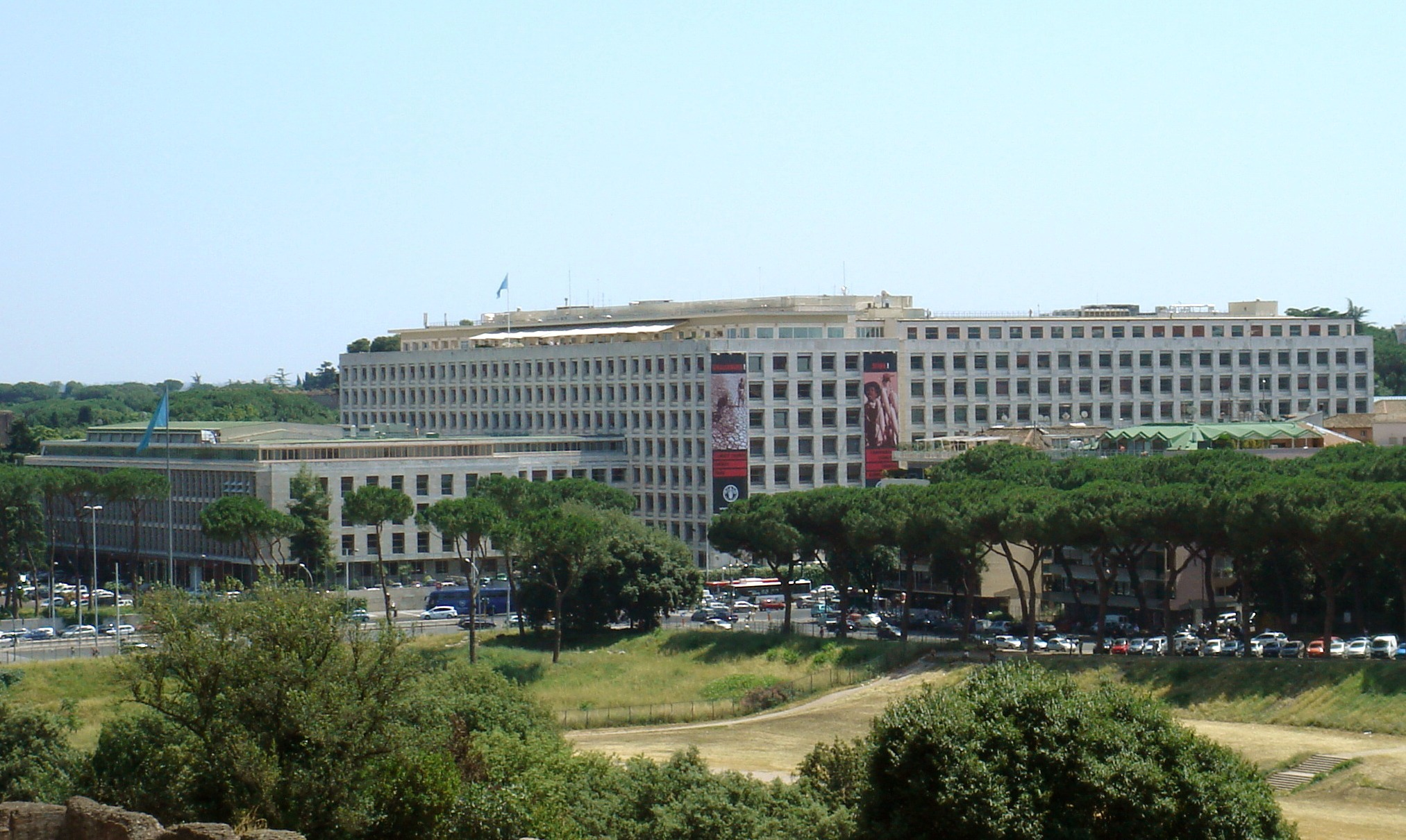
FAO Headquarters in Rome

The world headquarters is located in Rome, in the former seat of the Department of Italian East Africa. One of the most notable features of the building was the Axum Obelisk which stood in front of the agency seat, although just outside the territory allocated to the FAO by the Italian Government. It was taken from Ethiopia by Benito Mussolini's troops in 1937 as war booty and returned on 18 April 2005.

=== Regional Offices ===
- Regional Office for Africa, in Accra, Ghana
- Regional Office for Asia and the Pacific, in Bangkok, Thailand
- Regional Office for Europe and Central Asia, in Budapest, Hungary
- Regional Office for Latin America and the Caribbean, in Santiago de Chile, Chile
- Regional Office for the Near East, in Cairo, Egypt

=== Sub-regional Offices ===
- Sub-regional Office for Central Africa (SFC), in Libreville, Gabon
- Sub-regional Office for Central Asia, in Ankara, Turkey
- Sub-regional Office for Eastern Africa (SFE), in Addis Ababa, Ethiopia
- Sub-regional Office for Mesoamerica (SLM), in Panama City, Panama
- Sub-regional Office for North Africa, in Tunis, Tunisia
- Sub-regional Office for Southern Africa and East Africa, in Harare, Zimbabwe
- Sub-regional Office for the Caribbean, in Bridgetown, Barbados
- Sub-regional Office for the Gulf Cooperation Council States and Yemen, in Abu Dhabi, United Arab Emirates
- Sub-regional Office for the Pacific Islands, in Apia, Samoa

=== Liaison Offices ===
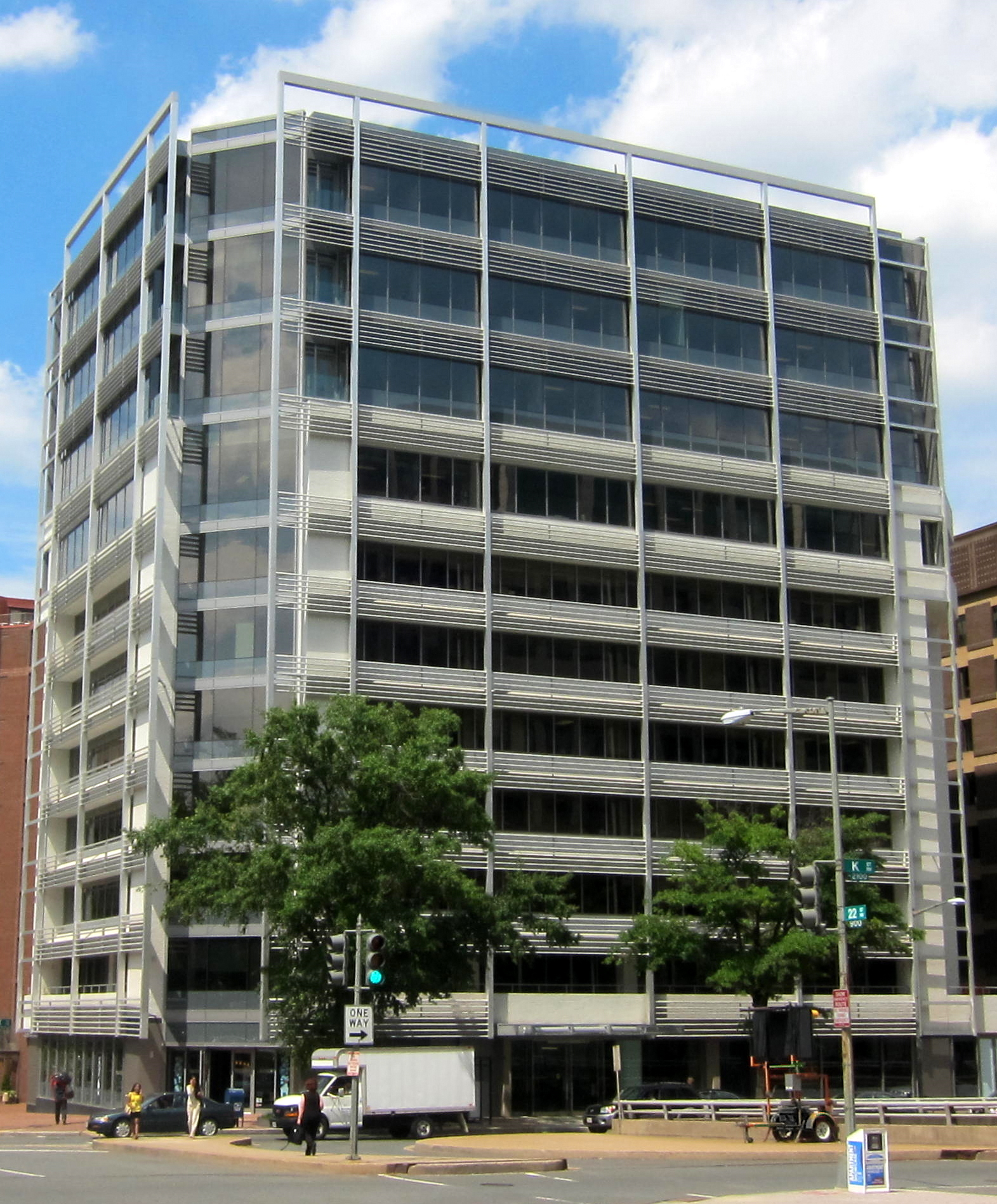
Liaison Office for North America in Washington, D.C.

- Liaison Office for North America, in Washington, D.C., United States
- Liaison Office with Japan, in Yokohama
- Liaison Office with the European Union and Belgium, in Brussels
- Liaison Office with the Russian Federation, in Moscow
- Liaison Office with the United Nations, in Geneva, Switzerland
- Liaison Office with the United Nations, in New York City, United States

=== Partnership and Liaison Offices ===
Partnership and Liaison Offices provide for stronger country participation in the FAO's work and programmes at national, sub-regional, regional, and inter-regional levels, and enhanced cooperation through unilateral trust fund projects and South–South cooperation.

- Azerbaijan
- Cameroon
- Ivory Coast
- Equatorial Guinea
- Kazakhstan
- Mexico
- South Korea

== Priority work areas ==
FAO has outlined the following priorities in its fight against hunger.

- Help eliminate hunger, food insecurity, and malnutrition – contribute to eradicating hunger by facilitating policies and political commitments to support food security and make sure that up-to-date information about hunger and nutrition challenges and solutions is available and accessible.
- Make agriculture, forestry, and fisheries more productive and sustainable – promote evidence-based policies and practices to support highly productive agricultural sectors (crops, livestock, forestry, and fisheries) while ensuring that the natural resource base does not suffer in the process.
- Reduce rural poverty by helping the rural poor gain access to the resources and services they need, including rural employment and social protection.
- Enable inclusive and efficient agricultural and food systems – helping to build safe and efficient food systems that support smallholder agriculture and reduce poverty and hunger in rural areas.
- Increase the resilience of livelihoods to threats and crises – helping countries to prepare for natural and human-caused disasters by reducing their risk and enhancing the resilience of their food and agricultural systems.

Two fundamental areas of work – gender and governance – are fully integrated in the above strategic objective action plans.

== Programmes and achievements ==
=== Codex Alimentarius ===
FAO and the World Health Organization created the Codex Alimentarius Commission in 1961 to develop food standards, guidelines, and texts such as codes of practice under the Joint FAO/WHO Food Standards Programme. The programme's main aims are protecting consumer health, ensuring fair trade, and promoting co-ordination of all food standards work undertaken by intergovernmental and non-governmental organizations.

The monthly FAO Food Price Index (1990–2025) in real terms. The average for 2014–2016 is set at 100. Food Price Index Meat Dairy Cereals Oils Sugar

==== World Food Summit ====
In 1996, FAO organized the World Food Summit, attended by 112 Heads or Deputy Heads of State and Government. The Summit concluded with the signing of the Rome Declaration, which established the goal of halving the number of people who suffer from hunger by 2015. At the same time, 1,200 civil society organizations (CSOs) from 80 countries participated in an NGO forum. The forum was critical of the growing industrialization of agriculture and called upon governments – and FAO – to do more to protect the 'Right to Food' for the poor.

==== TeleFood ====
In 1997, FAO launched TeleFood, a campaign of concerts, sporting events, and other activities to harness the power of media, celebrities, and concerned citizens to help fight hunger. Since its start, the campaign has generated close to US$28 million, €15 million in donations. Money raised through TeleFood pays for small, sustainable projects that help small-scale farmers produce more food for their families and communities.

The projects provide tangible resources, such as fishing equipment, seeds, and agricultural implements. They vary enormously, from helping families raise pigs in Venezuela through creating school gardens in Cape Verde and Mauritania or providing school lunches in Uganda and teaching children to grow food to raising fish in a leper community in India.

==== FAO Goodwill Ambassadors ====
The FAO Goodwill Ambassadors Programme was initiated in 1999. It was created to increase public awareness and disseminate information about issues related to food security and hunger in the world.

==== Right to Food Guidelines ====
In 2004 the Right to Food Guidelines were adopted which offer guidance to states on how to implement their obligations on the right to food.

==== Response to food crisis ====
In December 2007, FAO launched its Initiative on soaring food prices to help small producers raise their output and earn more. Under the initiative, FAO contributed to the work of the UN High-Level Task Force on the Global Food Crisis, which produced the Comprehensive Framework for Action. FAO has carried out projects in over 25 countries and inter-agency missions in nearly 60, scaled up its monitoring through the Global Information and Early Warning System on Food and Agriculture, provided policy advice to governments while supporting their efforts to increase food production, and advocated for more investment in agriculture as well as provided funding to distribute and multiply quality seeds in Haiti, which has significantly increased food production, thereby providing cheaper food.

==== FAO–EU partnership ====
In May 2009, FAO and the European Union signed an initial aid package worth €125 million to support small farmers in countries hit hard by rising food prices. The aid package falls under the EU's €1 billion Food Facility, set up with the UN Secretary-General's High-Level Task Force on the Global Food Crisis and FAO to focus on programmes that will have a quick but lasting impact on food security. FAO is receiving around €200 million for work in 25 countries, of which €15.4 million goes to Zimbabwe.

==== Food security programmes ====
The Special Programme for Food Security is FAO's flagship initiative for reaching the goal of halving the number of hungry in the world by 2015 (currently estimated at close to 1 billion people) as part of its commitment to the Millennium Development Goals. Through projects in over 100 countries worldwide, the programme promotes effective, tangible solutions to eliminating hunger, undernourishment, and poverty. Currently, 102 countries are engaged in the programme, and of these, approximately 30 have begun shifting from pilot to national programmes. To maximize the impact of its work, FAO strongly promotes national ownership and local empowerment in the countries in which it operates.

In September 2026, former EU Commissioner Phil Hogan stated that because the Trump administration had reduced foreign aid by undermining and restructuring the U.S. Agency for International Development (USAID), other nations needed to make up for the resulting funding shortfall at the UN Food and Agriculture Organization (FAO).

==== Online campaign against hunger ====
The 1billionhungry project became the EndingHunger campaign in April 2011. Spearheaded by FAO in partnership with other UN agencies and private nonprofit groups, the EndingHunger movement pushes the boundaries of conventional public advocacy. It builds on the success in 2010 of The 1billonhungry project and the subsequent chain of public events that led to the collection of over three million signatures on a global petition to end hunger (www.EndingHunger.org). The petition was originally presented to representatives of world governments at a ceremony in Rome on 30 November 2010.

The web and partnerships are two pivotal and dynamic aspects of EndingHunger. The campaign relies on the assistance of organizations and institutions that can facilitate the project's diffusion, by placing banners on their own websites or organizing events aimed to raise awareness of the project. In its 2011 season, the campaign expanded its multimedia content, pursued mutual visibility arrangements with partner organizations, and sharpened its focus on 14- to 25-year-olds, who were encouraged to understand their potential as a social movement to push for the end of hunger.

Moreover, the EndingHunger project is a viral communication campaign, renewing and expanding its efforts to build the movement through Facebook, Twitter and other social networks. Those who sign the petition can spread the link of the EndingHunger website to their friends, via social media or mail, in order to gain awareness and signatures for the petition. The next interim objective is to grow the EndingHunger movement's Facebook community to 1 million members. As with the petition, the more people who get involved, the more powerful the message to governments: "We are no longer willing to accept the fact that hundreds of millions live in chronic hunger." Groups and individuals can also decide on their own to organize an event about the project, simply by gathering friends, whistles, T-shirts and banners (whistles and T-shirts can be ordered, and petition sign sheets downloaded, on the endinghunger.org website) and thereby alert people about chronic hunger by using the yellow whistle.

The original 1billionhungry campaign borrowed as its slogan the line "I'm as mad as hell, and I'm not going to take this anymore!", used by Peter Finch in the 1976 film, Network. Meanwhile, the yellow whistle has been the campaign symbol from the start, from 1billionhungry to Ending Hunger. (The creative concept was provided by the McCann Erickson Italy Communication Agency.) It symbolizes the fact that we are "blowing the whistle" on the silent disaster of hunger. It is both a symbol and – at many live events taking place around the world – a physical means of expressing frustration and making some noise about the hunger situation.

Both The 1billionhungry and the EndingHunger campaigns have continued to attract UN Goodwill Ambassadors from the worlds of music and cinema, literature, sport, activism and government. Some of the well known individuals who have become involved include former Brazilian President Luiz Inácio Lula da Silva, former presidents of Chile Ricardo Lagos and Michelle Bachelet, actress Susan Sarandon, actors Jeremy Irons and Raul Bova, singers Céline Dion and Anggun, authors Isabelle Allende and Andrea Camilleri, musician Chucho Valdés and Olympic track-and-field legend Carl Lewis.

=== Agriculture ===
==== International Plant Protection Convention ====
FAO created the International Plant Protection Convention or IPPC in 1952. This international treaty organization works to prevent the international spread of pests and plant diseases in both cultivated and wild plants. Among its functions are the maintenance of lists of plant pests, tracking of pest outbreaks, and coordination of technical assistance between member nations. As of July 2018, 183 contracting parties have ratified the treaty.

==== Plant Treaty (ITPGRFA) ====
FAO is depositary of the International Treaty on Plant Genetic Resources for Food and Agriculture, also called Plant Treaty, Seed Treaty or ITPGRFA, entered into force on 29 June 2004.

==== Alliance Against Hunger and Malnutrition ====
The Alliance Against Hunger and Malnutrition (AAHM) aims to address how countries and organizations can be more effective in advocating and carrying out actions to address hunger and malnutrition. As a global partnership, AAHM creates global connections between local, regional, national and international institutions that share the goals of fighting hunger and malnutrition. The organization works to address food security by enhancing resources and knowledge sharing and strengthening hunger activities within countries and across state lines at the regional and international levels.

Following the World Food Summit, the Alliance was initially created in 2002 as the 'International Alliance Against Hunger (IAAH)' to strengthen and coordinate national efforts in the fight against hunger and malnutrition. The mission of the Alliance originates from the first and eighth UN Millennium Development Goals; reducing the number of people that suffer from hunger in half by 2015 (preceded by the "Rome Declaration" in 1996) and developing a global partnership for development. The Alliance was founded by the Rome-based food agencies – the Food and Agriculture Organization of the United Nations (FAO), UN World Food Programme (WFP), International Fund for Agricultural Development (IFAD), – and Bioversity International.

AAHM connects top-down and bottom-up anti-hunger development initiatives, linking governments, UN organizations, and NGOs together in order to increase effectiveness through unity.

==== Integrated pest management ====
During the 1990s, FAO took a leading role in the promotion of integrated pest management for rice production in Asia. Hundreds of thousands of farmers were trained using an approach known as the Farmer Field School (FFS). Like many of the programmes managed by FAO, the funds for Farmer Field Schools came from bilateral Trust Funds, with Australia, Netherlands, Norway and Switzerland acting as the leading donors. FAO's efforts in this area have drawn praise from NGOs that have otherwise criticized much of the work of the organization.

==== Trans-boundary pests and diseases ====
FAO established an Emergency Prevention System for Transboundary Animal and Plant Pests and Diseases in 1994, focusing on the control of diseases like rinderpest, foot-and-mouth disease and avian flu by helping governments coordinate their responses. One key element is the Global Rinderpest Eradication Programme, which has advanced to a stage where large tracts of Asia and Africa have now been free of the cattle disease rinderpest for an extended period of time. Meanwhile, the Desert Locust Information Service monitors the worldwide locust situation and keeps affected countries and donors informed of expected developments.

==== Global Partnership Initiative for Plant Breeding Capacity Building ====
The Global Partnership Initiative for Plant Breeding Capacity Building (GIPB) is a global partnership dedicated to increasing plant breeding capacity building. The mission of GIPB is to enhance the capacity of developing countries to improve crops for food security and sustainable development through better plant breeding and delivery systems. The ultimate goal is to ensure that a critical mass of plant breeders, leaders, managers and technicians, donors and partners are linked together through an effective global network.

==== Investment in agriculture ====
FAO's technical cooperation department hosts an Investment Centre that promotes greater investment in agriculture and rural development by helping developing countries identify and formulate sustainable agricultural policies, programmes and projects. It mobilizes funding from multilateral institutions such as the World Bank, regional development banks and international funds as well as FAO resources.

==== Globally Important Agricultural Heritage Systems (GIAHS) ====
The Globally Important Agricultural Heritage Systems (GIAHS) Partnership Initiative was conceptualized and presented by Parviz Koohafkan the Task Manager of Chapter 10 of Agenda 21 in Food and Agricultural Organization of United Nations, FAO in 2002 during World Summit on Sustainable Development in Johannesburg, South Africa. This UN Partnership Initiative aims to identify, support and safeguard Globally Important Agricultural Heritage Systems and their livelihoods, agricultural and associated biodiversity, landscapes, knowledge systems and cultures around the world. The GIAHS Partnership recognizes the crucial importance of the well-being of family farming communities in an integrated approach while directing activities towards sustainable agriculture and rural development.

==== Commission on Genetic Resources for Food and Agriculture (CGRFA) ====
The Commission on Genetic Resources for Food and Agriculture, established in 1983, provides an intergovernmental forum that specifically addresses biological diversity for food and agriculture. Its main objective is to ensure the sustainable use and conservation of biodiversity for food and agriculture and the fair and equitable sharing of benefits derived from its use, for present and future generations.

==== Animal Genetic Resources ====
FAO has a unit focused on Animal Genetic Resources, which are defined as "those animal species that are used, or may be used, for the production of food and agriculture, and the populations within each of them. These populations within each species can be classified as wild and feral populations, land-races and primary populations, standardized breeds, selected lines, varieties, strains and any conserved genetic material; all of which are currently categorized as Breeds." FAO assists countries in implementation of the Global Plan of Action for Animal Genetic Resources. FAO supports a variety of ex situ and in situ conservation strategies including cryoconservation of animal genetic resources.

=== Forestry ===
One of FAO's strategic goals is the sustainable management of the world's forests. The Forestry Division works to balance social and environmental considerations with the economic needs of rural populations living in forest areas. FAO serves as a neutral forum for policy dialogue, as a reliable source of information on forests and trees and as a provider of expert technical assistance and advice to help countries develop and implement effective national forest programmes.

FAO is both a global clearinghouse for information on forests and forest resources and a facilitator that helps building countries' local capacity to provide their own national forest data. In collaboration with member countries, FAO carries out periodic global assessments of forest resources, which are made available through reports, publications and the FAO's Web site. The Global Forest Resources Assessment provides comprehensive reporting on forests worldwide every five years. FRA 2020 is the most recent global assessment. The results, data and analyses are available online in different formats, including key findings, main report and country reports.

Every two years, FAO publishes the State of the World's Forests, a major report covering current and emerging issues facing the forestry sector.

Since 1947, FAO has published the FAO Yearbook of Forest Products, a compilation of statistical data on basic forest products from over 100 countries and territories of the world. It contains data on the volume of production; and the volume, value and direction of trade in forest products.

Unasylva, FAO's peer-reviewed journal on forestry, has been published in English, French and Spanish on a regular basis since 1947, the longest-running multilingual forestry journal in the world.

The FAO is an official sponsor of International Day of Forests, on 21 March each year, as proclaimed by the United Nations General Assembly on 28 November 2012.

Every six years since 1926, FAO and a host member state hold the World Forestry Congress. It is a forum for the sharing of knowledge and experience regarding the conservation, management and use of the world's forests, and covers such issues as international dialogue, socio-economic and institutional aspects, and forest policies.

The Forestry Department is also organized geographically in several groups covering the whole world's forest ecosystems. One of them is the Silva Mediterranean work-group, covering the pan-Mediterranean region.

==== Tree Cities of the World ====
At the World Forum on Urban Forests in October 2018, the FAO and the Arbor Day Foundation jointly launched the Tree Cities of the World programme. The aim of this programme is to celebrate and recognize cities and towns of all sizes throughout the world which have shown a commitment to maintaining their urban forests. From the end of 2019, any municipality which has responsibility for its trees was able to apply to join Tree Cities of the World. On 4 February 2020, 59 cities were announced as having achieved the designation of Tree City of the World. There were 27 in the United States, with the rest scattered across the world.

=== Fisheries ===
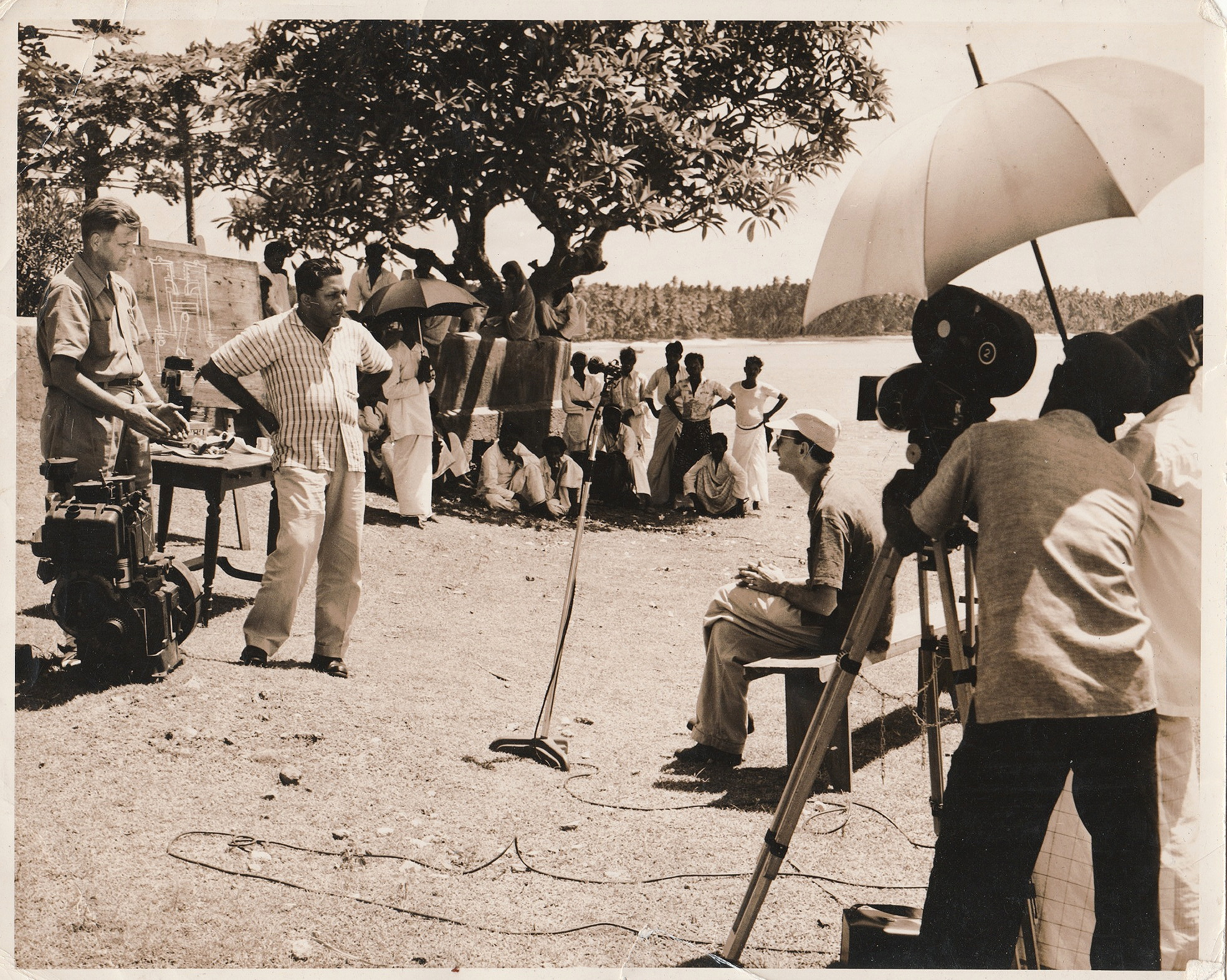
FAO fisheries expert, Ceylon, 1950s

The FAO Fisheries and Aquaculture Department is defined through its vision and mission statements:

- Vision: A world in which responsible and sustainable use of fisheries and aquaculture resources makes an appreciable contribution to human well-being, food security and poverty alleviation.
- Mission: To strengthen global governance and the managerial and technical capacities of members and to lead consensus-building towards improved conservation and utilization of aquatic resources.

The work of the Fisheries and Aquaculture Department centers on the "Sustainable management and use of fisheries and aquaculture resource", embracing normative as well as operational activities, whether implemented from headquarters or from the field.

The FAO Code of Conduct for Responsible Fisheries was adopted in 1995.

=== Statistics ===
ESSG is an acronym for the Global Statistics Service, the major "section" of the United Nations' Food and Agriculture Organization - Statistics Division. It is responsible for updating and disseminating the FAOSTAT report. This offers free and easy access to data for 245 countries and 35 regional areas from 1961 through the most recent year available. Enhanced features include browsing and analysis of data, an advanced interactive data download, and enhanced data exchange through web services.

The Land and Water Division maintains a database of global water statistics, Aquastat. The Fisheries and Aquaculture Division maintains a database of global Fisheries and Aquaculture statistics, FishStat.

== Membership ==
As of 1 May 2020, the Organization has 194 Member Nations, one Member Organization, and two Associate Members.

1. Afghanistan
2. Albania
3. Algeria
4. Andorra
5. Angola
6. Antigua and Barbuda
7. Argentina
8. Armenia
9. Australia
10. Austria
11. Azerbaijan
12. Bahamas, The
13. Bahrain
14. Bangladesh
15. Barbados
16. Belarus
17. Belgium
18. Belize
19. Benin
20. Bhutan
21. Bolivia
22. Bosnia and Herzegovina
23. Botswana
24. Brazil
25. Brunei
26. Bulgaria
27. Burkina Faso
28. Burundi
29. Cambodia
30. Cameroon
31. Canada
32. Cape Verde
33. Central African Republic
34. Chad
35. Chile
36. China (Note: The Republic of China was originally a member of FAO from 16 October 1945, despite its territory being reduced to Taiwan and some offshore islands following the Chinese Civil War in 1949. In 1951 the ROC withdrew from the FAO. In 1973, the People's Republic of China assumed its seat at the FAO. For more on its complex detail, see the political status of Taiwan.)
37. Colombia
38. Comoros
39. Congo, Democratic Republic of the
40. Congo, Republic of the
41. Cook Islands (Note: a part of the Realm of New Zealand)
42. Costa Rica
43. Côte d'Ivoire (Ivory Coast)
44. Croatia
45. Cuba
46. Cyprus
47. Czech Republic (Czechia)
48. Denmark (Note: a part of the Danish Realm)
49. Djibouti
50. Dominica
51. Dominican Republic
52. Ecuador
53. Egypt
54. El Salvador
55. Equatorial Guinea
56. Eritrea
57. Estonia
58. Eswatini (Swaziland)
59. Ethiopia
60. European Union (Note: member organization)
61. Faroe Islands (Note: associate member)
62. Fiji
63. Finland
64. France (French Republic)
65. Gabon
66. Gambia, The
67. Georgia
68. Germany
69. Ghana
70. Greece
71. Grenada
72. Guatemala
73. Guinea
74. Guinea-Bissau
75. Guyana
76. Haiti
77. Honduras
78. Hungary
79. Iceland
80. India
81. Indonesia
82. Iran
83. Iraq
84. Ireland
85. Israel
86. Italy
87. Jamaica
88. Japan
89. Jordan
90. Kazakhstan
91. Kenya
92. Kiribati
93. Korea, Democratic People's Republic of
94. Korea, Republic of
95. Kuwait
96. Kyrgyzstan
97. Laos
98. Latvia
99. Lebanon
100. Lesotho
101. Liberia
102. Libya
103. Lithuania
104. Luxembourg
105. Madagascar
106. Malawi
107. Malaysia
108. Maldives
109. Mali
110. Malta
111. Marshall Islands
112. Mauritania
113. Mauritius
114. Mexico
115. Micronesia, Federated States of
116. Moldova
117. Monaco
118. Mongolia
119. Montenegro
120. Morocco
121. Mozambique
122. Myanmar (Burma)
123. Namibia
124. Nauru
125. Nepal
126. Netherlands
127. New Zealand
128. Nicaragua
129. Niger
130. Nigeria
131. Niue
132. North Macedonia
133. Norway
134. Oman
135. Pakistan
136. Palau
137. Panama
138. Papua New Guinea
139. Paraguay
140. Peru
141. Philippines
142. Poland
143. Portugal
144. Qatar
145. Romania
146. Russian Federation
147. Rwanda
148. Saint Kitts and Nevis
149. Saint Lucia
150. Saint Vincent and the Grenadines
151. Samoa
152. San Marino
153. São Tomé and Príncipe
154. Saudi Arabia
155. Senegal
156. Serbia
157. Seychelles
158. Sierra Leone
159. Singapore
160. Slovakia
161. Slovenia
162. Solomon Islands
163. Somalia
164. South Africa
165. South Sudan
166. Spain
167. Sri Lanka
168. Sudan
169. Suriname
170. Sweden
171. Switzerland
172. Syria
173. Tajikistan
174. Tanzania
175. Thailand
176. Timor-Leste (East Timor)
177. Togo
178. Tokelau
179. Tonga
180. Trinidad and Tobago
181. Tunisia
182. Turkey
183. Turkmenistan
184. Tuvalu
185. Uganda
186. Ukraine
187. United Arab Emirates
188. United Kingdom
189. United States
190. Uruguay
191. Uzbekistan
192. Vanuatu
193. Venezuela
194. Vietnam
195. Yemen
196. Zambia
197. Zimbabwe

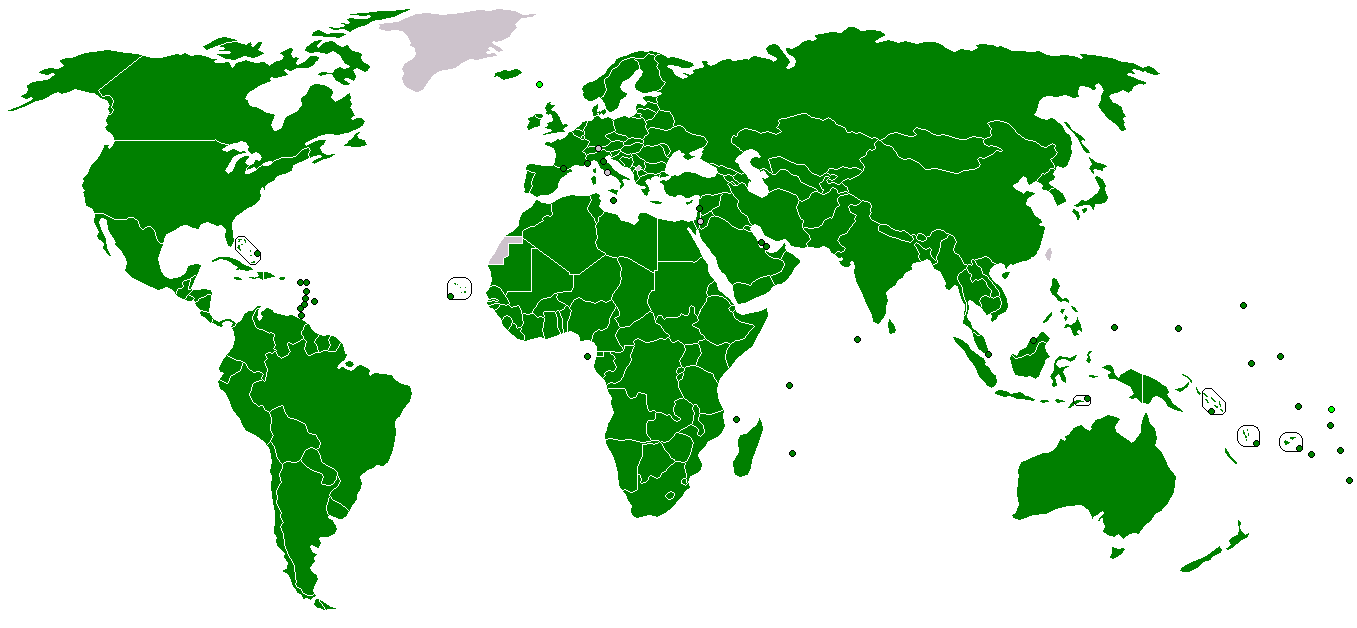
FAO member states FAO associates

Taiwan (at the time representing China), withdrew from the FAO in 1951. in 1971, the People's Republic of China was recognized as the representative of China by the FAO and the withdrawal from part of Taiwan was not taken into account.

The only UN member state that is a non-member of the FAO is Liechtenstein.

Both UN observer states are also non-members of the FAO: the Holy See (Vatican City) and Palestine.

Some countries may denote specific representatives to the FAO, for instance the United States Ambassador to the Food and Agriculture Organization of the United Nations, who has ambassador rank and is also a part of the United States Mission to the UN Agencies in Rome.

== Criticism ==
=== 1970s, 80s, 90s ===
There has been public criticism of FAO for at least 30 years. Dissatisfaction with the organization's performance was among the reasons for the creation of two new organizations after the World Food Conference in 1974, namely the World Food Council and the International Fund for Agricultural Development; by the early eighties there was intense rivalry among these organizations. At the same time, the World Food Programme, which started as an experimental three-year programme under FAO, was growing in size and independence, with the Directors of FAO and WFP struggling for power.

Early in 1989, the organization came under attack from Heritage Foundation, an American conservative think tank, which described the FAO as becoming "essentially irrelevant in combating hunger" due to a "bloated bureaucracy known for the mediocrity of its work and the inefficiency of its staff", which had become politicized. In September of the same year, the journal Society published a series of articles about FAO that included a contribution from the Heritage Foundation and a response by FAO staff member, Richard Lydiker, who was later described by the Danish Minister for Agriculture (who had herself resigned from the organization) as "FAO's chief spokesman for non-transparency".

In 1990, the U.S. State Department expressed the view that "The Food and Agriculture Organization has lagged behind other UN organizations in responding to US desires for improvements in program and budget processes to enhance value for money spent".

A year later, in 1991, The Ecologist magazine produced a special issue under the heading "The UN Food and Agriculture Organization: Promoting World Hunger". The magazine included articles that questioned FAO's policies and practices in forestry, fisheries, aquaculture, and pest control. The articles were written by experts such as Helena Norberg-Hodge, Vandana Shiva, Edward Goldsmith, Miguel A. Altieri and Barbara Dinham.

=== 2000s ===
The 2002 Food Summit organized by FAO was considered to have been ineffectual and unproductive by the official participants. Social movements, farmers, fisherfolk, pastoralists, indigenous peoples, environmentalists, women's organizations, trade unions and NGOs expressed their "collective disappointment in, and rejection of the official Declaration of the ... Summit".

In 2004, FAO produced a controversial report called "Agricultural Biotechnology: meeting the needs of the poor?", which claimed that "agricultural biotechnology has real potential as a new tool in the war on hunger". In response to the report, more than 650 organizations from around the world signed an open letter in which they said "FAO has broken its commitment to civil society and peasants' organisations". The letter complained that organizations representing the interests of farmers had not been consulted, that FAO was siding with the biotechnology industry and, consequently, that the report "raises serious questions about the independence and intellectual integrity of an important United Nations agency". Jacques Diouf, the Director General of FAO at that time, responded immediately, stating that decisions on biotechnology must "be taken at the international level by competent bodies" (in other words, not by non-governmental organizations). He acknowledged, however, that "biotechnology research is essentially driven by the world's top ten transnational corporations" and "the private sector protects its results with patents in order to earn from its investment and it concentrates on products that have no relevance to food in developing countries".

In May 2006, a British newspaper published the resignation letter of Louise Fresco, one of eight Assistant Directors-General of FAO. In her letter, Fresco stated that "the Organization has been unable to adapt to a new era", that its "contribution and reputation have declined steadily" and "its leadership has not proposed bold options to overcome this crisis".

The 32nd Session of FAO's Committee on World Food Security in 2006, attended by 120 countries, was widely criticized by non-governmental organizations, but largely ignored by the mainstream media. Oxfam called for an end to the talk-fests while Via Campesina issued a statement that criticised FAO's policy of Food Security.

On 18 October 2007, the final report of an Independent External Evaluation of FAO was published. More than 400 pages in length, the evaluation was the first of its kind in the history of the Organization. It had been commissioned by decision of the 33rd Session of the FAO Conference in November 2005. The report concluded that "The Organization is today in a financial and programme crisis" but "the problems affecting the Organization today can all be solved". Among the problems noted by the IEE were: "The Organization has been conservative and slow to adapt"; "FAO currently has a heavy and costly bureaucracy", and "The capacity of the Organization is declining and many of its core competencies are now imperilled". Among the solutions offered were: "A new Strategic Framework", "institutional culture change and reform of administrative and management systems". In conclusion the IEE stated that, "If FAO did not exist it would need to be invented".

The official response from FAO came on 29 October 2007. It indicated that management supported the principal conclusion in the report of the IEE on the need for "reform with growth" so as to have an FAO "fit for this century". Meanwhile, hundreds of FAO staff signed a petition in support of the IEE recommendations, calling for "a radical shift in management culture and spirit, depoliticization of appointments, restoration of trust between staff and management, [and] setting strategic priorities of the organization".

In May 2008, while talking about the ongoing world food crisis, President Abdoulaye Wade of Senegal expressed the opinion that FAO was "a waste of money" and that "we must scrap it". Wade said that FAO was itself largely to blame for the price rises, and that the organization's work was duplicated by other bodies that operated more efficiently, like the UN's International Fund for Agricultural Development. However, this criticism may have had more to do with personal animosity between the President and the Director-General, himself a Senegalese, particularly in light of the significant differences in the work carried out by the two organizations.

In June 2008, the FAO sponsored the High-Level Conference on World Food Security. The summit was notable for the lack of agreement over the issue of biofuels. The response to the summit among non-governmental organizations was mixed, with Oxfam stating that "the summit in Rome was an important first step in tackling the food crisis but greater action is now needed", while Maryam Rahmanian of Iran's Centre for Sustainable Development said "We are dismayed and disgusted to see the food crisis used to further the policies that have led us to the food crisis in the first place". As with previous food summits, civil society organizations held a parallel meeting and issued their own declaration to "reject the corporate industrial and energy-intensive model of production and consumption that is the basis of continuing crises."

In November 2008, a Special Conference of FAO member countries agreed a US$42.6 million (€38.6 million), three-year Immediate Plan of Action for "reform with growth", as recommended by the IEE. Under the plan US$21.8 million would be spent on overhauling the financial procedures, hierarchies and human resources management.

=== 2010s ===
From 2013, an English-language newspaper based in Rome, The Italian Insider, made several allegations of nepotism and corruption within FAO and reported on poor management-staff relations. In June 2018, FAO and four of its officials took the paper and its editor, John Philips, to court alleging defamation, using a law dating back to the fascist era in Italy. Reporters Without Borders condemned "the disproportionate nature of the defamation proceedings", for which the newspaper was liable for a fine of up to Euros 100,000 and the editor at least three years in prison. The case was adjourned until January 2019, when it was further adjourned until May 2019. The January hearing was considered by the British satirical magazine Private Eye to have been "one of the more surreal courtroom scenes in modern times", involving dispute as to the meaning of an English slang word used by the Insider.

In 2016/17 FAO was heavily criticized for recruiting Nadine Heredia Alarcón de Humala, wife of the former president of Peru, Ollanta Humala, to a senior position, at a time when she was being investigated by Peru following corruption allegations. Critics included Transparency International.

At the end of April 2017, FAO staff unions addressed the organization's Governing Council to complain about the practice of issuing short-term contracts that "exploit employees without providing job security, social security and paid leave". Other complaints included the increasing centralization of management processes, despite claims that FAO was being decentralized, and the failure to follow United Nations recommendations regarding increasing the retirement age. The staff representative also complained about the high percentage of unfilled positions, increasing the workload for others who were under pressure to deliver more with less. She also noted that contacts between Management and the staff bodies were becoming less and less frequent.

=== 2020s ===
An investigation by the German public broadcaster ARD shows that the Chinese leadership of the UN Food and Agriculture Organisation FAO has tailored it to Chinese interests since Qu Dongyu took office in 2019. According to the report, the acting director-general has instrumentalized the FAO in Beijing's interests: It is about deliveries of pesticides banned in Europe, the majority of which come from the Chinese agrochemical company Syngenta, UN projects in line with China's "Belt and Road Initiative" as well as questionable investment projects.

== FAO renewal ==
The FAO Conference in November 2007 unanimously welcomed the IEE report and established a Conference Committee for the Follow-up to the Independent External Evaluation of FAO (CoC-IEE) to be chaired by the Independent Chairperson of Council, and open to full participation by all Members. The CoC-IEE was charged to review the IEE report and its recommendations and develop an Immediate Plan of Action (IPA) for their implementation.

A comprehensive programme of organizational reform and culture change began in 2008 after the release of an Independent External Evaluation. Headquarters restructuring and delegation of decision making created a flatter more responsive structure and reduced costs. Modernizing and streamlining of administrative and operational processes took place. Improved internal teamwork and closer external partnerships coupled with upgrading of IT infrastructure and greater autonomy of FAO's decentralized offices now allows the Organization to respond quickly where needs are greatest. As FAO is primarily a knowledge based organization, investing in human resources is a top priority. Capacity building including a leadership programme, employee rotation and a new junior professional programme were established. Individual performance management, an ethics and ombudsman officer and an independent office of evaluation were designed to improve performance through learning and strengthened oversight.

In January 2012, the Director-General José Graziano da Silva acted upon the commitment made during his campaign to bring the FAO reform to a successful and anticipated completion. In addition, the new Director-General shifted the focus of the reform process to realization of its benefits and mainstreaming the reform into the work of the Organization.

In July 2020, the FAO Council approved a series of measures proposed by its Director-General Qu Dongyu to modernize the organization and make it more efficient and effective. An important element within the approved measures is the adoption "of a more flexible organizational structure, aimed at ensuring agility, optimal cross-sectoral collaboration and better responses to emerging needs and priorities".

== See also ==
- FAO Country Profiles
- Regional Animal Health Center for North Africa
- World Food Day
- World Summit on Food Security 2009
- World Programme for the Census of Agriculture
- World Vegetable Center
